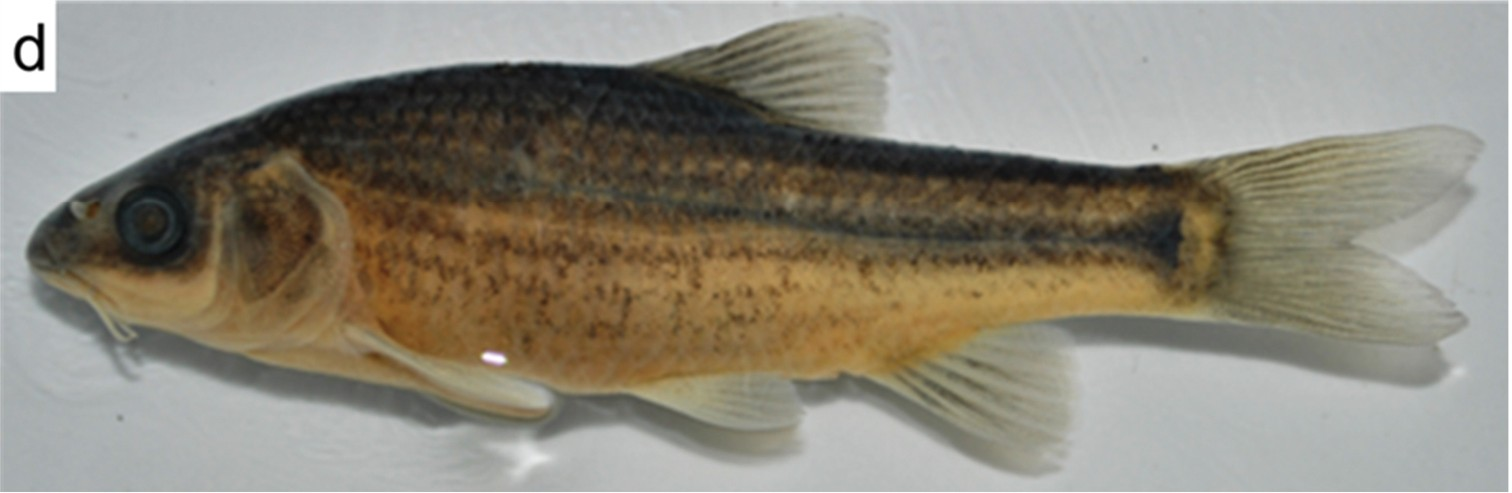

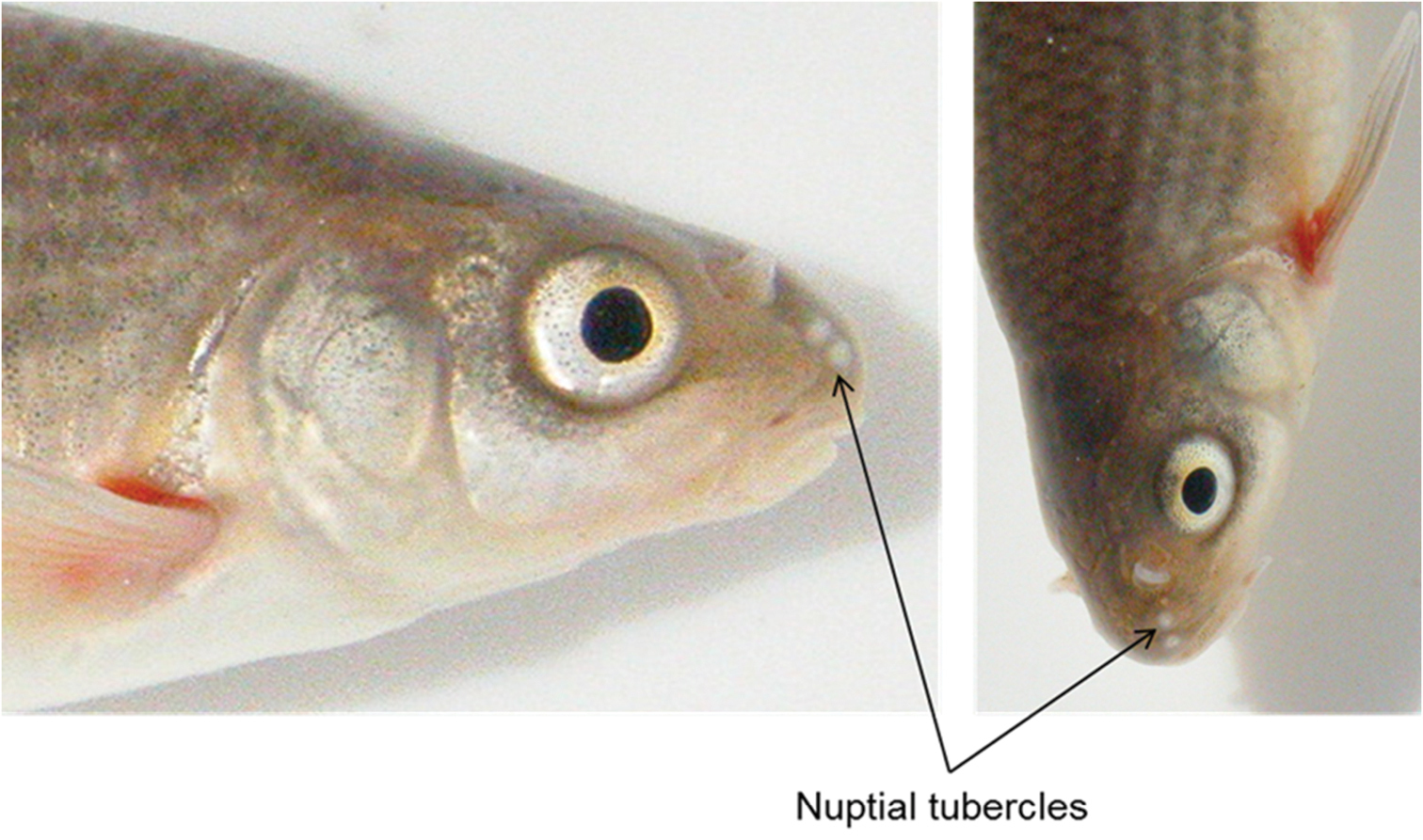

Conservation status
- Endangered (IUCN 3.1)

Scientific classification
- Kingdom: Animalia
- Phylum: Chordata
- Class: Actinopterygii
- Order: Cypriniformes
- Family: Cyprinidae
- Subfamily: Smiliogastrinae
- Genus: Pseudobarbus
- Species: P. verloreni

Binomial name
- Pseudobarbus verloreni Chakona, Swartz, & P. H. Skelton, 2014
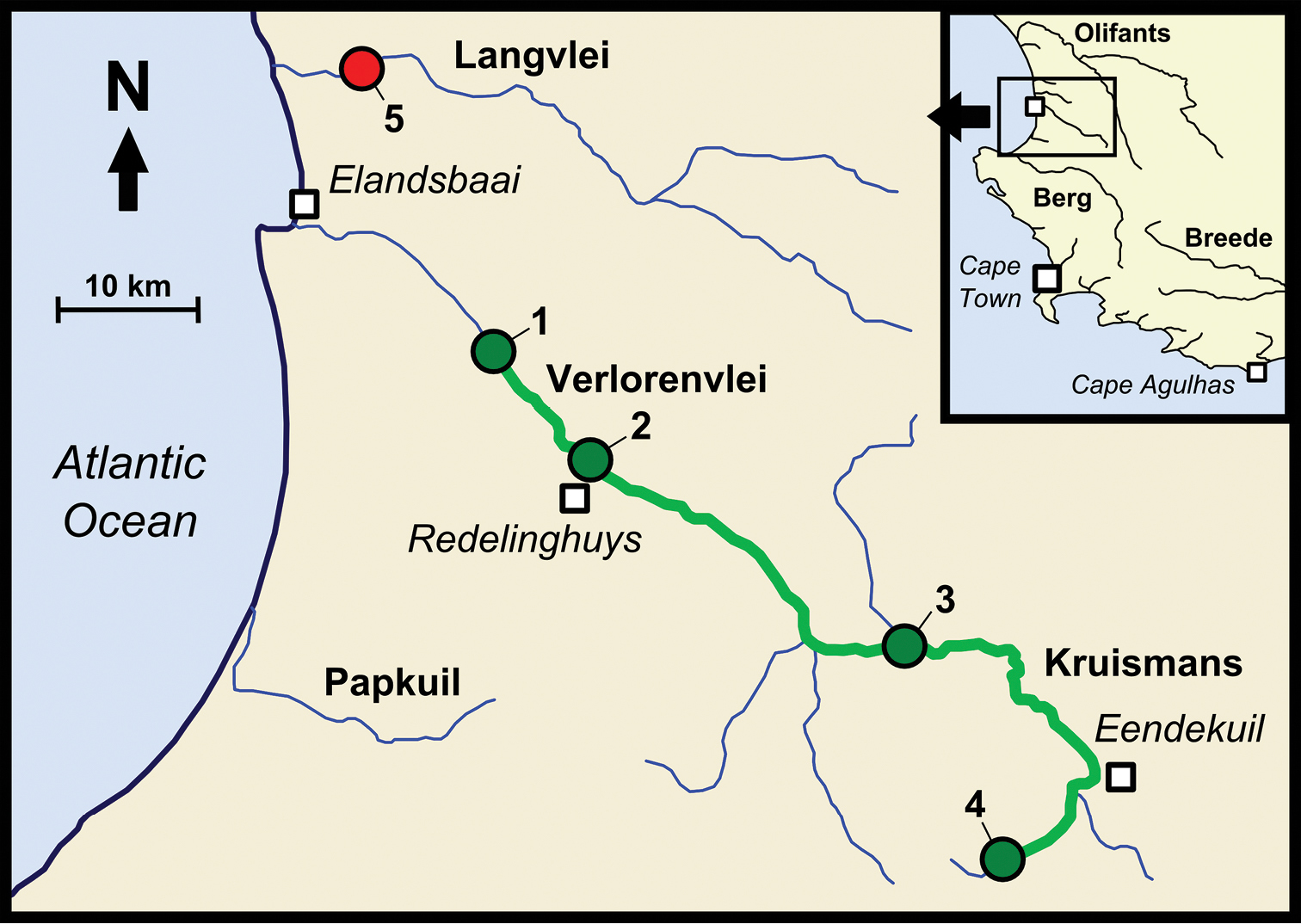
- Distribution in South Africa. Green = Current habitat Red = Former habitat

= Verlorenvlei redfin =

Species of fish

The Verlorenvlei redfin (Pseudobarbus verloreni) is a species of barb endemic to the Verlorenvlei River in South Africa.

== Etymology ==
The Verlorenvlei redfin takes its name from the Verlorenvlei River, its only remaining habitat.

== Description ==
The species can be distinguished from the related P. skeltoni, P. burchelli, and P. burgi by two pairs of barbels around the mouth. Upon dissection, it can also be distinguished by the length of its intestine, which is longer (relative to body length) than any other species of Pseudobarbus.

Individuals of Pseudobarbus verloreni grow 53.3–70.8 millimetres (2.10–2.79 in) long. The species has large eyes and a compressed snout. General colouration is golden, with a silver ventral surface. A lateral stripe runs from behind the head to a dark spot on the caudal peduncle. Fins are often red or orange around the base.

== Reproduction and development ==
The species is believed to spawn between October and December.

The lateral band fades as the individual matures. Furthermore, the reddish colouration around the fins is only found on adult specimens.

== Range and habitat ==
The Verlorenvlei redfin is endemic to lowland waterways in western South Africa, more specifically the Verlorenvlei River system. It is also believed to have previously occupied the Langvlei River.

The Verlorenvlei River is a slow flowing river with a bottom of sand, silt, or mud. During the rainy season, it becomes swift and turbulent, and during the dry season (late summer and autumn), it dries up into a series of separate pools.

== Discovery ==
The Berg River redfin was originally believed to be found in the Berg, Verlorenvlei, Langvlei, and Eerste rivers, before disappearing from the latter two. A 1988 study by Paul Skelton found that specimens from the Verlorenvlei River differed markedly from the Berg River population, having a longer intestine and a greater length between the snout and the dorsal fin. It was confirmed that the populations were genetically dissimilar in a 2000 paper published in the Journal of Heredity, which indicated that they had been isolated for 0.5–2.3 million years, setting the date of divergence during the Pleistocene. Two more papers, published in 2009 and 2013, reiterated the differentiation, and the Verlorenvlei population was assigned to a new species, Pseudobarbus verloreni, in 2014.

== Conservation status ==
P. verloreni is an endangered species, after it was exterminated from one of its two habitats, the Langvlei River system, between 1986 and 2001. It is believed to have disappeared due to the river being emptied during the dry season for agriculture.

Threats faced by the species include habitat loss as water is drained for irrigation, as well as predation by the introduced black bass and competition from native and invasive species such as the Banded tilapia, Mozambique tilapia, and common carp.
