= Nicolas-Louis de Lacaille =

French astronomer and geodesist (1713–1762)

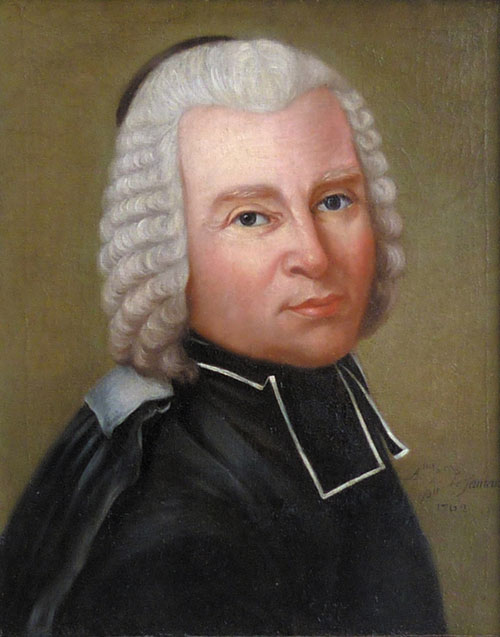
- Born: 15 March 1713; Rumigny, France
- Died: 21 March 1762 (aged 49); Paris, France
- Citizenship: French
- Scientific career
- Fields: Astronomy

Abbé Nicolas-Louis de Lacaille (French: [nikɔla lwi də lakaj]; 15 March 1713 – 21 March 1762), (Note: The traditional birth date of 15 March 1713 has been questioned due to many infants of the Catholic Church being baptised on the day of their birth in the 17th and 18th centuries. His baptism date is 15 December 1713; babies were normally baptised on the day that they were born.) formerly sometimes spelled de la Caille, was a French astronomer and geodesist who named 14 out of the 88 constellations. From 1750 to 1754, he studied the sky at the Cape of Good Hope in present-day South Africa. Lacaille observed over 10,000 stars using a refracting telescope.

== Biography ==
Born at Rumigny in the Ardennes in eastern France, he attended school in Mantes-sur-Seine (now Mantes-la-Jolie). Afterwards, he studied rhetoric and philosophy at the Collège de Lisieux and then theology at the Collège de Navarre. He was left destitute in 1731 by the death of his father, who had held a post in the household of the duchess of Vendôme. However, he was supported in his studies by the Duc de Bourbon, his father's former patron.

After he graduated, he did not accept ordination as a priest but took deacon's orders, becoming an Abbé. He concentrated thereafter on science, and, through the patronage of Jacques Cassini, obtained employment, first in surveying the coast from Nantes to Bayonne, then, in 1739, in remeasuring the French meridian arc, for which he is honoured with a pyramid at Juvisy-sur-Orge. The success of this difficult operation, which took two years and corrected the anomalous result published by Jacques Cassini in 1718, was mainly due to Lacaille's industry and skill. He was rewarded by admission to the Royal Academy of Sciences and an appointment as professor of mathematics in the Mazarin college of the University of Paris, where he constructed a small observatory fitted for his own use. He was the author of a number of influential textbooks and a firm advocate of Newtonian gravitational theory. His students included Antoine Lavoisier and Jean Sylvain Bailly, both of whom were later guillotined during the French Revolution.

== Voyage to the Cape of Good Hope ==
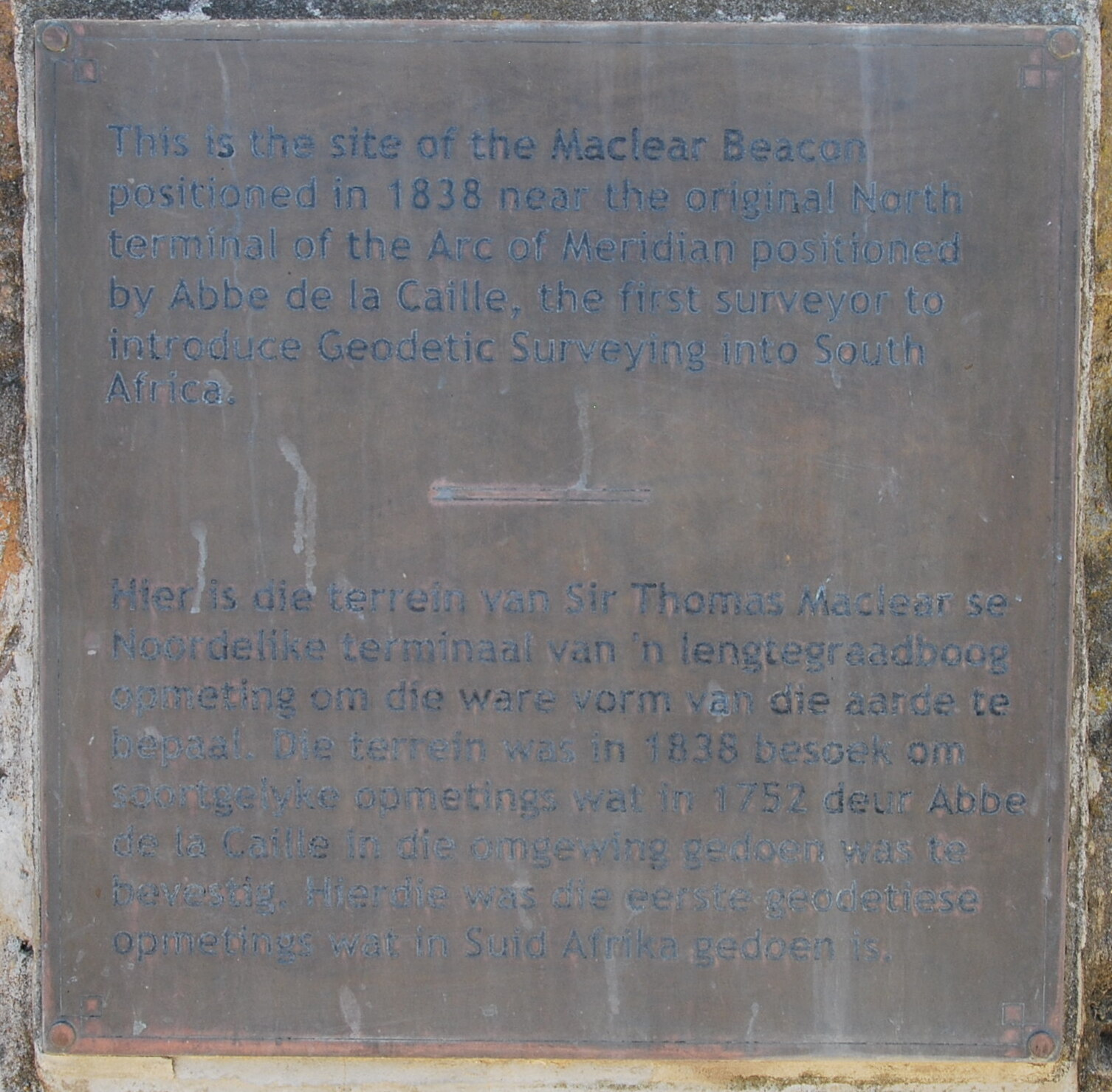
A memorial to the Abbé de Lacaille and Thomas Maclear, at Aurora in the Western Cape of South Africa. The English portion of the inscription reads: "This is the site of the Maclear Beacon positioned in 1838 near the original North Terminal of the Arc of Meridian positioned by Abbé de Lacaille, the first surveyor to introduce Geodetic Surveying into South Africa." Open the image to see the Afrikaans portion.

His desire to determine the distances of the planets trigonometrically, using the longest possible baseline, led him to propose, in 1750, an expedition to the Cape of Good Hope. This was officially sanctioned by Roland-Michel Barrin de La Galissonière. There, he constructed an observatory on the shore of Table Bay with the support of the Dutch Governor Ryk Tulbagh. The primary result of his two-year stay was the observations of nearly 10,000 southern stars, the production of which required observing every night for over a year. In the course of his survey he took note of 42 nebulous objects. He also achieved his aim of determining the lunar and solar parallaxes (Mars serving as an intermediary). This work required near-simultaneous observations from Europe which were carried out by Jérôme Lalande.

His southern catalogue, called Coelum Australe Stelliferum, was published posthumously in 1763. He found it necessary to introduce 14 new constellations which have since become standard. One of these was Mons Mensae, the only constellation named after a terrestrial feature (the Table Mountain). An 1890 study of this catalogue by B. A. Gould found a considerable number of errors.

While at the Cape, Lacaille performed an arc measurement to determine the radius of the Earth in the southern hemisphere. He set out a baseline in the Swartland plain north of present-day Darling. Using triangulation he then measured a 137 km arc of meridian between Cape Town and present-day Aurora, determining the astronomical latitudes of the end points by means of astronomical-geodetic observations. There is a memorial to his work at a location near Aurora, pictured here. His result suggested that the Earth was lengthened (prolate) instead of flattened (oblate) towards the south pole. George Everest, of the Indian Survey, while recuperating from an illness at the Cape nearly seventy years later, suggested that Lacaille's latitude observations had been affected by the deflection of the vertical, caused by gravitational attraction of Table Mountain at the southern end and by the Piketberg Mountain at the northern. In 1838, Thomas Maclear, who was Astronomer Royal at the Cape, repeated the measurements over a longer baseline (Maclear's arc measurement) and ultimately confirmed Everest's conjecture. Maclear's Beacon was erected on the Table Mountain in Cape Town to help with the verification.

== Computing ==
During his voyage to the southern hemisphere as a passenger on the vessel Le Glorieux, captained by the noted hydrographer Jean-Baptiste d'Après de Mannevillette, Lacaille became conscious of the difficulties in determining positions at sea. On his return to Paris he prepared the first set of tables of the Moon's position that was accurate enough to use for determining time and longitude by the method of 'Lunars' (Lunar distances) using the orbital theory of Clairaut.

Lacaille worked hard at astronomical calculations; apart from constructing astronomical ephemerides and mathematical tables, he calculated a table of eclipses for 1,800 years. Lalande said of him that, during his life, he had made more observations and calculations than all the astronomers of his time put together.

== Later life ==
On his return to Paris in 1754, following a diversion to Mauritius, Lacaille was distressed to find himself an object of public attention. He resumed his work at the Mazarin College.

In 1757 he published his Astronomiae Fundamenta Novissimus, containing a list of about 400 bright stars with positions corrected for aberration and nutation. He carried out calculations on comet orbits and was responsible for giving Halley's Comet its name. His last public lecture, given on 14 September 1761 at the Royal Academy of Sciences, summarised the improvements to astronomy that had occurred during his lifetime. His death, probably caused in part by over-work, occurred in 1762. He was buried in the vaults of the Mazarin College, now the Institut de France in Paris.

== Honours ==
In 1754, he was elected a foreign member of the Royal Swedish Academy of Sciences. He was also an honorary member of the academies of Saint Petersburg and Berlin, the Royal Society of London and the Royal Society of Göttingen, and the Institute of Bologna.

Lacaille has the honor of naming 14 different constellations:

- Antlia
- Caelum
- Circinus
- Fornax
- Horologium
- Mensa
- Microscopium
- Norma
- Octans
- Pictor
- Pyxis
- Reticulum
- Sculptor
- Telescopium

The crater "La Caille" on the Moon is named after him. Asteroid 9135 Lacaille (AKA 7609 P-L and 1994 EK6), discovered on 17 October 1960 by Cornelis Johannes van Houten, Ingrid van Houten-Groeneveld and Tom Gehrels at Palomar Observatory, was also named after him.

In honor of his contribution to the study of the southern hemisphere sky, a 60-cm telescope at Réunion Island will be named the Lacaille Telescope.

== Main works ==
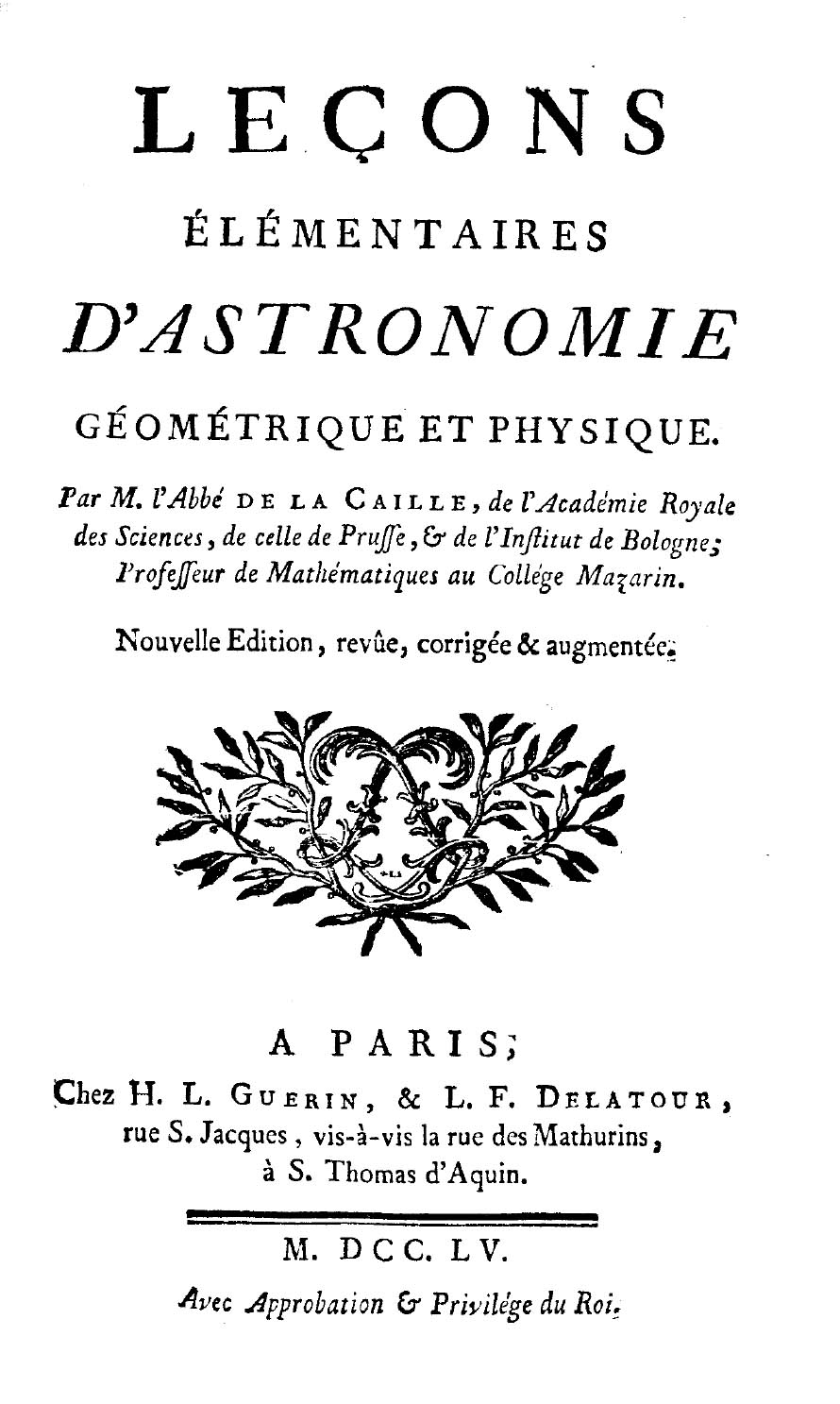
Leçons elementaires d'astronomie, géométrique et physique, 1755 edition

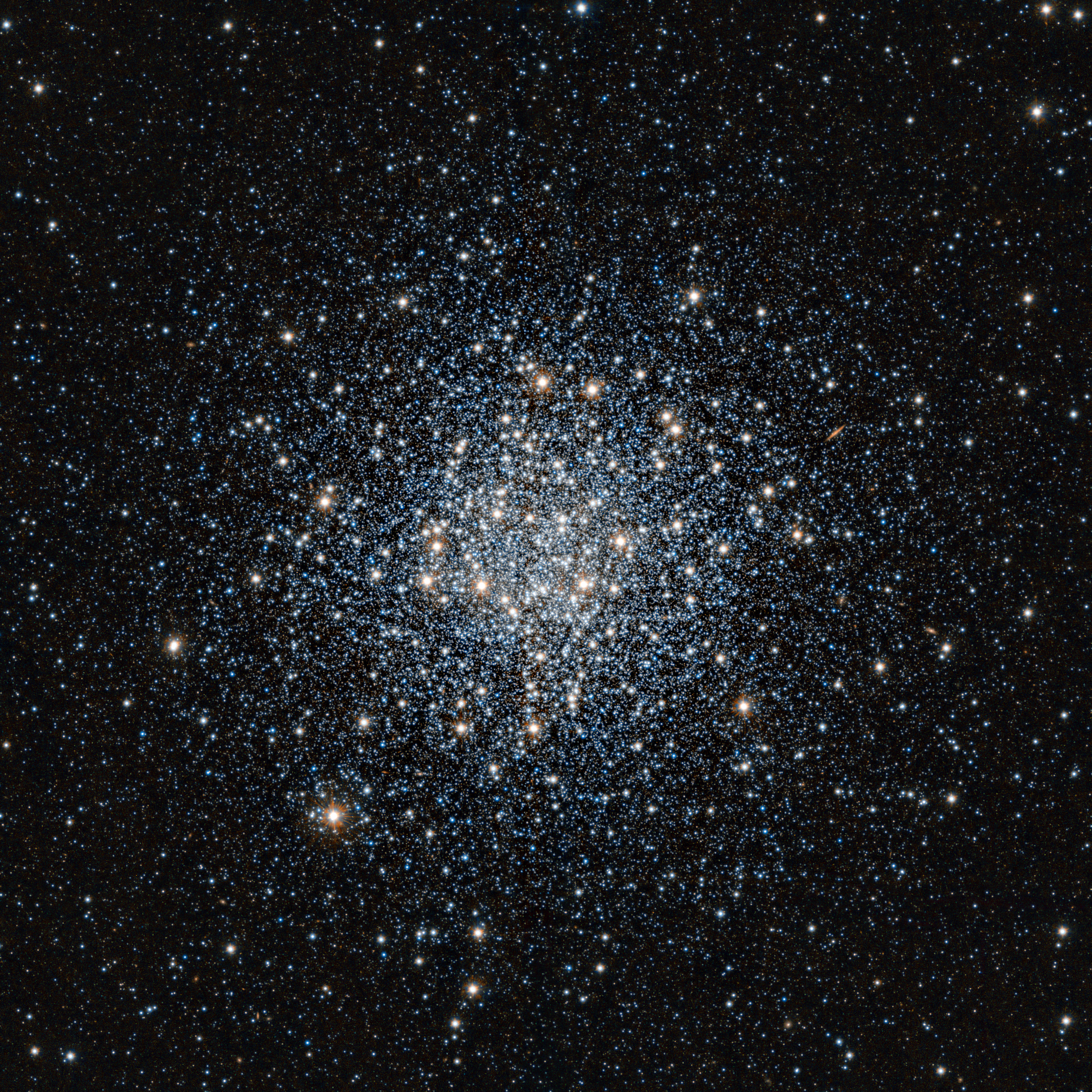
Messier 55 is a globular cluster discovered on 16 June 1752.

- Leçons élémentaires de Mathématiques (1741), frequently reprinted.
- ditto de Mécanique (1743), &c.
- ditto d'Astronomie (1746); 4th edition augmented by Lalande (1779).
- Leçons élémentaires d'optique (in French). Paris: Hippolyte Louis Guérin & Louis François Delatour. 1764. 2nd edition.
- Calculations by him of eclipses for eighteen hundred years were inserted in L'Art de vérifier les dates by Benedictine historian Charles Clémencet (1750).
- He communicated to the academy in 1755 a classed catalogue of forty two southern nebulae, and gave in t. ii. of his Ephémérides (1755) practical rules for the employment of the lunar method of longitudes, proposing in his additions to Pierre Bouguer's Traité de Navigation (1760) the model of a nautical almanac.
- Tabulae Solares (1758).
- Journal historique du Voyage fait au Cap de Bonne-Espérance; Précédé d'un Discours sur la Vie de l'Auteur, suivi des remarques & de réflexions sur les Coutumes des Hottentots & des Habitants du Cap (Paris: Guillyn, 1763).

=== Star catalogues ===
- "Remarques sur le Catalogue suivant des principales Étoiles du Ciel", Éphémérides des mouvemens célestes, pour dix années, depuis 1755 jusqu'en 1765, et pour le meridien de la ville de Paris (1755), pp. xlix-lxiii.
- "Table des Ascensions Droites et des Declinaisons Apparentes des Étoiles australes renfermées dans le tropique du Capricorne; observées au cap de Bonne-espérance, dans l'intervalle du 6 Août 1751, au 18 Juillet 1752", in: Histoire de l'Académie Royale des Sciences [pour] l'Année 1752, avec les Mémoires de Mathématique & de Physique, pour la même Année (Paris: L'Imprimerie Royale, 1756), Mémoires, pp. 539–592. (describing fourteen new constellations)
- "Stellarum ascensiones rectae verae & declinationes verae ad Epocham anni ineuntis 1750", Astronomiae fundamenta novissimis solis et stellarum observationibus stabilita, Lutetiae in Collegio mazarineo et in Africa ad Caput Bonae-Spei (1757), pp. 233–237. (containing a standard catalogue of 398 stars)
- "Stellarum longitudines & latitudines verae ad annum ineuntum 1750, Earum praecipue quae Zodiacales sunt", Astronomiae fundamenta (1757), pp. 238–239.
- "Sur les Étoiles nébuleuses du Ciel austral", in: Histoire de l'Académie Royale des Sciences [pour] l'Année M.DCCLV., avec les Mémoires de Mathématique & de Physique, pour la même Année (Paris: L'Imprimerie Royale, 1761), Mémoires, pp. 194–199.
- "Stellarum Australium Catalogus", in: Cœelum australe stelliferum, seu, Observationes ad Construendum Stellarum Australium Catalogum Institutae, in Africa ad Caput Bonae-Spei (Paris: Guerin & Delatour, 1763), pp. 139–158. (edited by J. D. Maraldi)
- "Catalogue suivant des principales Étoiles du Ciel, pour le commencement de l'Année 1750", Éphémérides des mouvemens célestes, pour dix annees, depuis 1765 jusqu'en 1775, et pour le meridien de la ville de Paris (1763), pp. lvii-lxiv.
- "Observations sur 515 étoiles du Zodiaque", Éphémérides des mouvemens célestes, pour dix annees, depuis 1765 jusqu'en 1775, (1763) pp. lxv-lxxvii.
- A catalogue of 9766 stars in the southern hemisphere,for the beginning of the year 1750: from the observations of the Abbé de Lacaille, made at the cap of Good Hope in the years 1751 and 1752; with a preface by Sir J. F. W. Herschel (1847), giving zone observations of about 10,000 stars, re-edited by F. Baily.

=== Star maps ===
- "Planisphere contenant les Constellations Celestes comprises entre le Pole Austral et le Tropique du Capricorne", in: Histoire de l'Académie Royale des Sciences [pour] l'Année 1752, avec les Mémoires de Mathématique & de Physique, pour la même Année (Paris: L'Imprimerie Royale, 1756), Mémoires,p. 592, plate 20.
- "Coelum Australe", Coelum australe stelliferum (1763). (Latin)
- "Planisphere des Etoiles les Australes dressé par M. i'Abbé de la Caille", Atlas Celeste de Flamsteed (1776), 2nd ed., plate 29. (French)
- "Planisphere des Etoiles les Australes dressé par M. i'Abbé de la Caille", Recueil de Planches de l'Encyclopédie par ordre de matieres (1789), vol. 7, plate 3. (French)
- "Planisphere des Etoiles les Australes dressé par M. i'Abbé de la Caille", Atlas Celeste de Flamsteed (1795), 3rd ed., plate 29. (French)
