= Disa physodes =

Scientific classification
- Kingdom: Plantae
- Clade: Embryophytes
- Clade: Tracheophytes
- Clade: Spermatophytes
- Clade: Angiosperms
- Clade: Monocots
- Order: Asparagales
- Family: Orchidaceae
- Subfamily: Orchidoideae
- Genus: Disa
- Species: D. physodes

Binomial name
- Disa physodes Sw.

Synonyms
- Monadenia physodes (Sw.) Rchb.f.

Species of flowering plant in the orchid family

Disa physodes (Brown Disa) is a perennial plant and geophyte belonging to the genus Disa and is part of the fynbos and renosterveld. The plant is endemic to the Western Cape and has always been found from Piketberg to the Cape Peninsula, but is currently restricted to the area between Wellington and Ceres. The species has lost 90% of its habitat to crop cultivation and suburban development. The total population is less than 100 plants. One of the threats is the absence of fires, as the plant requires periodic fires to flower.
