= Goedverwacht =

- Village
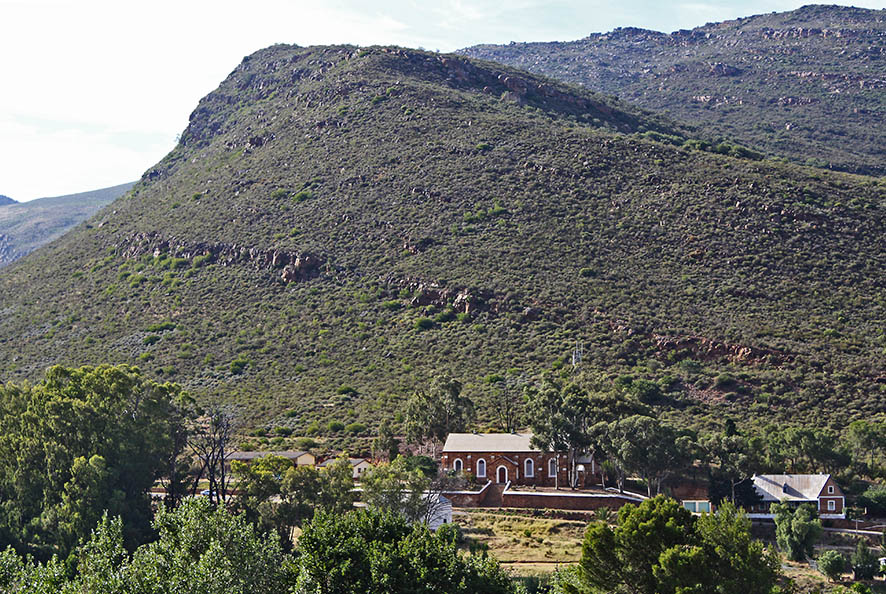
- Goedverwacht

- Location within Western Cape Location within South Africa
- Coordinates: 32°51′53″S 18°41′46″E
- Country: South Africa
- Province: Western Cape
- District: West Coast
- Municipality: Bergrivier
- First settled: 1810
- Established: 1889

Area
  - Total: 2.98 km^{2} (1.15 sq mi)

Population (2011)
  - Total: 1,979
  - Density: 664/km^{2} (1,720/sq mi)

Racial makeup (2011)
  - Black African: 3.5%
  - Coloured: 94.4%
  - Indian/Asian: 0.3%
  - White: 1.7%
  - Other: 0.1%

First languages (2011)
  - Afrikaans: 96.4%
  - Sign language: 1.5%
  - Other: 2.1%
- Time zone: UTC+2 (SAST)
- Postal code (street): 7323
- PO box: 7323
- Website: www.goedverwacht.com

Goedverwacht is a settlement in Bergrivier Local Municipality, West Coast District Municipality in the Western Cape province of South Africa, located off the R399 road near Piketberg.

The village originates from a cattle farm established in 1810, which was then bought by Moravian missionaries in 1889.

An annual festival is hosted by Goedverwacht Development Forum called the Snoek en Patat Fees. Thousands of festival goers flock to Goedverwacht during the first week of the June school holidays in the Western Cape Province.
