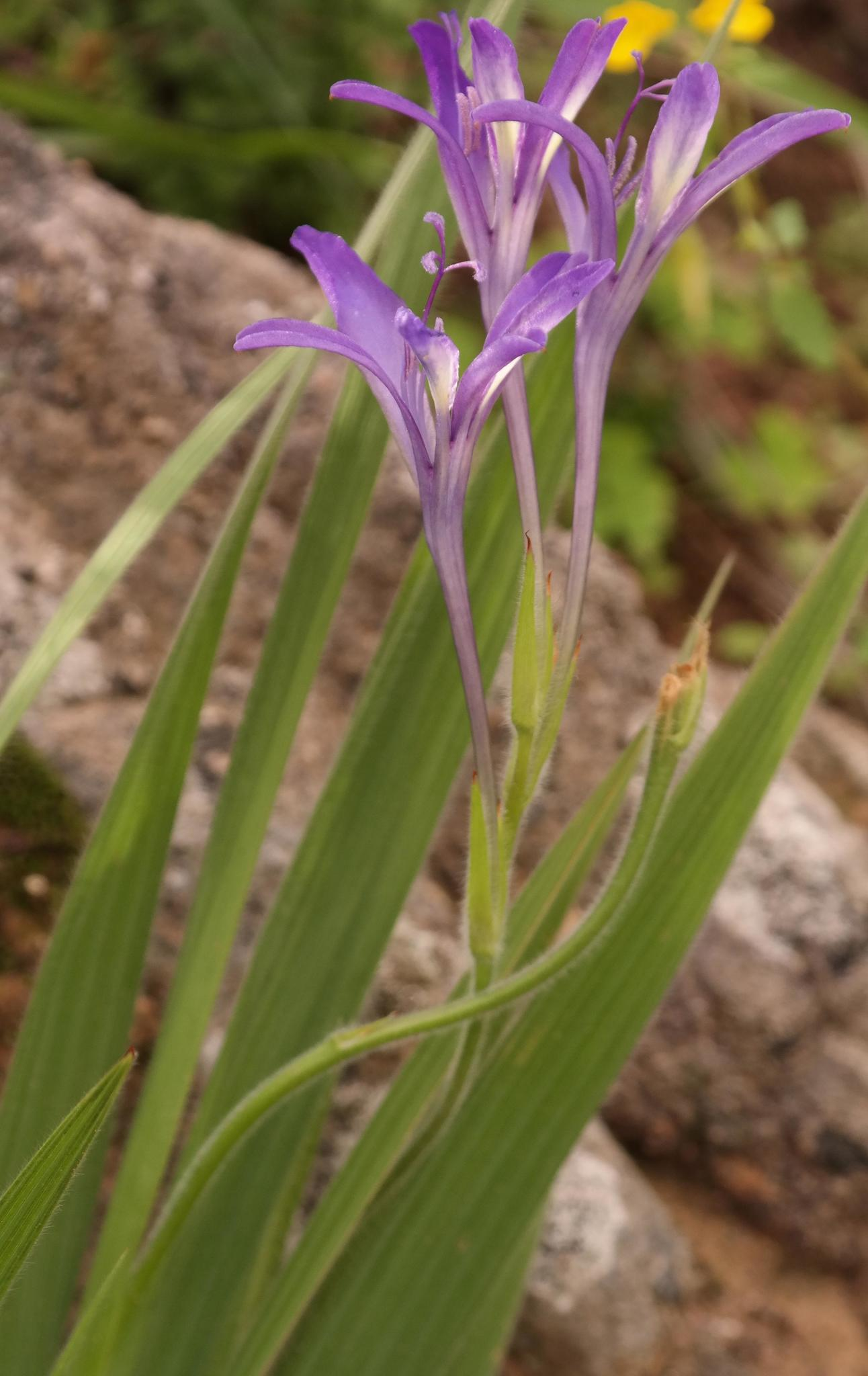

Scientific classification
- Kingdom: Plantae
- Clade: Tracheophytes
- Clade: Angiosperms
- Clade: Monocots
- Order: Asparagales
- Family: Iridaceae
- Genus: Babiana
- Species: B. tubaeformis

Binomial name
- Babiana tubaeformis Goldblatt & J.C.Manning

= Babiana tubaeformis =

Species of flowering plant

Babiana tubaeformis is a species of geophytic, perennial flowering plant in the family Iridaceae. It is part of the fynbos ecoregion. The species is endemic to the Western Cape and occurs on the Piketberg. It has a range of 16 km^{2} and there are two subpopulations. The plant has lost some of its habitat to crop cultivation and is further threatened by excessive fires, invasive plants and overgrazing.
