= Thomas Maclear =

South African astronomer (1794–1879)

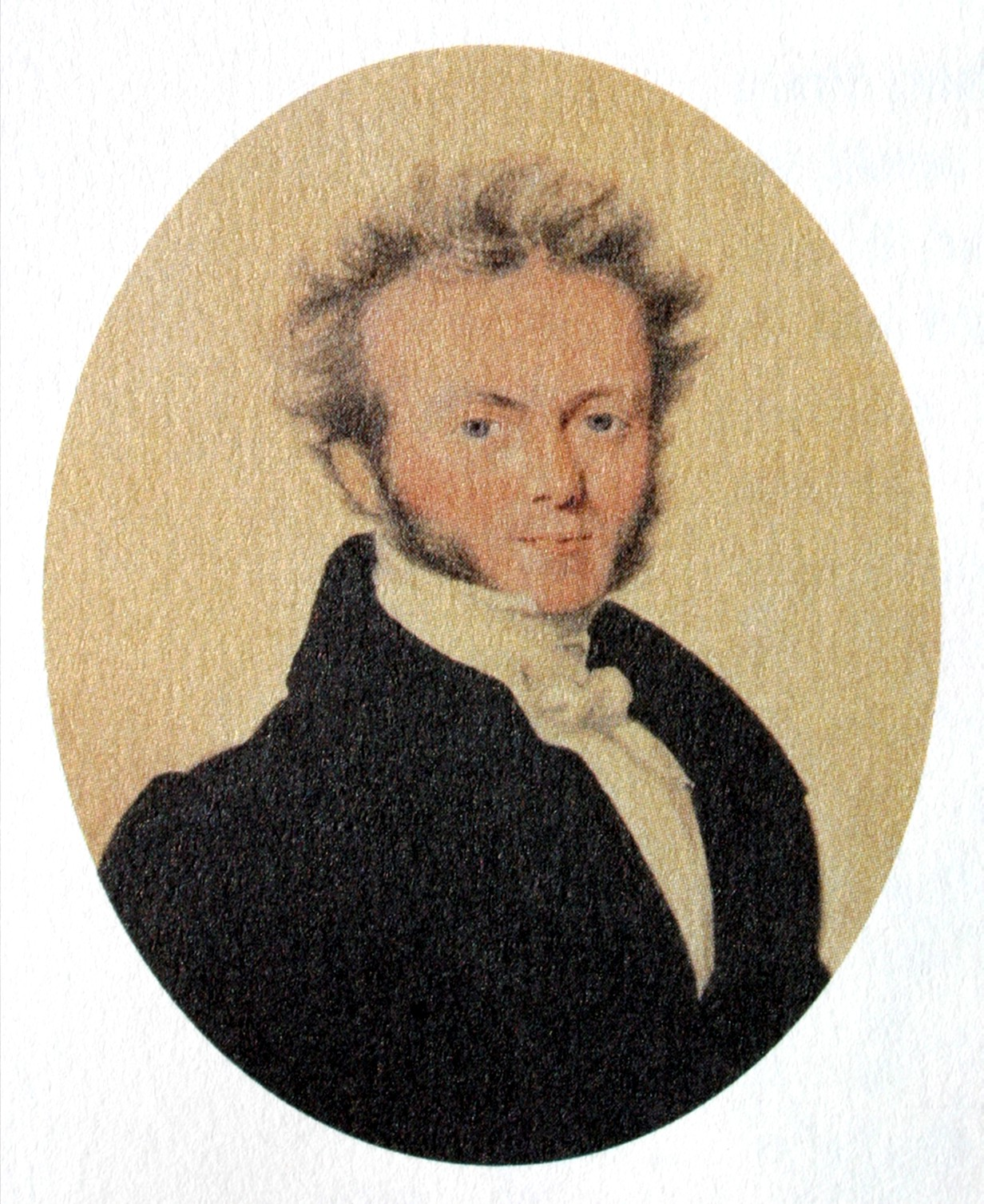
- 1833 portrait of Maclear
- Born: 17 March 1794; Newtownstewart, County Tyrone, Ireland
- Died: 14 July 1879 (aged 85); Cape Town, Cape Colony
- Occupations: Astronomer, surgeon
- Awards: Lalande Prize (1867); Royal Medal (1869)

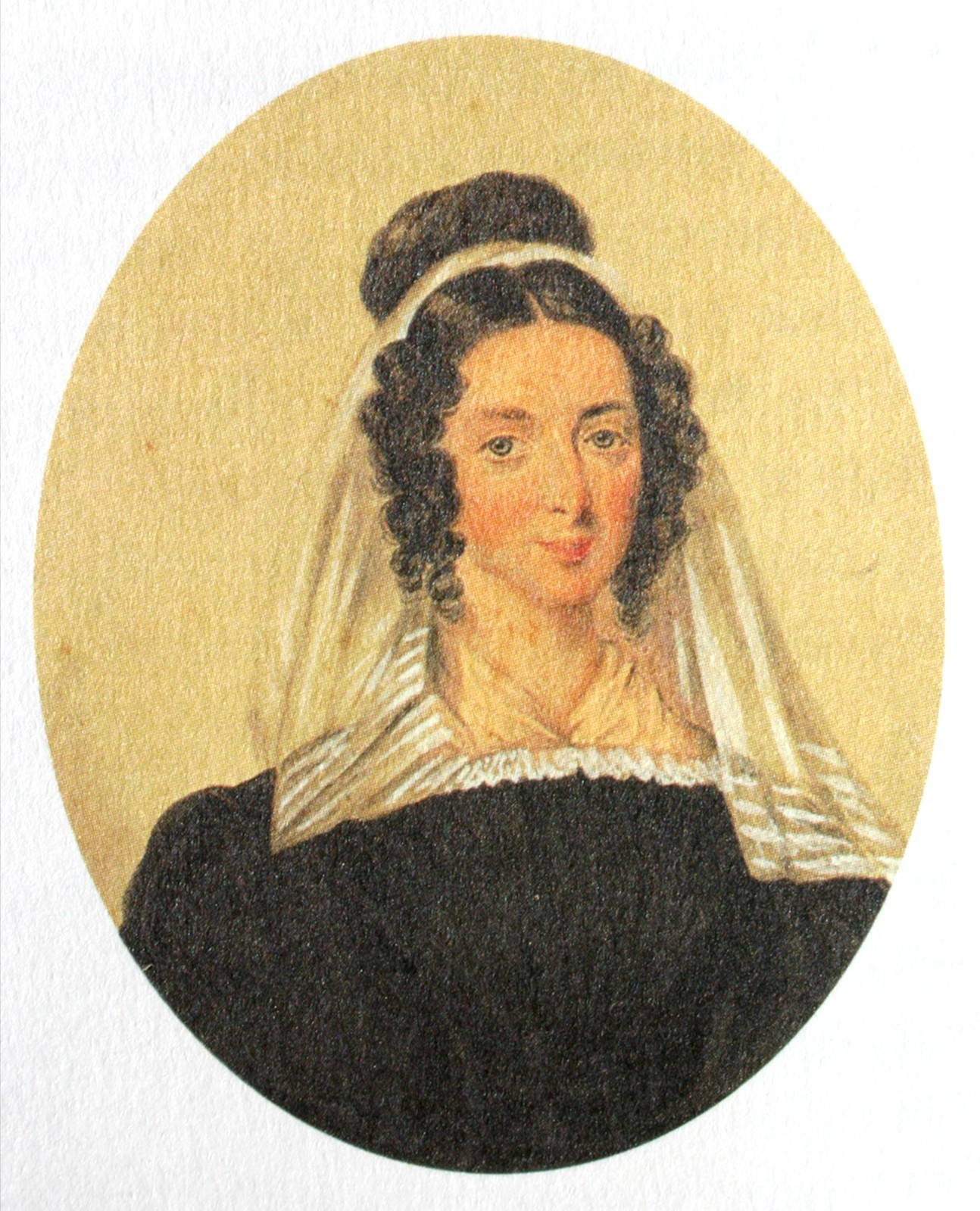
Mary Maclear

Thomas Maclear (17 March 1794 – 14 July 1879) was an Irish-born Cape Colony astronomer who became Her Majesty's astronomer at the Cape of Good Hope.

== Early life ==
Born on 17 March 1794, in Newtownstewart, the eldest son of Rev. James Maclear and Mary Magrath. In 1808, he was sent to England to be educated in the medical profession. After passing his examinations, in 1815 he was accepted into the Royal College of Surgeons of England. He then worked as house-surgeon in the Bedford Infirmary.

In 1823, he went into partnership with his uncle at Biggleswade, Bedfordshire. In 1825, he was married to Mary Pearse, the daughter of Theed Pearse, Clerk of the Peace for the county of Bedford.

== Career ==
Maclear had a keen interest in amateur astronomy, and would begin a long association with the Royal Astronomical Society, to which he would be named a Fellow. In 1833, when the post became vacant, he was named as Her Majesty's Astronomer at the Cape of Good Hope, and arrived there aboard the Tam O'Shanter with his wife and five daughters, to take up his new duties in 1834. He worked with John Herschel until 1838, performing a survey of the southern sky, and continued to perform important astronomical observations over several more decades. The Maclears and Herschels formed a close friendship, the wives drawn together by the unusual occupations of their husbands and the raising of their large families. Mary Maclear, like Margaret Herschel, was a noted beauty and intelligent, though suffering from extreme deafness.

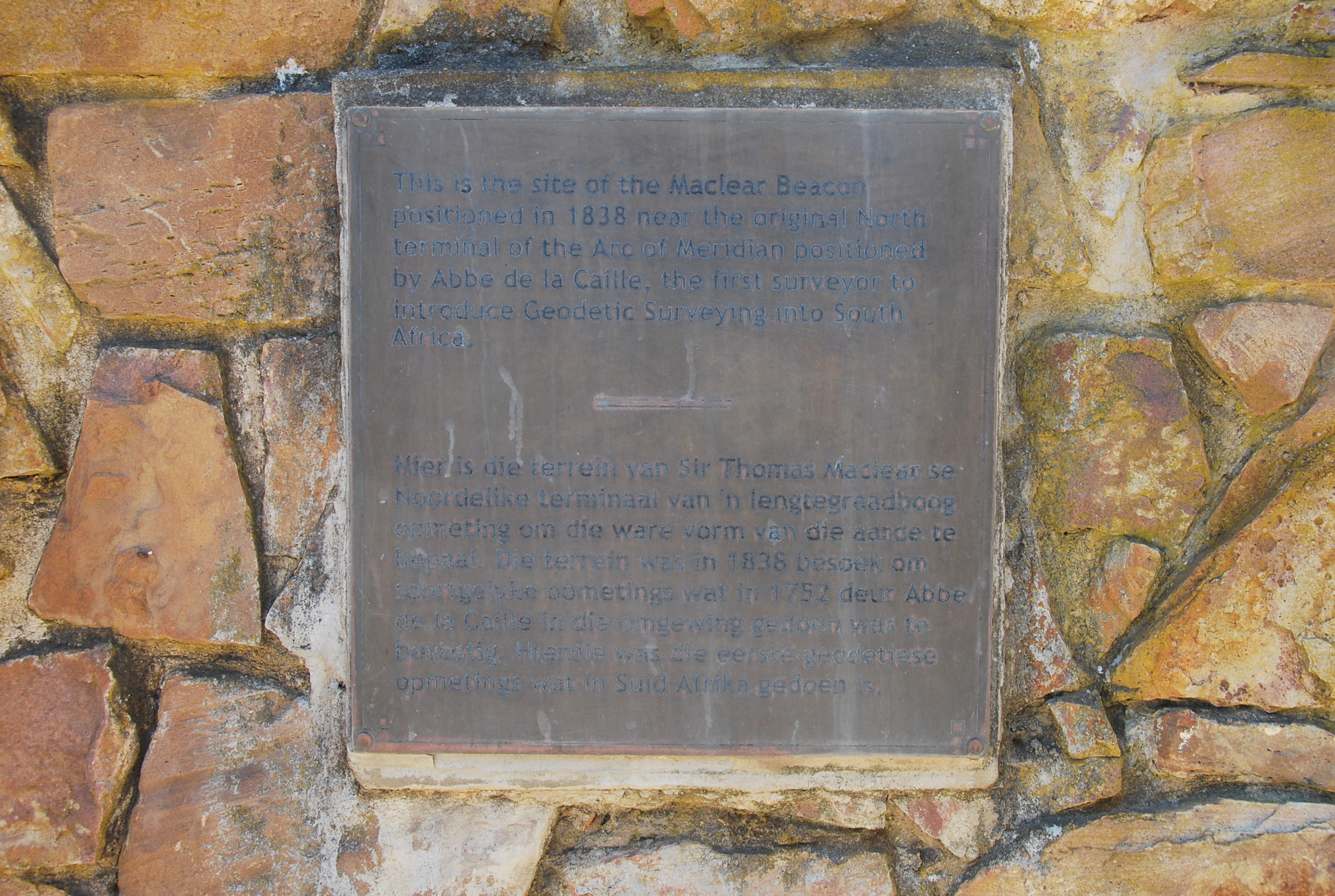
A memorial to Nicolas-Louis de Lacaille and Thomas Maclear, at Aurora, Western Cape, South Africa. The English portion of the inscription reads: "This is the site of the Maclear Beacon positioned in 1838 near the original North Terminal of the Arc of Meridian positioned by Abbé de la Caille, the first surveyor to introduce Geodetic Surveying into South Africa."

Between 1841 and 1848, Maclear would be occupied in performing a geodetic survey for the purpose of recalculating the figure of the Earth (its dimensions and shape) via an arc measurement. He caused a beacon to be erected on top of Table Mountain which was used as a triangulation station for the checking of de Lacaille's arc measurement.

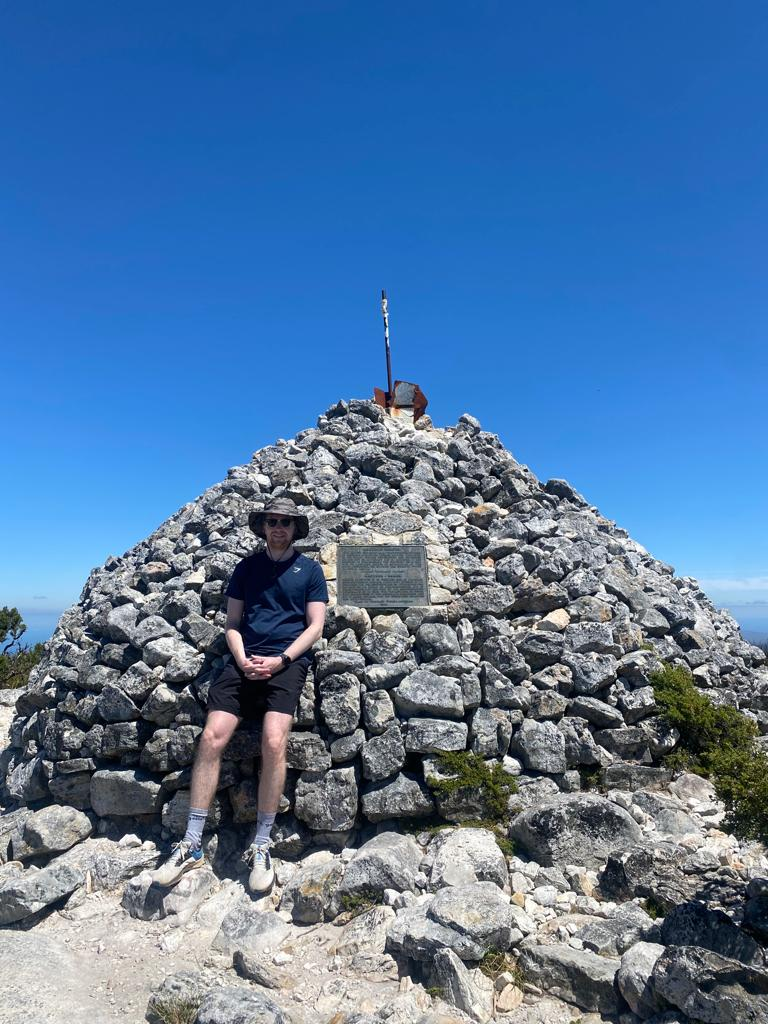
Maclear's Beacon, Table Mountain, Cape Town, 2023

He became close friends with David Livingstone, and they shared a common interest in the exploration of Africa. He performed many other useful scientific activities, including collecting meteorological, magnetic and tide data.

== Later life and death ==
In 1861, his wife died. In 1863, he was granted a pension, but did not retire from the observatory until 1870. He lived thereafter at Grey Villa, Mowbray. By 1876, he had lost his sight, and died on 14 July 1878, aged 85, in Cape Town. He is buried next to his wife in the grounds of the Royal Observatory, Cape of Good Hope.

== Awards and honors ==
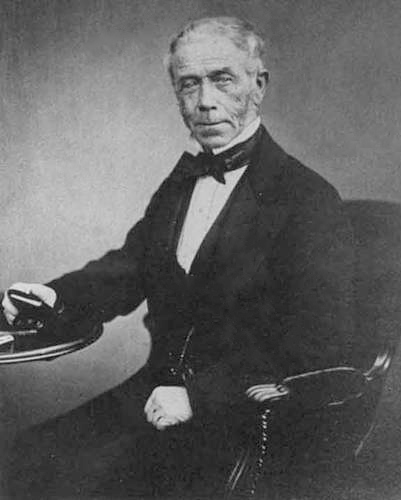
Sir Thomas, on the receipt of his knighthood, 1860

- Knighted in 1860 for his achievements as an astronomer.
- Lalande Prize (1866)
- Royal Medal of the Royal Society (1869), for his measurement of an arc of the meridian in the 1840s.
- The crater Maclear on the Moon is named after him; as is Maclear's Beacon on Table Mountain; the South African town, Maclear, Eastern Cape; and Cape Maclear in Malawi, so named by his friend David Livingstone.

== See also ==
- John Maclear, his son, was an admiral in the Royal Navy, and commander of the 1873–1876 HMS Challenger expedition
- Charles Piazzi Smyth
- Edward James Stone
- His grandson, Basil Maclear, was an Irish rugby international, who was killed in action during World War I
