= Dutch Reformed Church, Redelinghuys =

Church in Redelinghuys, South Africa

Dutch Reformed Church
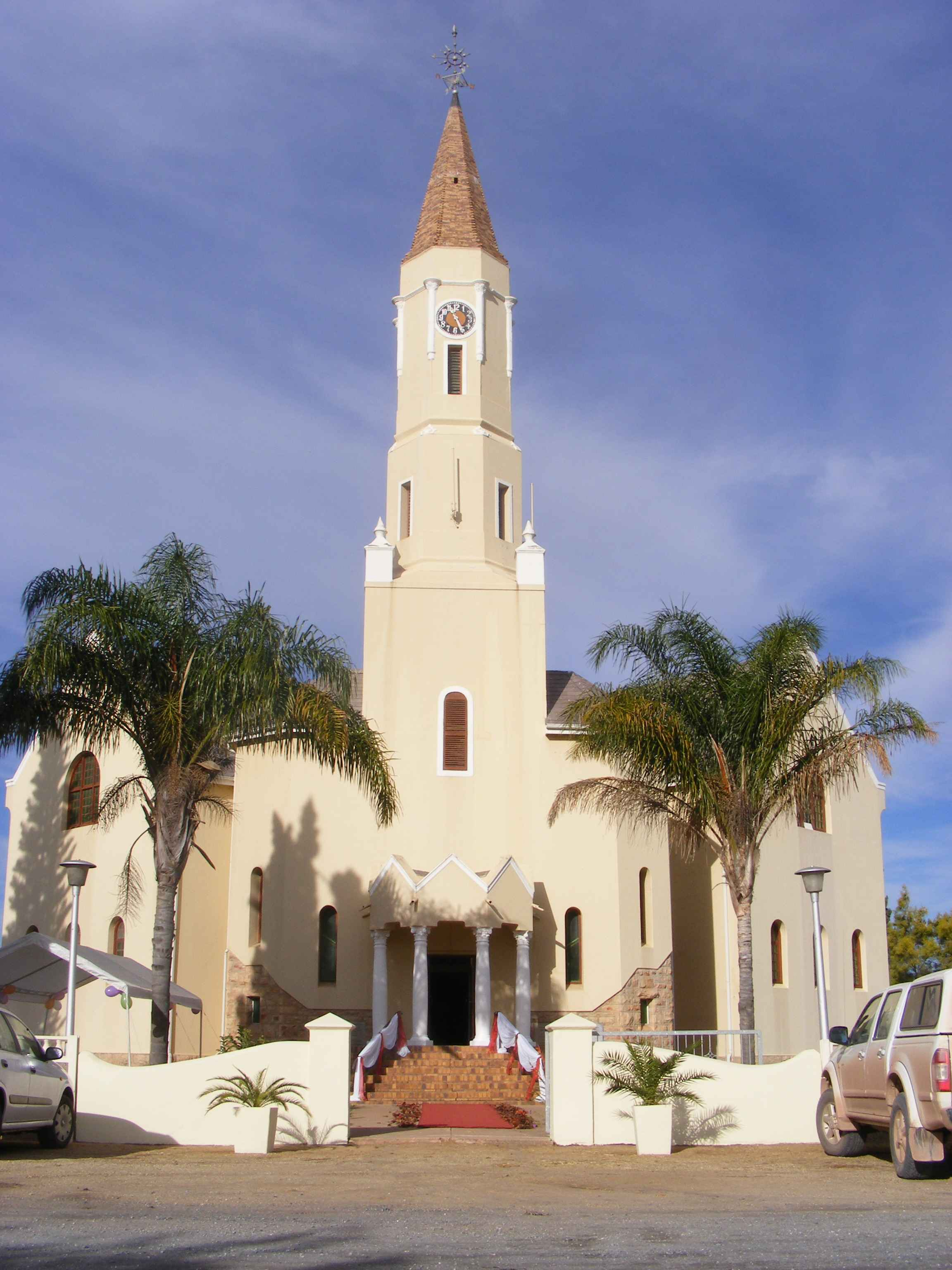
- Dutch Reformed Church
- 32°28′47″S 18°32′19″E
- Location: Redelinghuys
- Country: South Africa
- Denomination: Nederduits Gereformeerde Kerk

History
- Founded: 1906

Architecture
- Functional status: Church

The Dutch Reformed Church in Redelinghuys is a congregation in the Western Cape Synod of the Dutch Reformed Church, with its centre in the Sandveld village of Redelinghuys. It was separated from the mother congregation of Piketberg on 26 April 1906, just one day after the Aurora congregation; for this reason these congregations are sometimes referred to as the twins of Piketberg.

== Background ==
The nucleus of this congregation was the church farm Wittedrift next to the Verlorenvlei. As early as 1866, J.N. Redelinghuis gave 300 morgen of this farm to the church council of Piketberg, with the aim of erecting an outdoor church there. Although the construction of this auxiliary church on Wittedrift had already begun during the ministry of Rev. P.J.G. de Vos, there was such a lack of money that it was only completed and consecrated in the early seventies of the 19th century by Rev. C. Rabie of Piketberg.

In April 1867, the church council of Piketberg decided to hold outdoor church on Wittedrift regularly every three months and to distribute the Lord's Supper there once a year. A standing commission of six members was to supervise this church farm. To prevent future difficulties, the church council of Piketberg decided in April 1895 to have the church land on Wittedrift surveyed. Meanwhile, more than 10 years would pass before the church farm at Wittedrift would be separated as an independent congregation. The Presbytery Commission, on behalf of the Presbytery of Clanwilliam, separated the congregation of Aurora on 25 April 1906; and a day later, on 26 April 1906, the same commission, at a congregational meeting in the old church at Wittedrift, established the congregation of Redelinghuys, with a membership of 789, a church council consisting of six elders and eight deacons and the minister of Leipoldtville as consultant. In memory of the deceased donor of the church land, Mr. J.N. Redelinghuis, the name Redelinghuys was given to it.

== 2019 fire ==
The church was destroyed by fire on April 9, 2019. The blaze, which occurred around 7:00 AM, caused the steeple to collapse. The fire was suspected to have been caused by an electrical fault. Because the church tower housed antennas and base stations for providers like Vodacom and MTN, the fire left the town without cellphone reception for several days. The community was left devastated by the loss of the "spiritual heart" of the town. Services were moved to the nearby church hall, which remained undamaged by the fire.

== Ministers ==
- David Johannes de Villiers, 1906–1920
- Izak Joshua Minnaar, 1921 to 1929, and again from 1931 to 18 April 1947 (died in office)
- Jan Jakob Daniël Malan, 1929–1931
- Johannes Lodewickus van Rooyen, 1949–1953
- Jacobus Petrus Johannes Botes, 1971–1975
