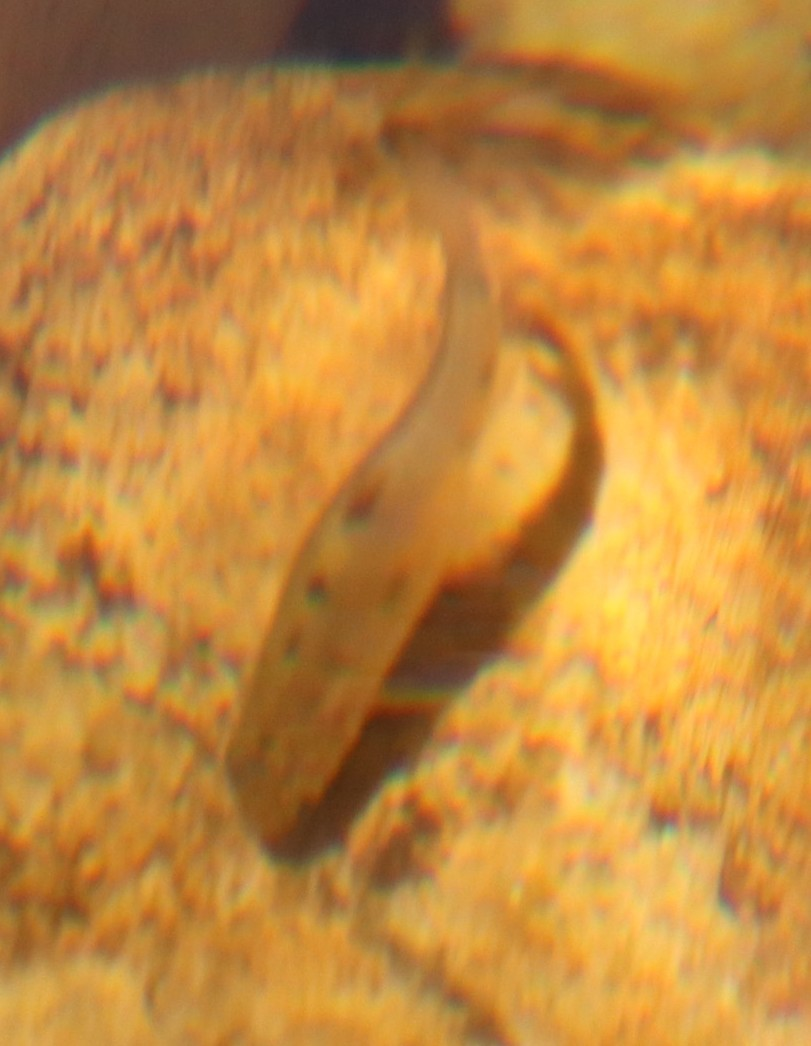
- Berg River redfin photographed in Haweqwa Nature Reserve, South Africa

Conservation status
- Endangered (IUCN 3.1)

Scientific classification
- Kingdom: Animalia
- Phylum: Chordata
- Class: Actinopterygii
- Order: Cypriniformes
- Family: Cyprinidae
- Subfamily: Smiliogastrinae
- Genus: Pseudobarbus
- Species: P. burgi

Binomial name
- Pseudobarbus burgi (Boulenger, 1911)

Synonyms
- Barbus burgi Boulenger, 1911

= Berg River redfin =

Species of fish

The Berg River redfin (Pseudobarbus burgi) or Berg redfin is an African freshwater fish species in the family Cyprinidae. The Burchell's redfin (P. burchelli), the type species of its genus Pseudobarbus, is a very close relative. The Berg River redfin is tetraploid.

It is endemic to the Western Cape Province of South Africa, where it occurs in the upper Berg River and its tributaries Boesmans, Goedverwacht, Hugo, Krom, Leeu and Wemmers Rivers. Similar fishes in the Verlorenvlei have turned out to belong to a distinct species, which is undescribed as of 2007. Formerly a population of either species was also found in the Eerste River.

It inhabits clear oligotrophic waters with low hardness. This species is considered Endangered by the IUCN as it has declined much in recent decades; at least in the Boesmans River its numbers are still dropping. Apart from overuse of the rivers' water, the main threats are the introduced rainbow trout (Oncorhynchus mykiss) and smallmouth bass (Micropterus dolomieu). In particular the latter simply eats up the entire stock of Berg River Redfins whenever it manages to settle a stretch of river. The higher reaches of the rivers are too cold for the bass to thrive; here, the trout are the bigger problem. The impact of the African catfish (Clarias gariepinus), another non-native species, has not yet been assessed, as it has not been present for long. No conservation plan has been proposed for P. burgi yet.
