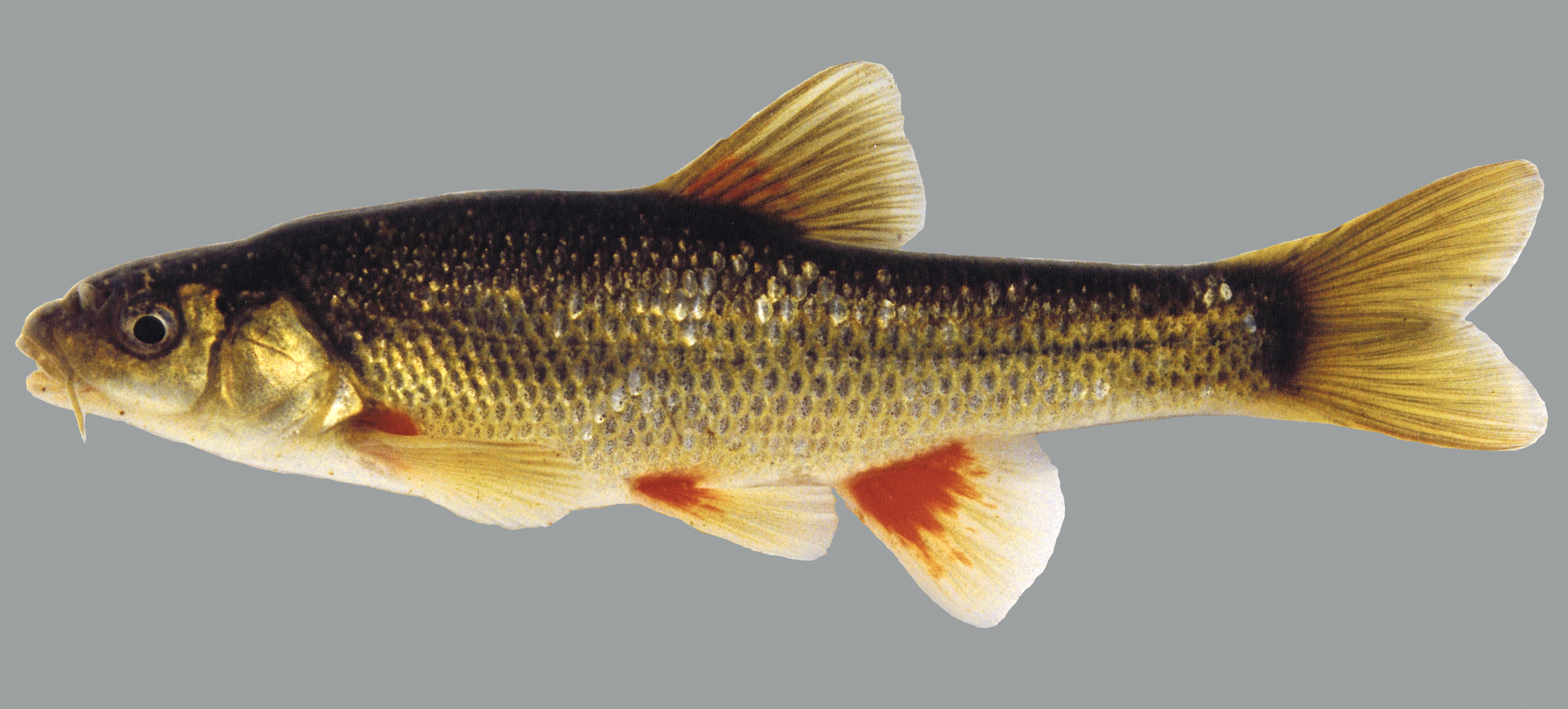

Conservation status
- Vulnerable (IUCN 3.1)

Scientific classification
- Kingdom: Animalia
- Phylum: Chordata
- Class: Actinopterygii
- Order: Cypriniformes
- Family: Cyprinidae
- Genus: Pseudobarbus
- Species: P. asper

Binomial name
- Pseudobarbus asper (Boulenger, 1911)

Synonyms
- Barbus asper Boulenger, 1911

= Smallscale redfin =

Species of fish

The smallscale redfin (Pseudobarbus asper) is a freshwater fish in the family Cyprinidae which is endemic to South Africa. It is threatened by habitat destruction and the impact of invasive species.

== Description ==
Its meristic data are that there are three-four dorsal fin spines and 7 rays while the nail fin has three spines and five rays and the lateral line has 37-40 small scales. It has a single pair of barbels and the males develop dark red fins and tubercles on the head when breeding. It grows to around 12 cm (4.7 in) total length.

== Distribution ==
Pseudobarbus asper occurs in the arid Karoo region of South Africa in the Gamtoos and Gourits River systems of the Eastern Cape in South Africa.

== Biology ==
The smallscale redfin is found in turbid, eutrophic waters which have soft silty beds or over boulders to boulder in the Karoo region of South Africa. Its small size is understood to be an adaptation to the highly variable environment this fish inhabits, making it able to exploit food resources occurring in small spaces such as under boulders. It has a relatively long gut and this allows it to exploit a wider range of food than related species. The juvenile fish are found in sheltered areas of the rivers such as erosion gullies and areas with high levels of vegetation cover. It has a "boom and bust" population level, breeding rapidly and expanding its population when conditions are suitable allowing it to colonise temporary habitats, the fish mature early breeding in their first year, can breed more than once a year, are fast growing and short-lived, their lifespan is three years compared to up to six years of the closely related Pseudobarbus afer. The adults are generally found in small groups. They breed during summer when they move into faster water to deposit their eggs. The eggs are deposited in mid channel crevices and have envelopes which may be slightly adhesive or not adhesive at all. After hatching the larvae are carried by the river's current to quieter stretches such as pools or backwaters where there are rich resources of food.

== Conservation ==
The species is threatened by the invasion of its rivers by invasive fish, in particular the North African catfish Clarias gariepinus which has become established in the Gamtoos River and is known to have been introduced to farm dams in the catchment of the Gourits River. The fish can be encouraged to breed by the release of water from dams and impoundments to simulate a spate.
