= Wittewater =

- Village
- Location within Western Cape Location within South Africa
- Coordinates: 32.915278°S 18.702°E
- Country: South Africa
- Province: Western Cape
- District: West Coast
- Municipality: Bergrivier

Area
  - Total: 0.48 km^{2} (0.19 sq mi)

Population (2011)
  - Total: 848
  - Density: 1,800/km^{2} (4,600/sq mi)

Racial makeup (2011)
  - Black African: 1.9%
  - Coloured: 98.0%
  - Indian/Asian: 0.1%

First languages (2011)
  - Afrikaans: 97.5%
  - English: 1.7%
  - Other: 0.8%
- Time zone: UTC+2 (SAST)
- PO box: 7322

Wittewater (Afrikaans: Wittewater, lit. 'white water') is a town in Bergrivier Local Municipality in the Western Cape province of South Africa, located off the R399 road, between Piketberg and Velddrif. It was established in the 1857 by German Moravian missionaries.

The town name, 'white water', references the waterfall that emerges behind it during winter rain.

== Geography ==
The village is situated at the southern foot of the Piketberg Mountains. It is located just off the R399 road, positioned between the towns of Piketberg and Velddrif. Its Afrikaans name translates directly to "white water," a reference to a seasonal waterfall that emerges on the mountain slopes behind the village during the winter rainy season.
