= Rumigny, Ardennes =

Rumigny
- Commune
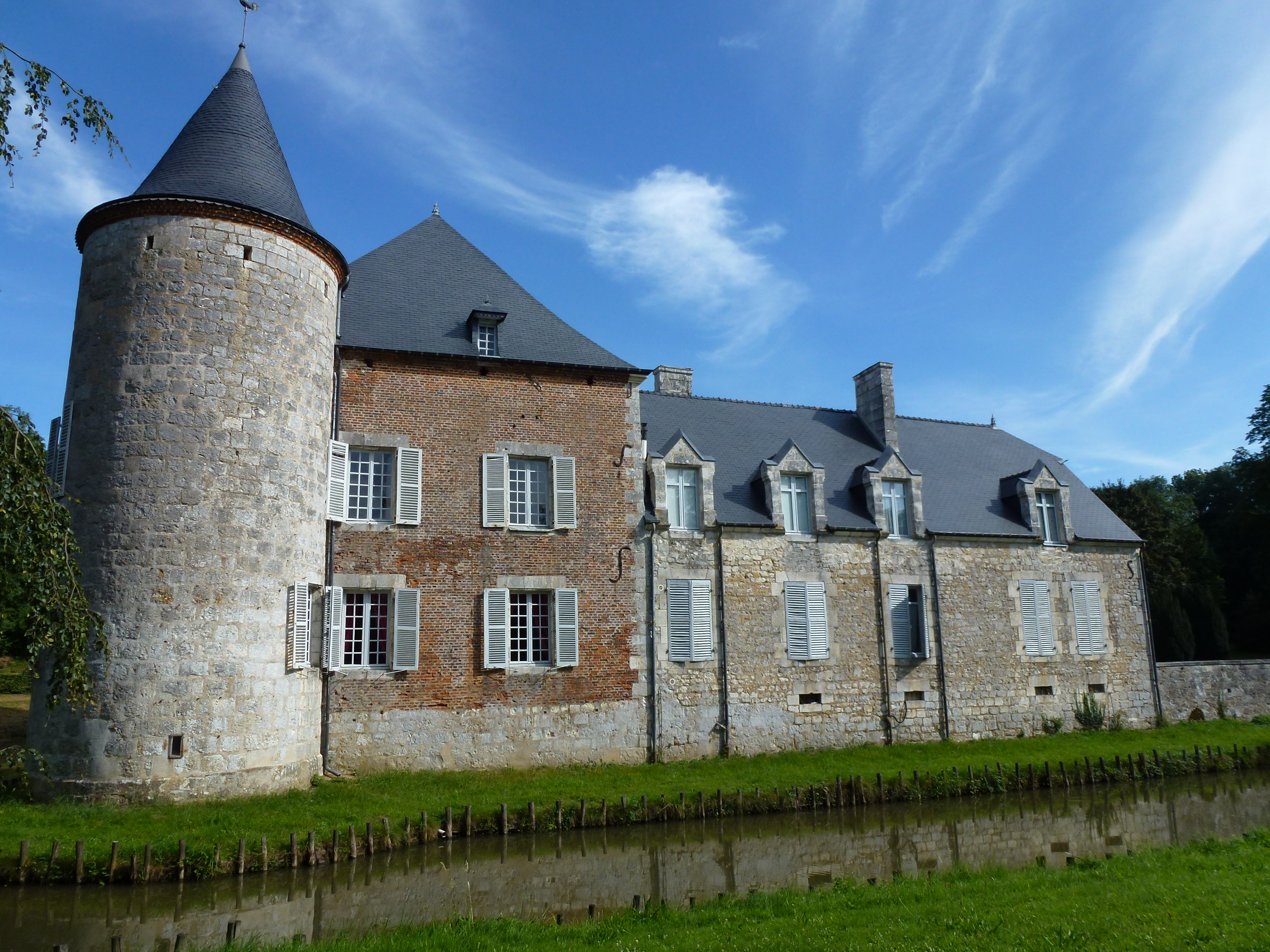
- Cour des Prés chateau

- Coat of arms
- Location of Rumigny
- Location within France Location within Grand Est
- Coordinates: 49°48′33″N 4°16′02″E
- Country: France
- Region: Grand Est
- Department: Ardennes
- Arrondissement: Charleville-Mézières
- Canton: Signy-l'Abbaye
- Intercommunality: Ardennes Thiérache

Government
  - Mayor (2020–2026): David Buridant
- Area^{1}: 17.38 km^{2} (6.71 sq mi)
- Elevation: 185 m (607 ft)
- Population (2023): 263
  - Density: 15.1/km^{2} (39.2/sq mi)
- Time zone: UTC+01:00 (CET)
  - Summer (DST): UTC+02:00 (CEST)
- INSEE/Postal code: 08373 /08290
- ^{1} French Land Register data, which excludes lakes, ponds, glaciers > 1 km^{2} (0.386 sq mi or 247 acres) and river estuaries.

Rumigny (French pronunciation: [ʁymiɲi]) is a commune in the Ardennes department in the Grand Est region in northern France.

It lies near Rozoy-sur-Serre, 12 km (7.5 mi) from Mon Idée on the border with Belgium, at the junction of routes D877 and D977.

== Population ==
Historical population
Year	Pop.	±% p.a.
1968	522	—
1975	472	−1.43%
1982	440	−1.00%
1990	378	−1.88%
1999	368	−0.30%
2007	377	+0.30%
2012	375	−0.11%
2017	328	−2.64%
2023	263	−3.61%
Source: INSEE

== Personalities ==
Rumigny was the birthplace of the astronomer Nicolas Louis de Lacaille.

== See also ==
- Communes of the Ardennes department
