= Verlorevlei River =

River in the Western Cape, South Africa

- Location within South Africa
- Etymology: Verlorenvlei River

Location
- Country: South Africa
- Province: Western Cape

Physical characteristics
- Source: _
- Mouth: Atlantic Ocean
  - location: Western Cape, South Africa
  - coordinates: 32°19′S 18°20′E
  - elevation: 0 m (0 ft)

Basin features

Ramsar Wetland
- Designated: 28 June 1991
- Reference no.: 525

Verlorevlei River is a river in the Western Cape province of South Africa. Lying on the Sandveld of the West Coast, the river runs past Eendekuil, Het Kruis, and Redelinghuys. The river mouth is located at Elands Bay. Its tributaries include the Hol River, Kruismans River and the Krom Antonies River. It falls within the Drainage system G and the Management Area.

The river is the only known habitat of the endangered Verlorenvlei redfin.

== History ==
Simon van der Stel visited in 1685 on his journey to Namaqualand, and he was under the impression that the river was a tributary of the Olifants River. Ensign Johannes Tobias Rhenius saw the lake as "lost" in the reeds in 1724, giving it its name (Afrikaans: verlore, lit. 'lost' and vlei, 'lake').

== Verlorevlei estuary ==
Around 30 km northwest of Redelinghuys, a marshy lake feeds the river. In the winter, it is kilometres long, and the water is concealed under the green reeds. In summer, the lake runs dry. 500 species of birds have been spotted here. The lake is popular with bird watchers and anglers alike. One of the country's few freshwater lakes by the coast, Verlorevlei Lake is an important breeding and feeding ground for pelicans, flamingoes, and other bird and fish species. Many species of plants are also found there. Cattle graze on the shores and water is pumped out for irrigation. In 1991, the wetland was named a Ramsar site. The estuary is considered an Important Bird and Biodiversity Area by BirdLife South Africa.

== Threats ==
The Verlorevlei river and estuary face threats of it drying up; flow reduction from the construction of illegal dams and polluted water from planned tungsten mining upstream and surrounding farms has degraded the surrounding environment. Water bird species has declined from 39 to 22 species.

== See also ==
- List of rivers of South Africa
- List of drainage basins of South Africa
- Water Management Areas
