= Aurora, South Africa =

Aurora
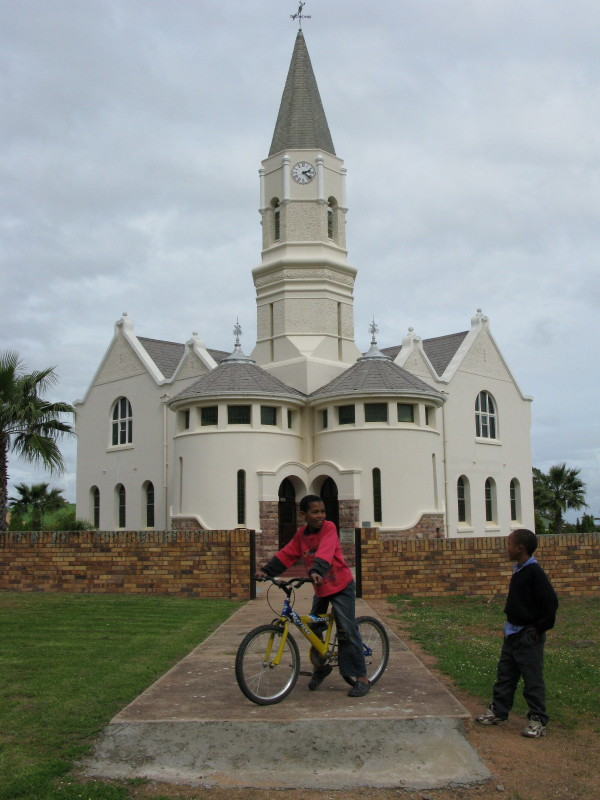
- Aurora Church

- Location within Western Cape Location within South Africa
- Coordinates: 32°42′S 18°29′E
- Country: South Africa
- Province: Western Cape
- District: West Coast
- Municipality: Bergrivier

Area
  - Total: 1.63 km^{2} (0.63 sq mi)

Population (2011)
  - Total: 578
  - Density: 355/km^{2} (918/sq mi)

Racial makeup (2011)
  - Black African: 0.5%
  - Coloured: 67.6%
  - Indian/Asian: 0.3%
  - White: 31.5%

First languages (2011)
  - Afrikaans: 92.3%
  - English: 6.4%
  - Other: 1.3%
- Time zone: UTC+2 (SAST)
- PO box: 7325
- Area code: 022

Aurora is a town on the west coast of South Africa situated 43 kilometres north-west of Piketberg and 29km south of Redelinghuys. Established in 1906, it was named after the Roman goddess of dawn.
