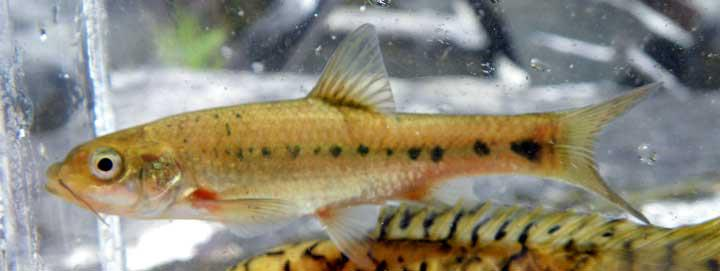
- Burchell's redfin (Pseudobarbus burchelli) from the Breede catchment

Scientific classification
- Kingdom: Animalia
- Phylum: Chordata
- Class: Actinopterygii
- Order: Cypriniformes
- Family: Cyprinidae
- Subfamily: Smiliogastrinae
- Genus: Pseudobarbus; A. Smith, 1841

Type species
- Barbus burchelli A. Smith, 1841

Species
- 11 species, see text

Synonyms
- Gnathendalia Castelnau, 1861; Oreodaimon Greenwood & Jubb, 1967

= Pseudobarbus =

Genus of fishes

Pseudobarbus is a ray-finned fish genus in the family Cyprinidae. The type species is Burchell's redfin (P. burchelli). The scientific name is derived from the Ancient Greek pseudes ("false") and the Latin word barbus ("beard", in reference to the barbels of barbs). This genus contains some (and might contain all) of the South African redfins. It was originally proposed as a subgenus, but has since been found worthy of recognition as a full genus.

This genus is restricted to southern Africa; all of its species were formerly placed in Barbus, the genus of typical barbels and their relatives. One taxon was originally described as P. leonhardi – this, however, was a European fish for which the genus was erroneously proposed anew. It has since turned out to be nothing other than the barbel B. peloponnesius.

== Species and systematics ==
Pseudobarbus was placed in the paraphyletic "subfamily" Barbinae by those that recognize that group, but if not included in the Cyprininae outright it might – like the other small African barbs – belong to an as yet unnamed subfamily.

Pseudobarbus contains the following species:

- Pseudobarbus afer (Peters, 1864) (Eastern Cape redfin)
- Pseudobarbus asper (Boulenger, 1911) (Smallscale redfin)
- Pseudobarbus burchelli (A. Smith, 1841) (Burchell's redfin)
- Pseudobarbus burgi (Boulenger, 1911) (Berg River redfin)
- Pseudobarbus kubhekai Zarei, Mathebula & Chakona, 2025
- Enteromius pallidus (A. Smith, 1841) (Goldie barb)
- Pseudobarbus phlegethon (Barnard, 1938) (Fiery redfin)
- Pseudobarbus quathlambae (Barnard, 1938) (Maluti redfin)
- Pseudobarbus senticeps (J. L. B. Smith, 1936)
- Pseudobarbus skeltoni Chakona & Swartz, 2013 (Giant redfin)
- Pseudobarbus swartzi Chakona & Skelton, 2017
- Pseudobarbus tenuis (Barnard, 1938) (Slender redfin)
- Pseudobarbus verloreni Chakona, Swartz & Skelton, 2014 (Verlorenvlei redfin)

Some South African "redfin" barb were previously placed in Barbus, mainly due to a lack of taxonomic and systematic study of that huge "wastebin genus". They formed a clade distinct from the traditional Pseudobarbus and were more plesiomorphic. Certainly, they did not belong in the typical barbel:
