= Redelinghuys =

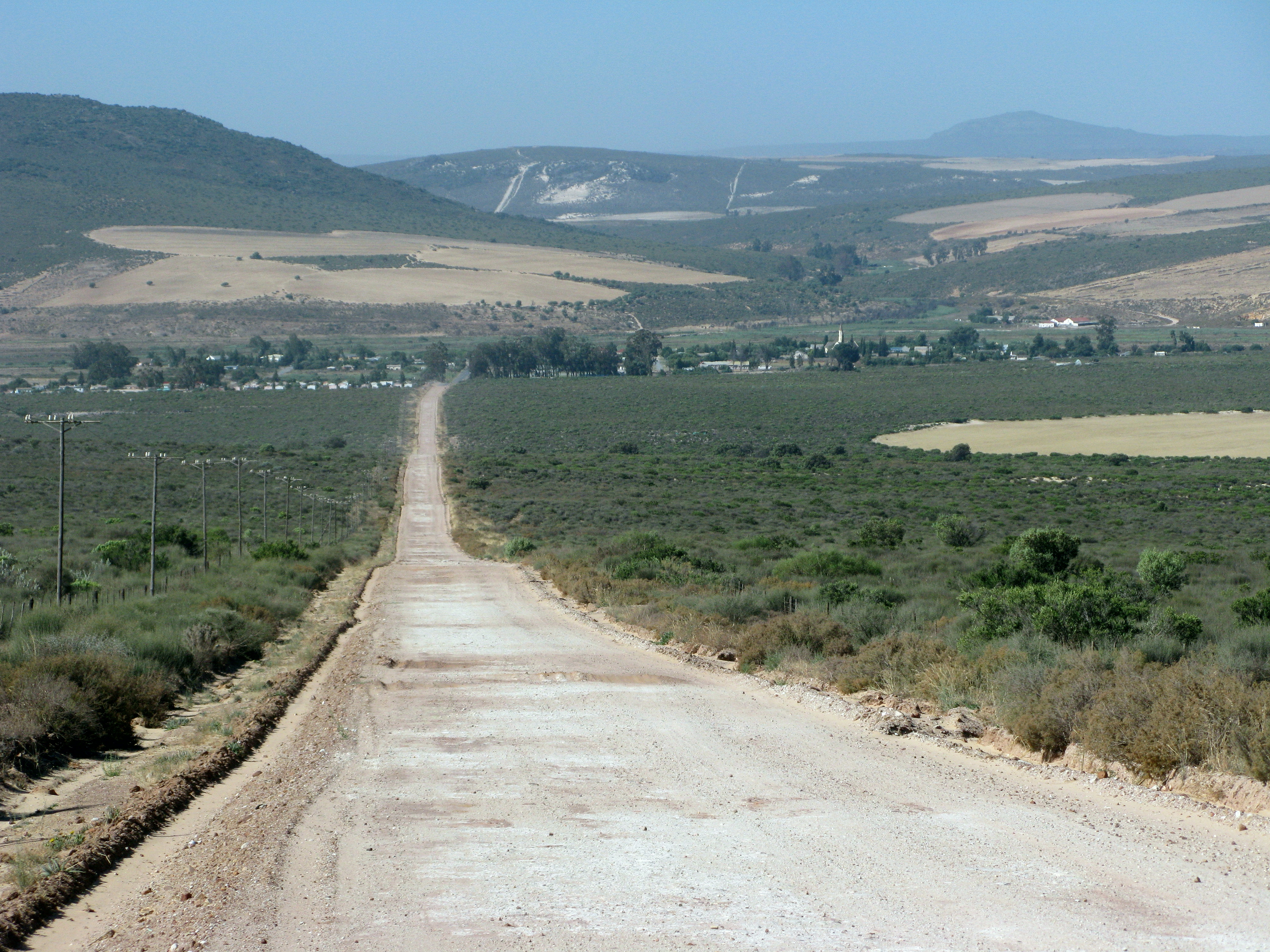
- Redelinghuys

- Location within Western Cape Location within South Africa
- Coordinates: 32°28′44″S 18°32′17″E
- Country: South Africa
- Province: Western Cape
- District: West Coast
- Municipality: Bergrivier

Area
  - Total: 2.12 km^{2} (0.82 sq mi)
- Elevation: 20 m (66 ft)

Population (2011)
  - Total: 574
  - Density: 271/km^{2} (701/sq mi)

Racial makeup (2011)
  - Black African: 23.2%
  - Coloured: 58.1%
  - Indian/Asian: 0.5%
  - White: 17.5%
  - Other: 0.7%

First languages (2011)
  - Afrikaans: 95.8%
  - English: 1.8%
  - Xhosa: 1.3%
  - Other: 1.1%
- Time zone: UTC+2 (SAST)
- Postal code (street): 8105
- PO box: 8105
- Area code: 022

Redelinghuys is a village in the Bergrivier Local Municipality in the Western Cape province of South Africa, located about 160 kilometres (100 mi) north of Cape Town on the Verlorevlei River. The 2001 Census recorded the population as 581 people in 167 households. The village is situated on the R366 regional route between Piketberg and Elands Bay. It is served by a police station, a public library, a satellite health clinic, and two primary schools. The town is also known for its 100-year-old Dutch Reformed Church, which was destroyed by a fire on April 9, 2019.

The town has a predominantly Victorian architecture.

== Verlorenvlei ==
On 23 September 2014 a part of the southern shore of the vlei was declared as a provincial heritage site for reasons associated with the vernacular fishing village located there. On the same date the Diepkloof Rock Shelter, an internationally important archaeological site associated with the emergence of modern humans and intrinsically connected to the ecology of the vlei, was also declared.

In 1991, the wetland was declared a Ramsar site. The estuary is considered an Important Bird and Biodiversity Area by BirdLife South Africa.

The river is the only known habitat of the endangered Verlorenvlei redfin.
