= Bergrivier Local Municipality =

Bergrivier
- Local municipality
- Seal

- Location in the Western Cape
- Coordinates: 32°45′S 18°45′E
- Country: South Africa
- Province: Western Cape
- District: West Coast
- Seat: Piketberg
- Wards: 7

Government
  - Type: Municipal council
  - Mayor: Ray van Rooy (DA)

Area
  - Total: 4,407 km^{2} (1,702 sq mi)

Population (2022)
  - Total: 70,276
  - Density: 15.95/km^{2} (41.30/sq mi)

Racial makeup (2022)
  - Black African: 10.3%
  - Coloured: 72.8%
  - Indian/Asian: 0.1%
  - White: 15.4%

First languages (2011)
  - Afrikaans: 90.7%
  - Xhosa: 3.8%
  - English: 2.5%
  - Other: 3%
- Time zone: UTC+2 (SAST)
- Municipal code: WC013

Bergrivier Municipality (Afrikaans: Bergrivier Munisipaliteit) is a local municipality in the Western Cape province of South Africa. It governs the towns of Piketberg (the seat of the municipal council), Velddrif and Porterville, as well as the surrounding villages and rural areas. As of 2011, it had a population of 61,897. It is located within the West Coast District Municipality and its municipality code is WC013.

== Geography ==
Topographic map of the Bergrivier Municipality

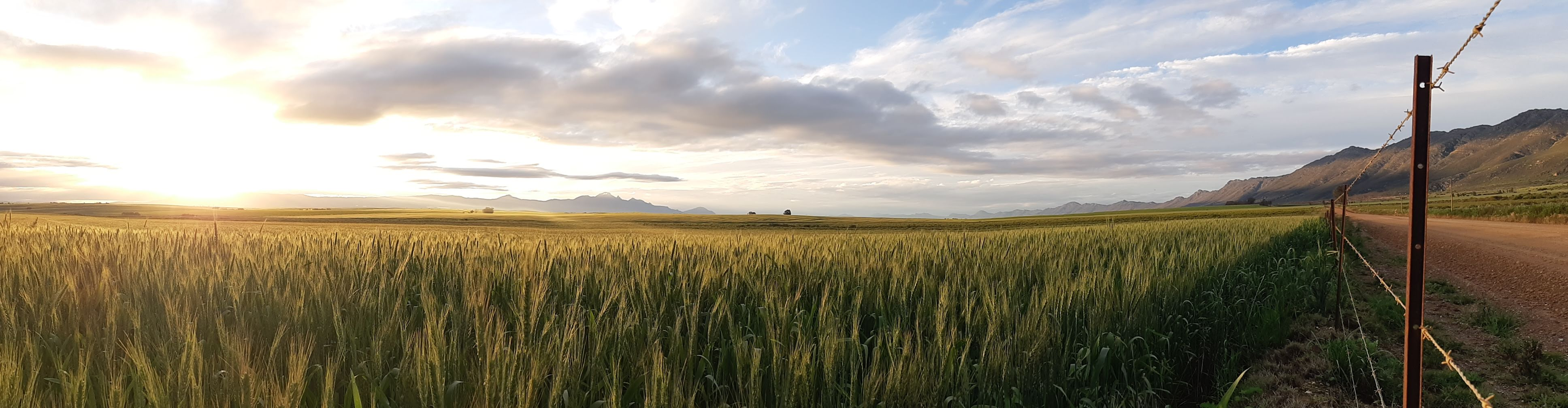
A wheat field near Porterville in the Bergriver Municipality. Wheat is a common crop in the area.

The municipality covers an area of 4,407 square kilometres (1,702 sq mi) stretching from the Atlantic Ocean in the west to the Groot Winterhoek Mountains in the east. Much of its southern border follows the Berg River, while to the north it stretches as far as the Olifants River Mountains. The Piketberg mountain occupies the middle of the area. To the north it abuts on the Cederberg Municipality, to the east the Witzenberg Municipality, and to the south the Drakenstein, Swartland and Saldanha Bay Municipalities.

== Demographics ==
At the time of the 2022 South African Census, the Bergrivier municipality had a population of 70,276, an increase of 11.74% from 2011. 72.8% of the population identified as "Coloured," 15.4% as "White," and 10.3% as "Black African."

According to the 2011 census the municipality has a population of 61,897 people in 16,275 households. Of this population, 70.9% describe themselves as "Coloured", 16.9% as "White", and 11.3% as "Black African". The first language of 90.7% of the population is Afrikaans, while 3.8% speak Xhosa and 2.5% speak English.

The municipal headquarters are in the town of Piketberg, which is situated slightly north of the Berg River on the eastern slope of the mountain also known as the Piketberg. According to the 2011 census, Piketberg has a population of 12,075. The other principal towns in the municipality are Velddrif (pop. 11,017) on the Atlantic coast at the mouth of the Berg River, and Porterville (pop. 7,057) on the edge of the Groot Winterhoek Mountains.

There are smaller agricultural villages in the vicinity of Piketberg at Goedverwacht (pop. 1,979) and Wittewater (pop. 848), and in the northern parts of the municipality at Aurora (pop. 578), Eendekuil (pop. 1,530), and Redelinghuys (pop. 574). Dwarskersbos (pop. 670) is a fishing village and coastal resort near Velddrif.

== History ==
At the end of the apartheid era, in the area that is today the Bergrivier Municipality there were municipal councils for Piketberg, Velddrif, Porterville, Eendekuil, Aurora, and Redelinghuys. These councils were elected by the white residents, while the coloured residents of the towns were governed by management committees subordinate to the white councils. Dwarskersbos was governed by a local council, and the remaining rural areas were served by the West Coast Regional Services Council.

While the negotiations to end apartheid were taking place a process was established for local authorities to negotiate voluntary mergers. Some towns in the Bergrivier took part in this process, which resulted in the municipalities merging with their respective management committees to form new non-racial municipalities: Piketberg and Aurora in August 1992, and Eendekuil in January 1993.

After the national elections of 1994 a process of local government transformation began, in which negotiations were held between the existing local authorities, political parties, and local community organisations. As a result of these negotiations, the existing local authorities were dissolved and transitional local councils (TLCs) were created for each town and village.

- Porterville TLC replaced Porterville Municipality and Porterville Management Committee in October 1994.
- Piketberg TLC replaced Piketberg and Eendekuil Municipalities in December 1994.
- Velddrif TLC replaced Velddrif Municipality, Velddrif Management Committee and Dwarskersbos Local Council in October 1994.
- Redelinghuys TLC replaced Redelinghuys Municipality and Redelinghuys Management Committee in October 1994.
- Aurora Municipality was declared to be a TLC in October 1995.

The transitional councils were initially made up of members nominated by the various parties to the negotiations, until May 1996 when elections were held. At these elections the West Coast District Council was established, replacing the West Coast Regional Services Council. Transitional representative councils (TRCs) were also elected to represent rural areas outside the TLCs on the District Council; the area that was to become Bergrivier Municipality included most of the Piketberg TRC.

At the local elections of December 2000 the TLCs and TRCs were dissolved and the Bergrivier Municipality was established as a single local authority incorporating both rural and urban areas. In 2006 the boundary of the municipality was extended slightly to take over a strip of land on the left bank of the Berg River adjacent to Velddrif, which had previously belonged to the Saldanha Bay Municipality.

== Politics ==
The municipal council consists of thirteen members elected by mixed-member proportional representation. Seven councillors are elected by first-past-the-post voting in seven wards, while the remaining six are chosen from party lists so that the total number of party representatives is proportional to the number of votes received.

In the election of 4 November 2026 the Democratic Alliance (DA) obtained a majority of nine seats on the council.

The following table shows the results of the 2026 election.

Party	Ward			List			Total seats
Party	Votes	%	Seats	Votes	%	Seats	Total seats
Democratic Alliance	11,684	64.58	7	11,551	63.91	2	9
Patriotic Alliance	2,427	13.41	0	3,265	18.06	2	2
African National Congress	1,825	10.09	0	1,357	7.51	1	1
Freedom Front Plus	938	5.18	0	1,022	5.65	1	1
Independent candidates	172	0.95	0				0
10 other parties	1,047	5.79	0	879	4.86	0	0
Total	18,093	100.00	7	18,074	100.00	6	13
Valid votes	18,093	98.60		18,074	99.19		
Invalid/blank votes	256	1.40		147	0.81		
Total votes	18,349	100.00		18,221	100.00		
Registered voters/turnout	32,950	55.69		32,950	55.30		
