= Maclear's Beacon =

Trig beacon on Table Mountain, South Africa

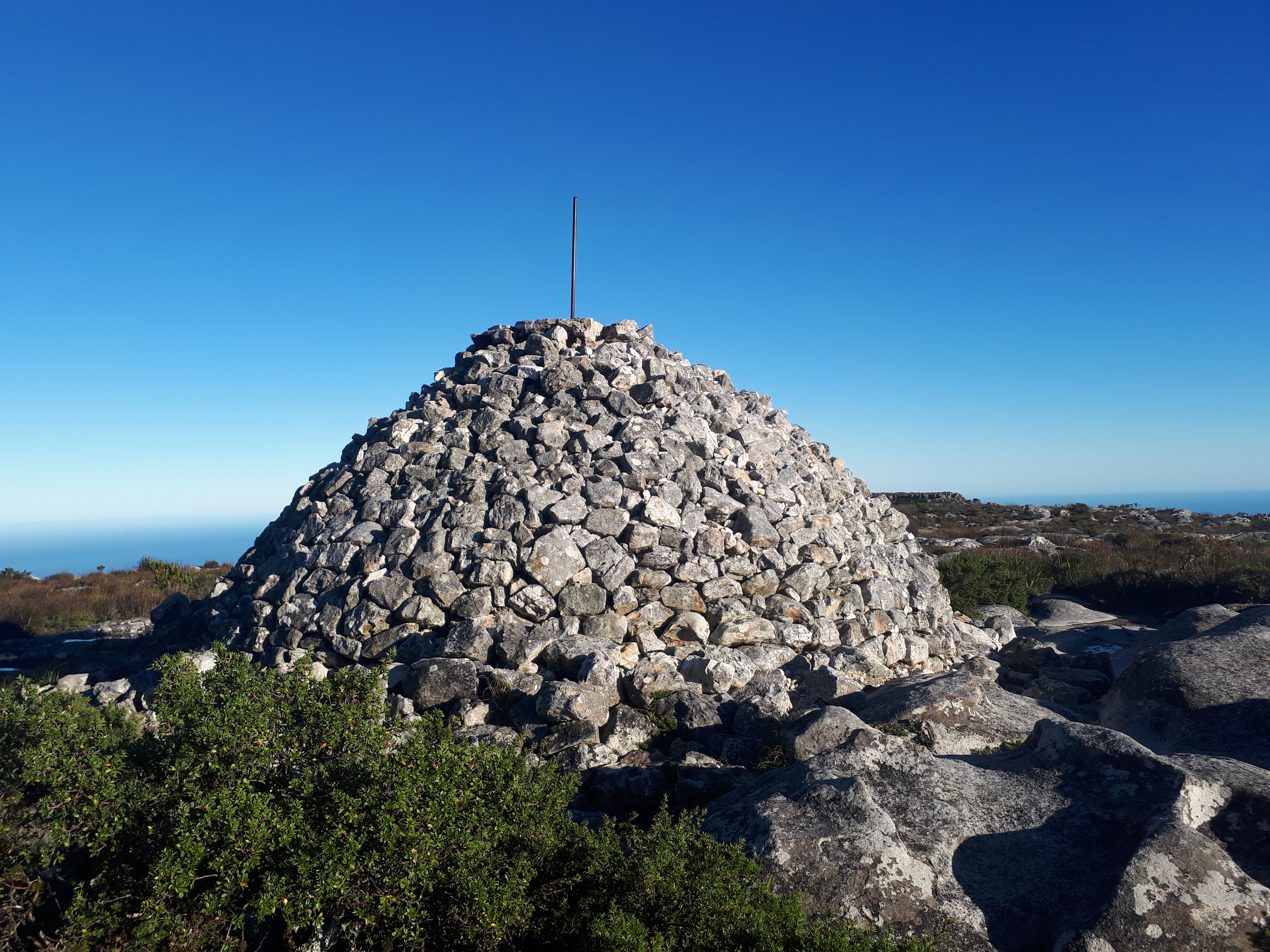
- Maclear's Beacon on top of Table Mountain
- Interactive map of Maclear's Beacon
- Location: Table Mountain, Cape Town, South Africa
- Coordinates: 33°58′01″S 18°25′32″E
- Designer: Thomas Maclear
- Material: Rock
- Height: 5 metres (16 ft)
- Completion date: December 1844
- Dedicated to: Thomas Maclear

Maclear's Beacon is a triangulation station used in Maclear's arc measurement for Earth's circumference determination.

The beacon is situated on top of Table Mountain in Cape Town, South Africa. It is situated on the Eastern end on the plateau of the mountain, roughly 3 km (1.9 mi) from the Cable Car Station.

The beacon is 1,086 metres (3,563 ft) above sea level, 19 metres (62 ft) higher than the upper cable car station. The structure consists of man made rock packed in a triangle form, being 5 metres (16 ft) high. It was painted in lamp black colour to make it visible, when light shown on it.

In December 1844, the Astronomer Royal at the Cape, Thomas Maclear, instructed his assistant William Mann to build a beacon in the form of a pile of rocks which would be used to confirm and possibly expand on the existing curvature of the Earth data of Nicolas-Louis de Lacaille. This data was in connection with the Cape arc of the meridian. Initially the beacon had no name but in later years it was named after Maclear.

In 1929, the pile of stones collapsed and it was restored in 1979 to commemorate the centenary of Maclear's death.

The beacon is still used by cartographers today. It has become a tourist attraction and hiking trails over the mountain pass next to the beacon. It is also a National Monument.

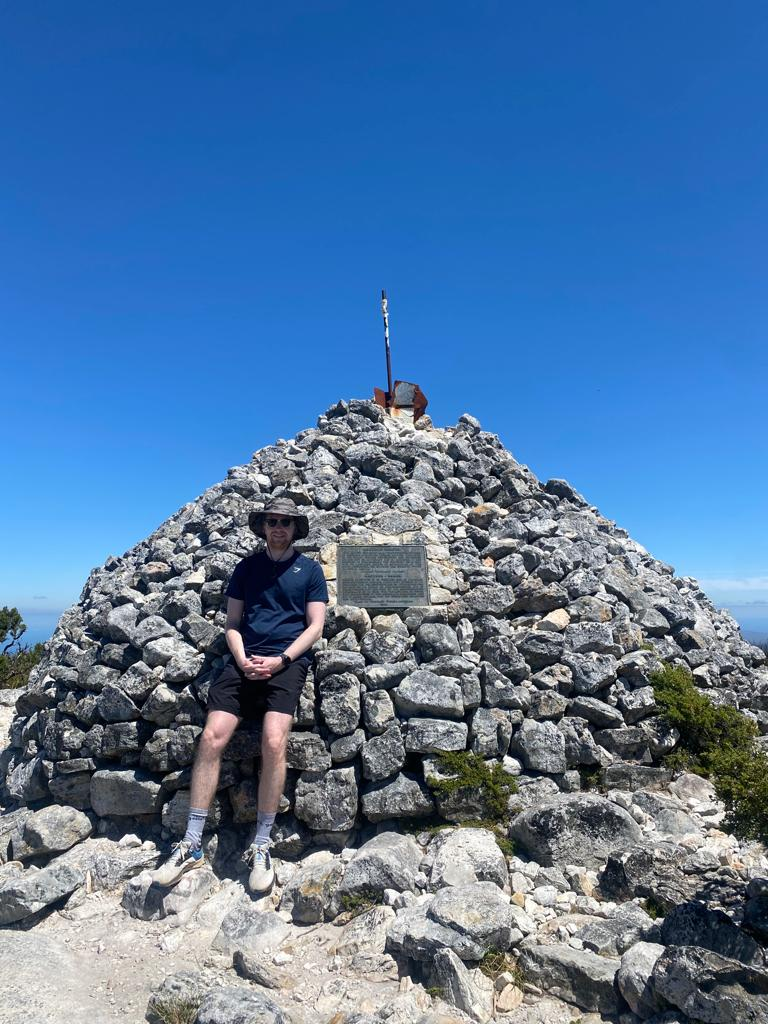
Maclear's Beacon, Table Mountain, Cape Town, 2023

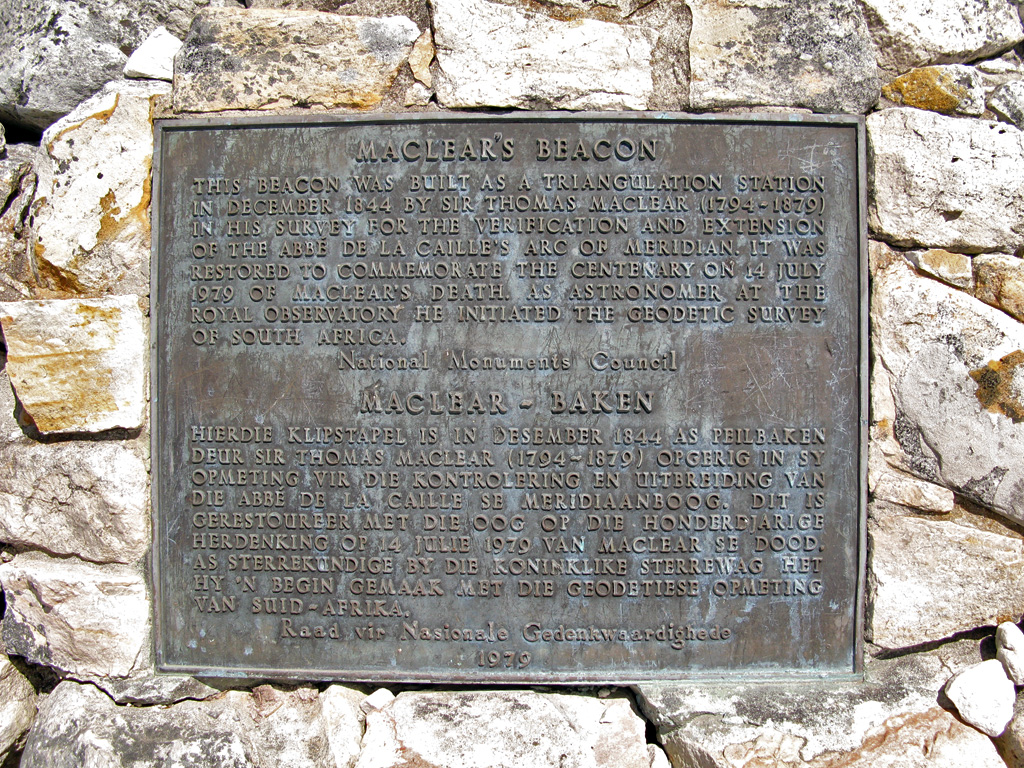
Plaque on Maclear's Beacon
