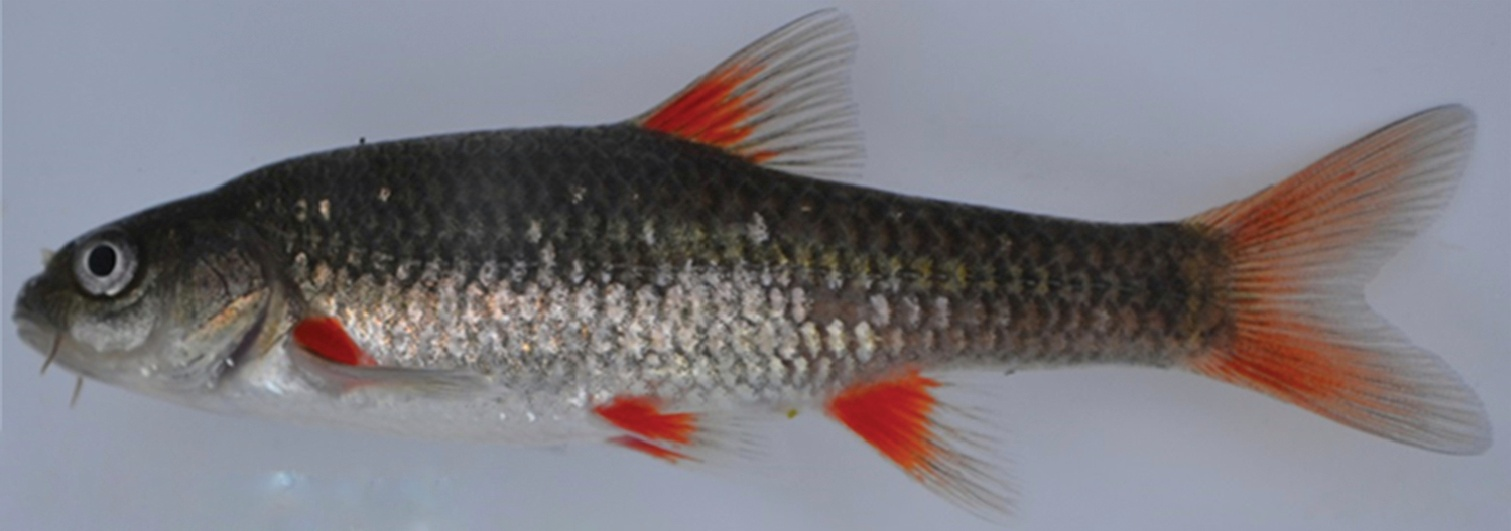

Conservation status
- Endangered (IUCN 3.1)

Scientific classification
- Kingdom: Animalia
- Phylum: Chordata
- Class: Actinopterygii
- Order: Cypriniformes
- Family: Cyprinidae
- Subfamily: Smiliogastrinae
- Genus: Pseudobarbus
- Species: P. afer

Binomial name
- Pseudobarbus afer (Peters, 1864)

Synonyms
- Barbus afer Peters, 1864

= Eastern Cape redfin =

Species of fish

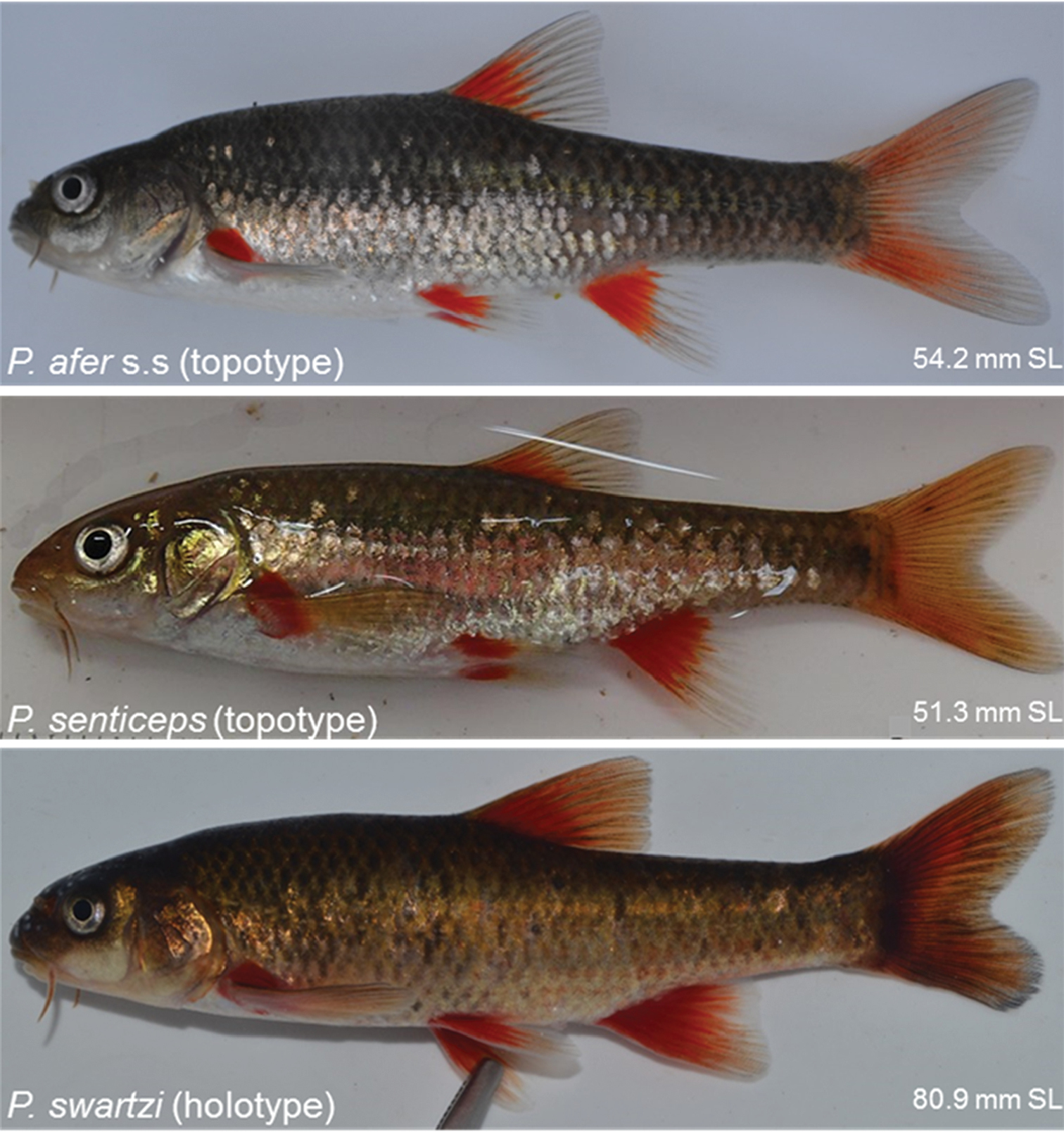
The lineages of Pseudobarbus afer sensu lato

The Eastern Cape redfin (Pseudobarbus afer) is an African freshwater fish species in the family Cyprinidae, this appears to be a species complex rather than a single species.

It is endemic to the Sundays, Swartkops and Baakens river systems of the Eastern Cape, South Africa, the fish in other rivers in the region have been suggested to belong to different species with four different lineages recognised, a forest lineage which appears to be more closely related to Pseudobarbus phlegethon of the Olifants River than the other lineages traditionally classified within P. afer, the other lineages are the "St Francis" lineage which occurs in the rivers flowing into St Francis Bay and has been given the name Pseudobarbus swartzi, the Krom lineage Pseudobarbus senticeps from the Krom River system and the "Mandela" lineage Pseudobarbus afer sensu stricto. All of these populations are becoming rare due to habitat destruction and the impact of invasive species especially exotic bass of the genus Micropterus.

Pseudobarbus afer prefers clear rocky pools in the rivers it inhabits. The fry and juveniles form large shoals, the adults form smaller groups. It was formerly common and widely distributed, but Pseudobarbus afer sensu lato has undergone steep declines in both abundance and range, a primary cause being the introduction of exotic fish species which compete with these fish and also predate them. Other threats include deterioration of water quality and the degradation of habitat. These fish are omnivorous, bottom feeders which eat algae and prey on small invertebrates. They breed during the summer, laying their eggs in riffles above pools.
