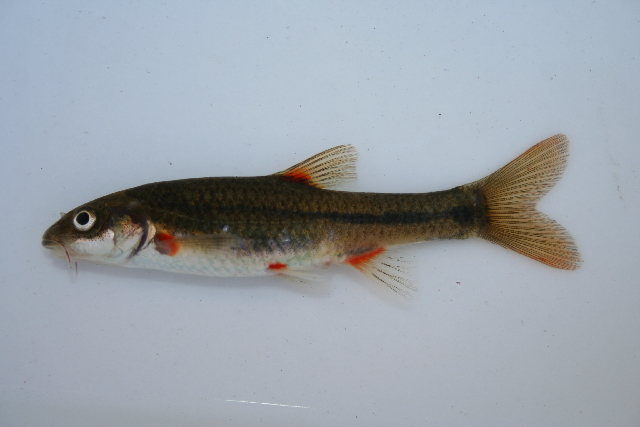

Conservation status
- Near Threatened (IUCN 3.1)

Scientific classification
- Kingdom: Animalia
- Phylum: Chordata
- Class: Actinopterygii
- Order: Cypriniformes
- Family: Cyprinidae
- Subfamily: Smiliogastrinae
- Genus: Pseudobarbus
- Species: P. tenuis

Binomial name
- Pseudobarbus tenuis (Barnard, 1938)

Synonyms
- Barbus tenuis Barnard, 1938

= Slender redfin =

Species of fish

The slender redfin (Pseudobarbus tenuis) is an African freshwater fish species in the family Cyprinidae.

It is endemic to South Africa, and becoming rare due to habitat destruction and the impact of invasive species.
