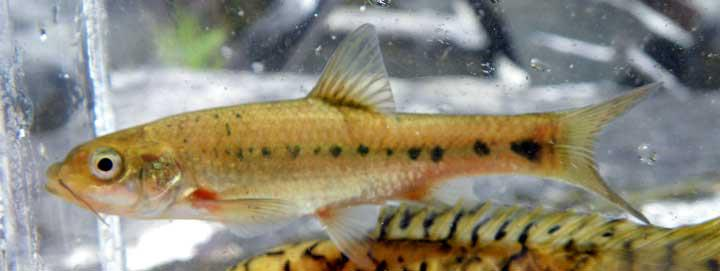
- Burchell's redfin from the Breede catchment

Conservation status
- Critically Endangered (IUCN 3.1)

Scientific classification
- Kingdom: Animalia
- Phylum: Chordata
- Class: Actinopterygii
- Order: Cypriniformes
- Family: Cyprinidae
- Subfamily: Smiliogastrinae
- Genus: Pseudobarbus
- Species: P. burchelli

Binomial name
- Pseudobarbus burchelli (A. Smith, 1841)

Synonyms
- Barbus burchelli Smith, 1841; Barbus gobionides Valenciennes, 1842; Gnatendalia vulnerata Castelnau, 1861; Barbus vulneratus (Castelnau, 1861); Barbus multimaculatus Steindachner, 1870

= Burchell's redfin =

Species of fish

Burchell's redfin (Pseudobarbus burchelli), also known as the Tradouw redfin, Tradou redfin or Breede redfin, is an African freshwater fish species in the family Cyprinidae. P. burchelli is the type species of its genus Pseudobarbus, and like all of these is tetraploid. The Berg River redfin (P. burgi) is a very close relative.

It is endemic to the Western Cape Province of South Africa, where it occurs in the Moeras and Tradouw Rivers. Whether the similar fishes from the Breede River and Heuningnes River are also P. burchelli is undetermined.

Two populations are known with certainty, one in the Moeras River at Barrydale and one at the Tradouw River at Tradouws Pass. During summer, low water levels cut off gene flow between these two. The species inhabits deeper sections of the rivers' somewhat peaty water. Other fish are rare, and in Burchell's redfin's range these seem to consist of the introduced bluegill (Lepomis macrochirus) and Banded Tilapia (Tilapia sparrmanii) only.

The introduced smallmouth bass (Micropterus dolomieu) is expanding in the region and apparently destroys P. burchelli stocks as it does so. Human interference with the river's flow around Barrydale as well as water pollution have reached dangerous proportions. Consequently, Burchell's redfin is considered to be in serious danger of going extinct within a few years. It is assessed to be critically endangered by the IUCN; no conservation plan has been proposed for the species yet.
