= Wemmers River =

River in the Western Cape, South Africa

- Location within South Africa

Location
- Country: South Africa
- Region: Franschhoek, Western Cape

Physical characteristics
- Mouth
  - coordinates: 33°50′1″S 19°5′20″E

The Wemmers River is a river near Franschhoek in the Western Cape Province of South Africa.

== Dams ==
- Wemmershoek Dam

== See also ==
- List of rivers in South Africa
