= Fiery redfin =

Conservation status
- Endangered (IUCN 3.1)

Scientific classification
- Kingdom: Animalia
- Phylum: Chordata
- Class: Actinopterygii
- Order: Cypriniformes
- Family: Cyprinidae
- Subfamily: Smiliogastrinae
- Genus: Pseudobarbus
- Species: P. phlegethon

Binomial name
- Pseudobarbus phlegethon (Barnard, 1938)

Synonyms
- Barbus phlegethon Barnard, 1938

Species of fish

The fiery redfin (Pseudobarbus phlegethon) is an African freshwater fish species in the family Cyprinidae.

The fish is endemic to South Africa, where it can be found in the Oudste, Thee, Noordhoeks, Boskloof and Rondegat tributaries of the Olifants River system on the western side of the Cederberg Mountains where it is threatened by habitat destruction and the impact of invasive species including Grass carp, Largemouth bass, Rainbow trout and Sharp-tooth catfish.

Fiery redfins prefer stoney habitat in the lower reaches of tributary streams, with moderate flow. The fiery redfin can grow to around 70 mm in length, males have bright red fins in the breeding season and defend their territories.
