= Giant redfin =

Scientific classification
- Kingdom: Animalia
- Phylum: Chordata
- Class: Actinopterygii
- Order: Cypriniformes
- Family: Cyprinidae
- Subfamily: Smiliogastrinae
- Genus: Pseudobarbus
- Species: P. skeltoni

Binomial name
- Pseudobarbus skeltoni Chakona & Swartz, 2013

Species of fish

The giant redfin (Pseudobarbus skeltoni) is an African freshwater fish species in the family Cyprinidae.

It is endemic to the Breede River system in South Africa.
