= Dutch Reformed Church, Piketberg =

Church in Piketberg, South Africa

Dutch Reformed Church
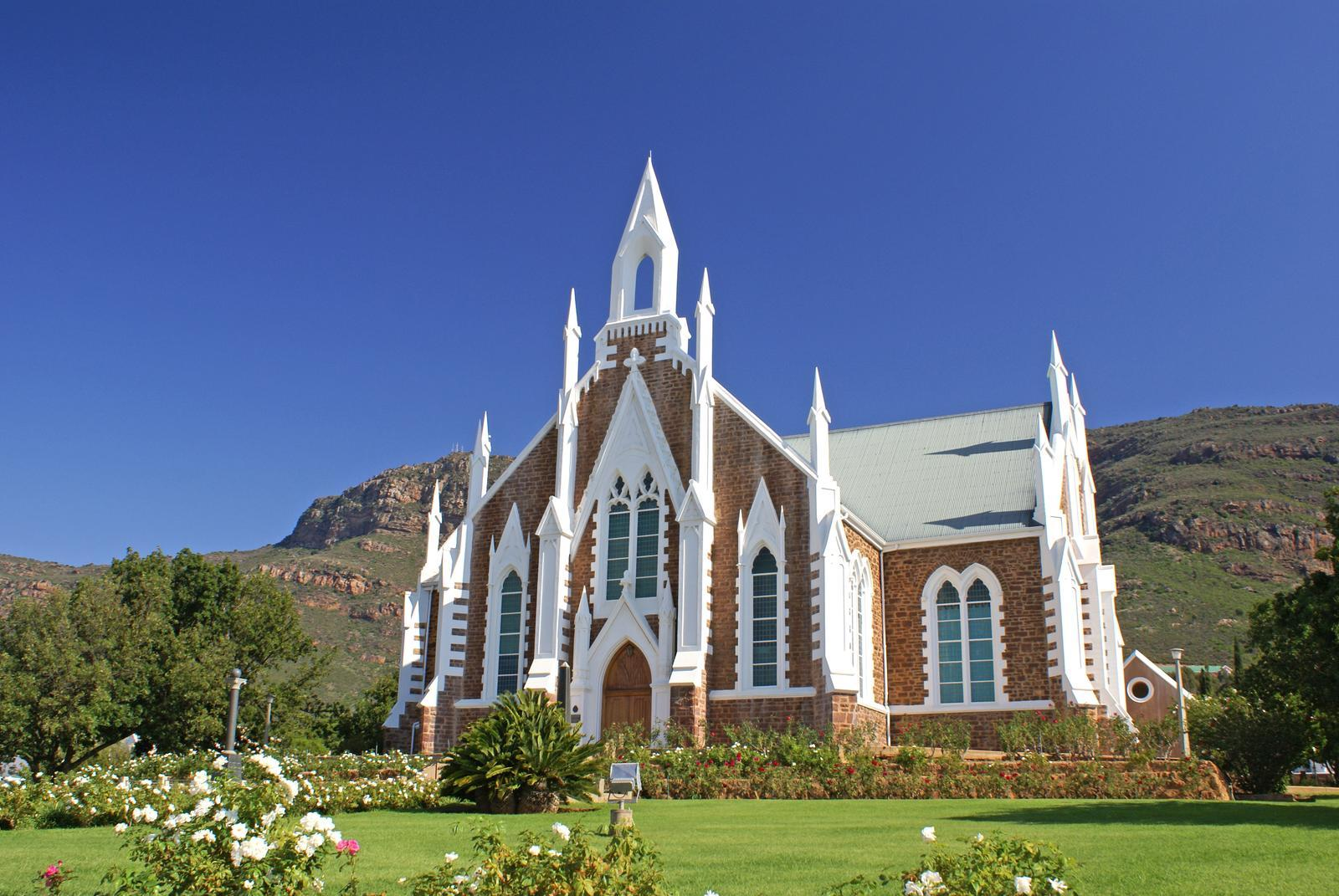
- Dutch Reformed Church
- 32°54′23″S 18°45′11″E
- Location: Piketberg
- Country: South Africa
- Denomination: Nederduits Gereformeerde Kerk

History
- Founded: 1833

Architecture
- Functional status: Church

The Dutch Reformed Church in Piketberg, South Africa, is the oldest congregation of the Dutch Reformed Church between Malmesbury and Clanwilliam. It is the 23rd congregation founded in the Cape Colony, but because the Dutch Reformed Church, Stockenström no longer exists, it is now the 22nd oldest. The church was designed by Carl Otto Hager. The interior boasts a beautiful, hand crafted pulpit carved from imported wood from India as well as Yellowwood and Oregon pine.

The Piketberg congregation was established in the year 1833. In May 1833, the first church council was appointed by the governor, Sir Galbraith Lowry Cole. On 23 July 1833, Rev. William Robertson of Clanwilliam was appointed as consultant and the first service for the new congregation was held by him at Groenvlei. The first church council was later consecrated at Deze Hoek.

Elder Burger offered to build a temporary church at Deze Hoek at his own expense and had already begun to do so when he died towards the end of 1834. After repeated unsuccessful attempts to purchase the well-watered farm Klein Vogelvallei from the widow Gideon Rossouw for town and church land, Governor Cole ceded the government farm Grootfontein to the church council free of charge. Dr. Robertson, the founder of the congregation, was transferred from Clanwilliam to Swellendam and Rev. J.C. Moorrees van Swartland became consultant of Piketberg (1834–’80).

The church building, which had already been started in 1833, was dedicated on 8 October 1836 and the first house visit in the Piketbergse Vlakte was held in October 1838 by the consultant, who pointed out in his Presbyterian Report the large population in this neighbourhood. At the request of the church council, the Presbytery made a presentation to the government for a pastor, but the objection was the financial expense. The church council then decided to support its pastor itself with help from Swartland.

Dr. John William Louis Scholtz was appointed as the first minister. He was born in Malmesbury and received his doctorate from the University of Groningen. He was the first minister to be ordained by the laying on of hands in South Africa (1840). The present church building, consecrated in 1882, stands on the same site as the old cross church.
