= Piketberg =

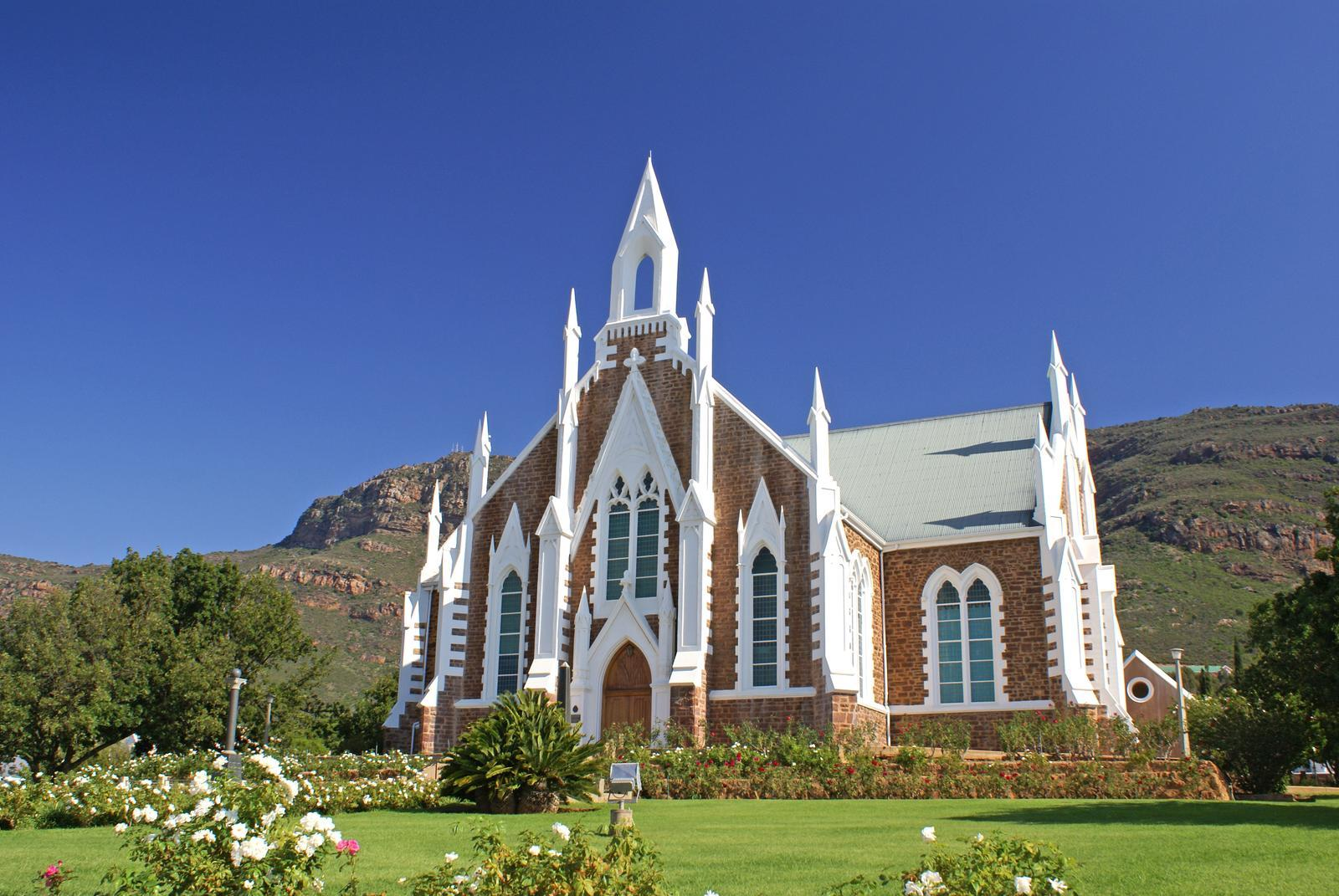
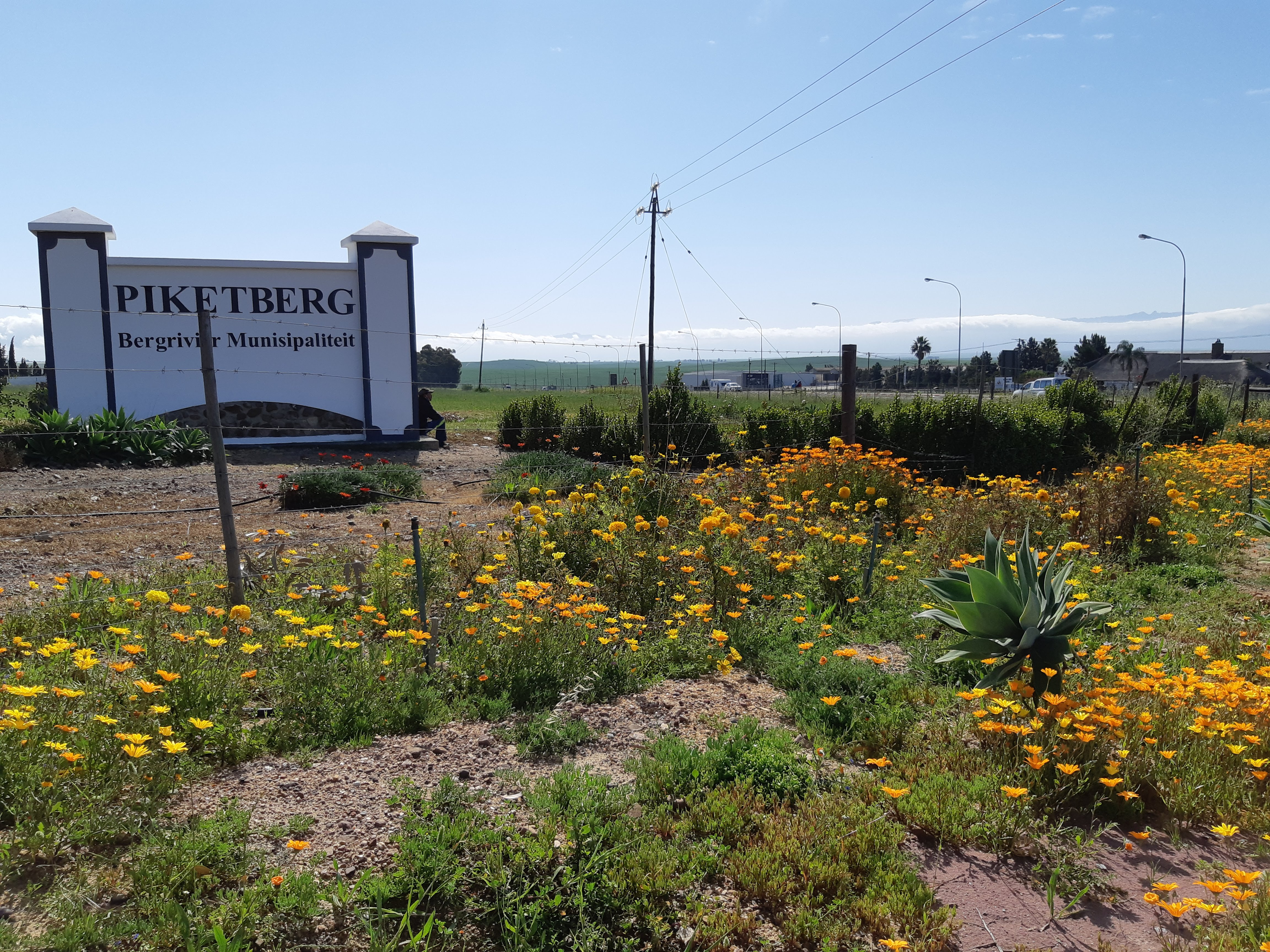
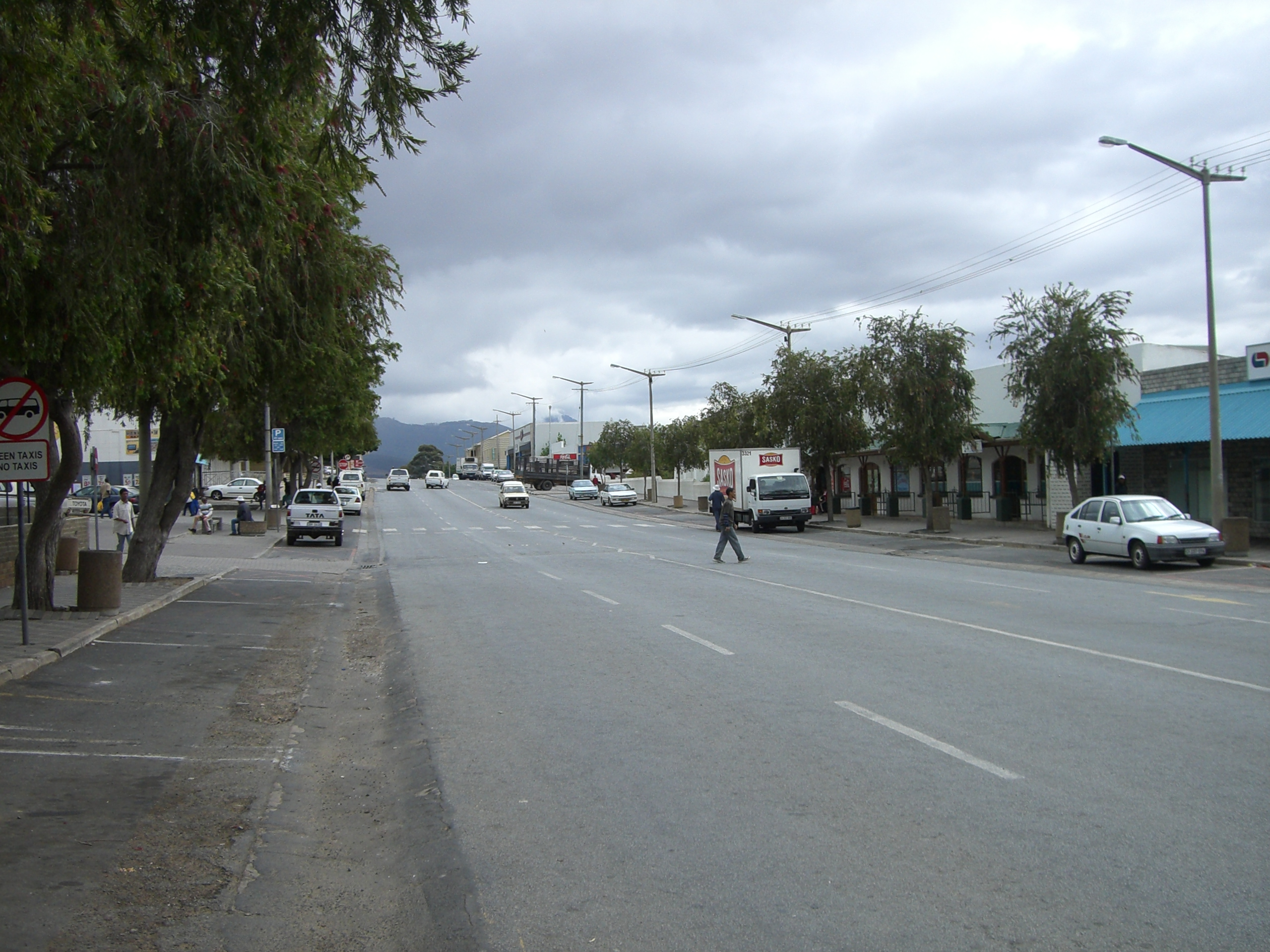
- From top, Church in Piketberg, Welcome sign to Piketberg with seasonal daisies blooming the foreground, Piketberg main road.

- Location within Western Cape Location within South Africa
- Coordinates: 32°54′16″S 18°45′26″E
- Country: South Africa
- Province: Western Cape
- District: West Coast
- Municipality: Bergrivier
- Established: 1840

Government
  - Councillors: Riaan de Vries (DA); Ray van Rooy (DA)

Area
  - Total: 13.27 km^{2} (5.12 sq mi)

Population (2011)
  - Total: 12,075
  - Density: 909.9/km^{2} (2,357/sq mi)

Racial makeup (2011)
  - Black African: 8.1%
  - Coloured: 76.4%
  - Indian/Asian: 0.5%
  - White: 14.3%
  - Other: 0.7%

First languages (2011)
  - Afrikaans: 92.7%
  - Xhosa: 1.9%
  - English: 1.8%
  - Sotho: 1.2%
  - Other: 2.4%
- Time zone: UTC+2 (SAST)
- Postal code (street): 7320
- PO box: 7320
- Area code: 022

Piketberg (also sometimes spelt Piquetberg in the past) is a town in the Western Cape, South Africa, located about 80 km east of Saldanha Bay. The original spelling of the name was "Piquetberg". The town is in the foothills of the Piketberg mountains, a range of low mountains formed from Table Mountain Sandstone.

The area around the mountains is conducive to the farming of wheat, while the area on top of the Piketberg Mountains range (called Piket-Bo-Berg), being cooler and generally frost-free, is suited to the farming of fruit and Rooibos Tea. Piketberg has a large Dutch Reformed Church designed by the architect Carl Otto Hager in his trademark neo-Gothic style.

== History ==
The area was inhabited by the Khoikhoi and the San before the arrival of 21 Dutch, Huguenot and German families in 1705-06, and there is still well-preserved San rock art in the mountains. There was once a small military post in the town to protect the livestock of farmers from raids by the Khoikhoi. By the 1730s the population had grown to 35 families and around 400 white people. The Holtzhausen, Reyneke, Joubert, van Rooyen, Niewoudt and Visagie families are among the earliest settler-pioneers of 1705-06.

The Picquet commando was established in 1711 by the Dutch United East India Company (VOC) and consisted of a squad of 15 Riflemen of the Militia and a single 80 mm field cannon for protection against depredations of natives and wild animals. The cannon-fire protected the European-descended farming community from the attacks of the indigenous groups, the "Gonjemans".

The community used its cannon to signal the arrival of ships in Cape Town. Piketberg's farmers would load their carts with produce and wares. Then head to Cape Town to do business. The cannon also fired on special occasions like Queen Victoria's birthday and the arrival of the town's first telephone line. It fired for the last time in the 1961 on the proclamation of the Republic. A misfire left the school's windows aflame. Hereafter, the cannon was filled with cement. Until recently, the Piketberg cannon stood in front of Piketberg High School, aimed East, in the direction of Porterville High School, its rival.

Jewish Heritage

Lodewyk Ando Simon, of Hungarian Jewish descent, moved from nearby Redelinghuys to Piketberg and built the synagogue in 1925. It is estimated that 30 Jewish families lived in Piketberg at this time. Rabbi Moses Beraitzer, was the first rabbi. He was a strict shepherd to his flock. Though blind in his later years, the Rabbi served undaunted, and preached the Talmud from memory. It is unsure when the congregation disbanded.

The University of Cape Town's Kaplan Centre houses several of the synagogue's historic documents. Since 1996 the synagogue has been home to the Piketberg Tourism Bureau. In recent years the synagogue has been part of the town museum. In February 2004 descendants of Piketberg's lost Jewish community celebrated their roots with a tree planting ceremony.

== Bio-scope ==
The Piketberg Bio-scope building was built in the late 1920s. It was one of the first bios in the region. During the 1970s the cinema ran performances on Wednesday, Friday, and Saturday. Bruce Lee and James Bond movies were popular. South Africa's segregation also crept into the movie theatre. Non-whites sat in the gallery and whites sat on the main seats.

== Notable people ==
- Shaun Abrahams, former national director of public prosecutions (NDPP) at the National Prosecuting Authority was born in Piketberg.
- Sheila Cussons (1922-2004), Afrikaans language writer and poet was born in Piketberg.
- Andries Treurnicht (1921-1993), Apartheid era National Party politician a former Minister of Education was born in the town.
- Colla Swart (b. 1930), noted photographer and resident of Piketberg.
- Leon Schreiber (b. 1988), South African writer and politician.
