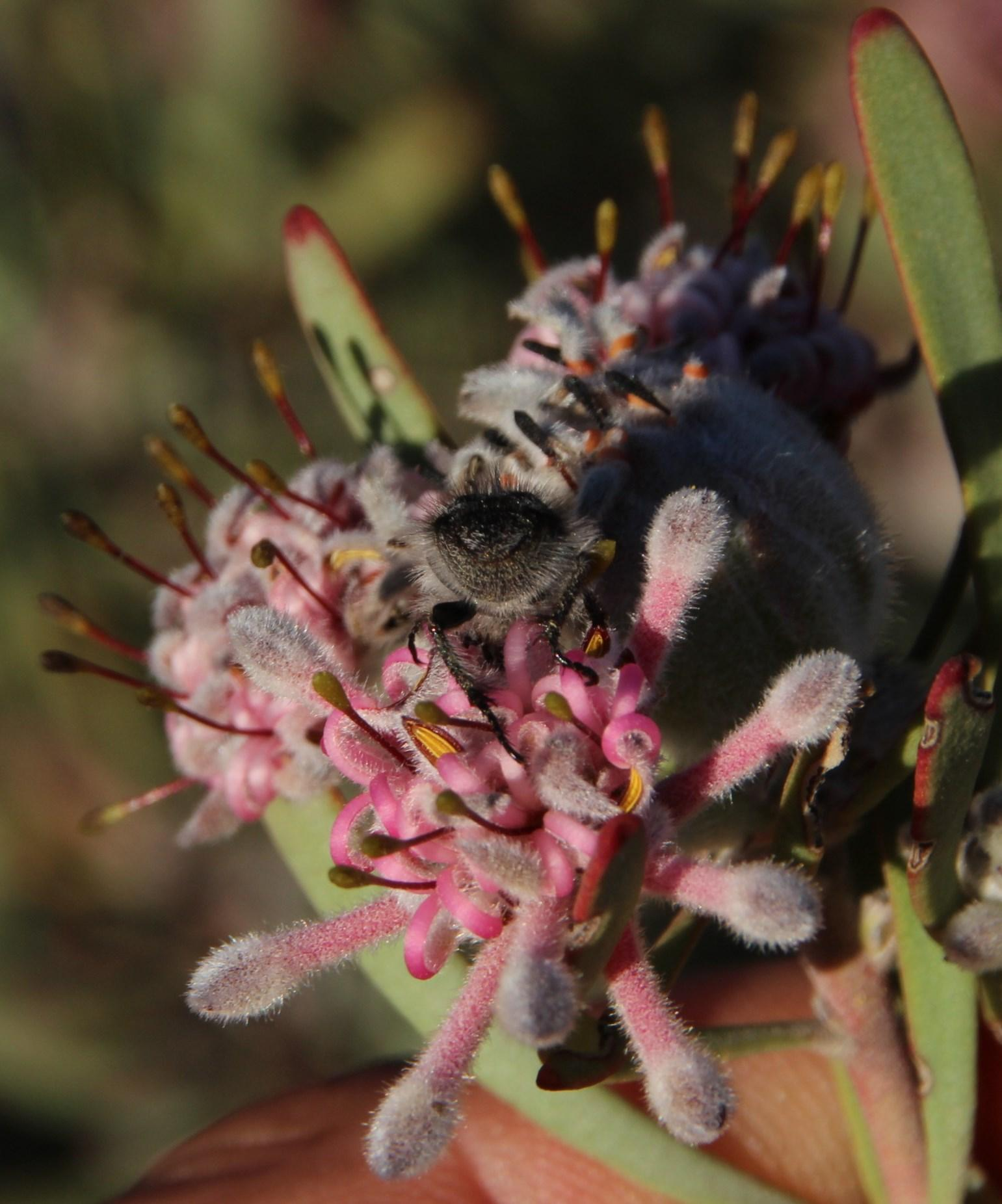
- Vexatorella obtusata subsp. albomontana. Photo: Tony Rebelo.

Conservation status
- Least Concern (IUCN 3.1)

Scientific classification
- Kingdom: Plantae
- Clade: Embryophytes
- Clade: Tracheophytes
- Clade: Angiosperms
- Clade: Eudicots
- Order: Proteales
- Family: Proteaceae
- Genus: Vexatorella
- Species: V. obtusata

Binomial name
- Vexatorella obtusata (Thunb.) Rourke

Subspecies
- V. obtusata subsp. obtusata; V. obtusata subsp. albomontana (Rourke) Rourke

Synonyms
- Protea obtusata, Leucadendron obtusatum, Leucospermum obtusatum

= Vexatorella obtusata =

Species of plant endemic to South Africa

Vexatorella obtusata is an evergreen shrub, with narrow, leathery leaves and about 2 cm big, globular flowerheads consisting of well scented, creamy pink flowers, from which a long style with a thickened tip extends. Two subspecies are distinguished, both restricted to different parts of the Western Cape province of South Africa. The creeping V. obtusata subsp. obtusata, also known as the Montagu vexator flowers from September to December, and the upright V. obtusata subsp. albomontana, also known as the Witteberg vexator, that has flowers between August and November.

== Description ==
Vexatorella obtusata subsp. obtusata is a spreading shrub of about 2 m (7 ft), that may be rising to about 20 cm (⅔ ft), while subsp. albomontana is an upright or nearly upright shrub of about 1 m (3⅓ ft) both in height and diameter, growing from a single stem. The flowering stems (trailing in the typical subspecies and upright in subsp. albomontana) are 1–2 mm (0.04–0.08 in) thick, initially with some powdery hairs that soon are lost. The leaves have an entire margin and a blunt, rounded tip, are dull greyish to bluish green, initially with some powdery hairs which soon are lost. In subsp. obtusata the leaves are upright, 1–2½ cm (0.4–1.0 in) long and ½–4½ mm (0.02–0.18 in). In subsp. albomontana, the leaves are slightly rising and overlapping along the branches, 2¼–3¾ cm (0.9–1.5 in) long and 2½–5½ mm (0.10–0.22 in) wide.

The flower heads are set at the tip of the branches, globe-shaped and 1½–2 cm (0.6–0.8 in) across. The common base of the flowers in the same head is flattened globe-shaped and 3–4 mm in diam. The involucre consists of a single whorl of cartilaginous, overlapping, pointed oval bracts of 6–8 mm (¼–⅓ in) long and 2–4 mm (0.08–0.16 in) wide, the outside of which is covered with felty to woolly hair, each with a hardened pointy to stretched tip.

The pointy, oval bracts subtending the individual flower are 5–7 mm (0.20–0.28 in) long and 2½–3 mm wide, thickly woolly, tightly encircling the foot of the flower. The 4-merous perianth is 1–1½ cm (0.4–0.6 in) long and straight. The lower part, that remains merged when the flower is open, called tube, is hairless and 2–3 mm (0.08–0.12 in) long, are somewhat flattened on the four sides. The segments in the middle part (or claws), where the perianth is split lengthwise, are cream to pink in colour, thread-shaped, all curve back towards the tube as soon as the flower opens. The segments in the upper part (or limbs), which enclosed the pollen presenter in the bud, are about 3 mm (0.12 in) long, lance-shaped and the outside surface is covered in very fine short felty hairs. The black anthers are directly merged to each of the limbs, elliptic in shape, about 2½ mm (0.1 in) long, and a pointed extension on the tip. From the centre of the perianth emerges a straight, initially yellowish-green but later deep claret-coloured style of 1–1⅓ cm (0.4–0.5 in) long. The thickened part at the tip of the style called pollen presenter is bluntly hoof-shaped 1½–2 mm (0.06–0.08 in) long, initially greenish and turning amber with age. On the very tip is a minute pore that functions as the stigma. The downy hairy ovary is egg-shaped, about 1 mm (0.04 in) long and well differentiated from the style. The ovary is subtended by fout awl-shaped, opaque scales of about 1 mm long.

=== Differences between the subspecies ===
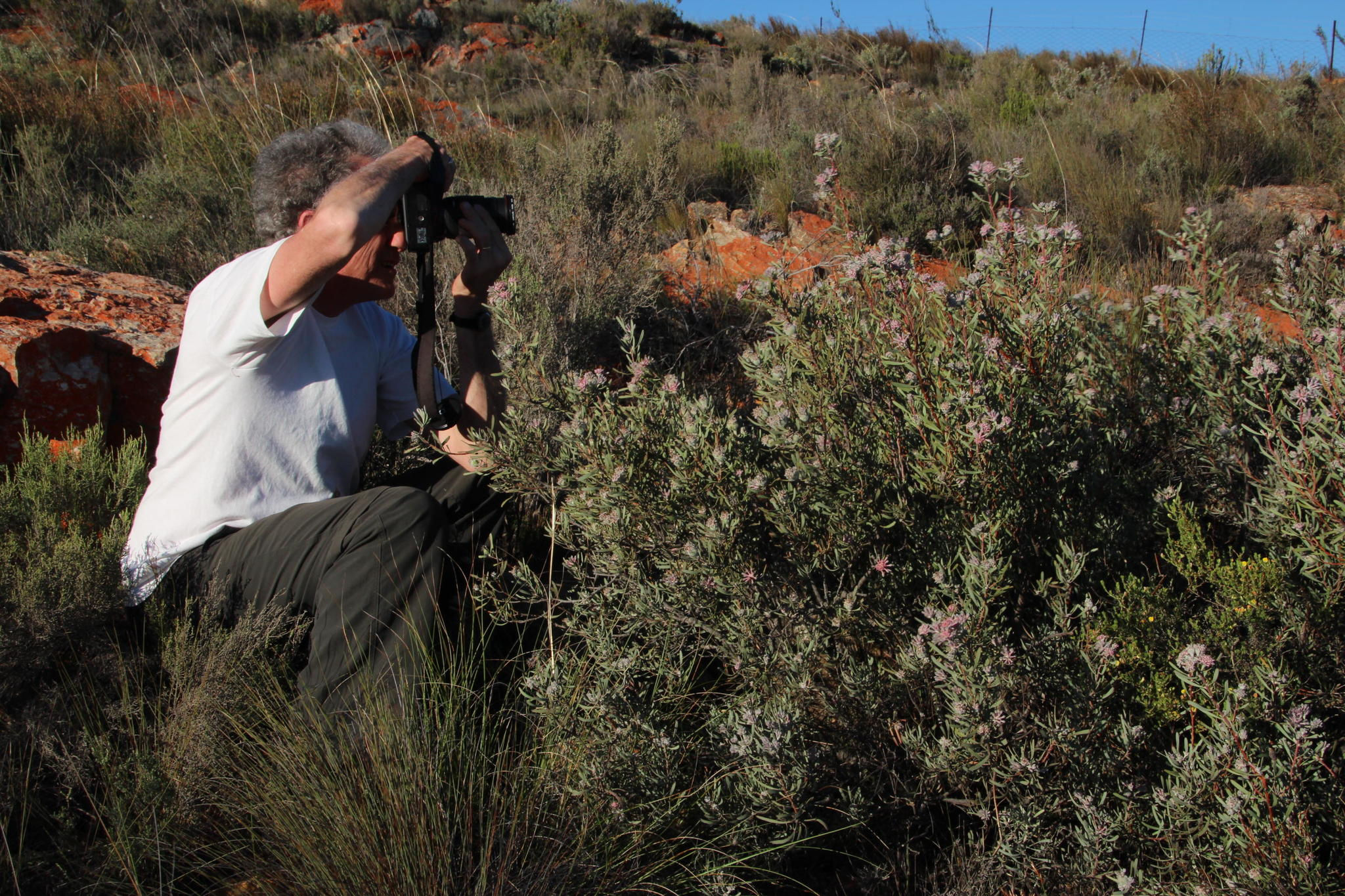
Habit of the Witteberg vexator

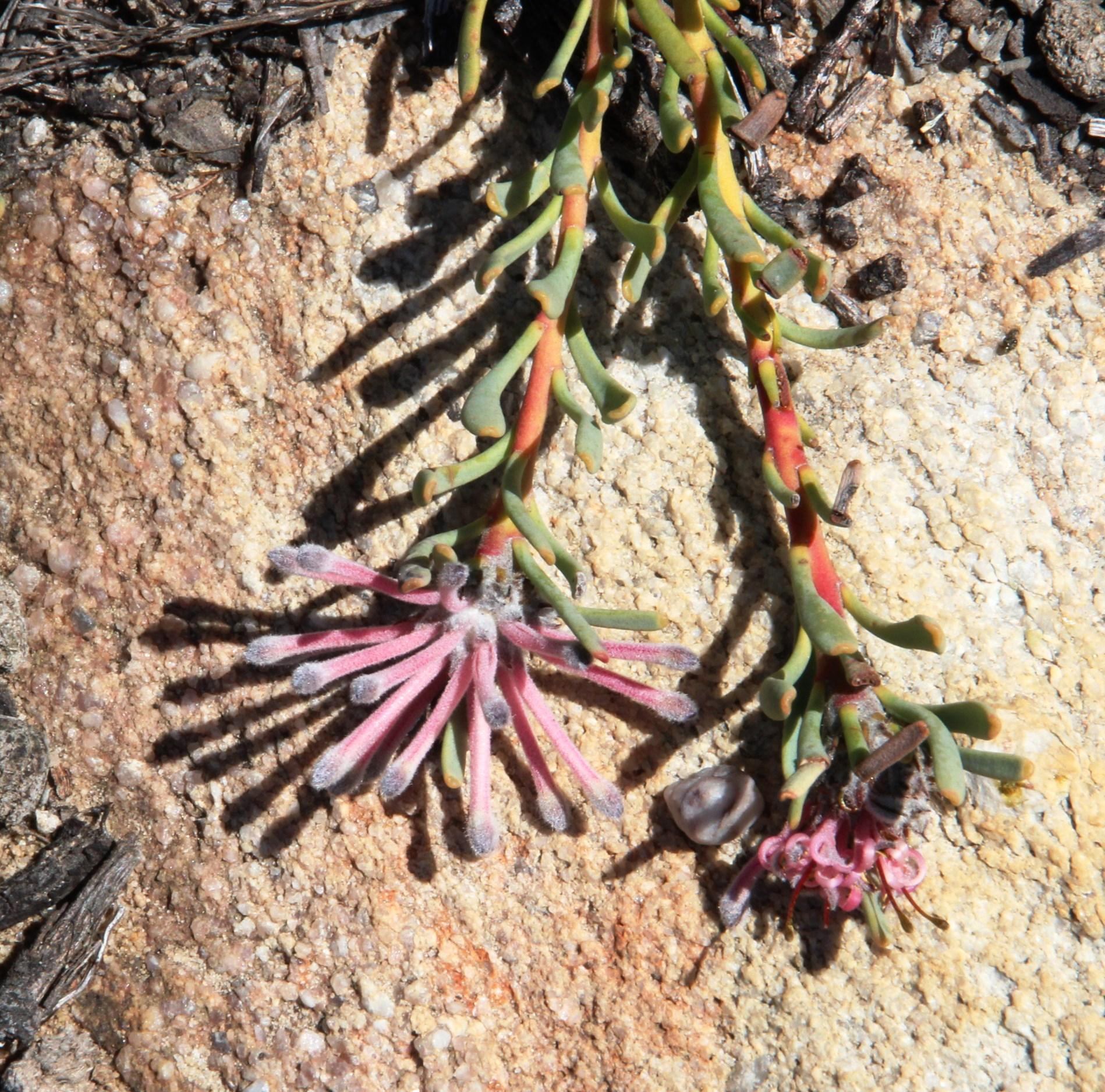
Habit of the Montagu vexator

The subspecies obtusata is a shrub lying along the ground, with the tips curving upwards, that forms dense mats of at most 20 cm (7.9 in) high and 1–2 m (3.3–6.6 ft) across. The flowering stems carry stiff, linear-spathulate leaves of 1–2½ cm long and ½–4½ mm wide, more or less oriented upwards. Subspecies albomontana is an upright or rather spreading shrub, of both up to 1 m high and wide developing from a single stem at its base. The flowering stems carry loosely ascending, overlapping, entire, hairless, linear-spathulate leaves of 2¼–3¾ cm long and 2½–5½ mm wide.

=== Differences with related species ===
Vexatorella obtusata is a prostrate or upright shrub of up to 1 m high and has linear or somewhat spoon-shaped leaves of 9–45 mm long and up to 5 mm wide, with flower heads at the tip of the branches and a single whorl of involucral bracts. V. alpina is an upright shrub of up to 1½ m high with groups of two to six heads at the tip of the branches, each subtended by a single row of bracts forming an inconspicuous involucre, and long inverted oval to elliptic leaves of 30–45 mm long and 5–13 mm wide, which is an endemic of the Kamiesberg. V. amoena has flower heads each subtended by three or four whorls of bracts that form a conspicuous involucre, shorter oval to elliptic leaves of 15–30 mm long, which grows at the south end of the Kouebokkeveld Mountains and the adjacent Swartruggens range. V. latebrosa has solitary flower heads, each containing as much as forty to fifty flowers, line- to somewhat spoon-shaped leaves, and is an endemic of the Langeberg near Robertson. Like all Vexatorella species, Leucospermum secundifolium also has bracteoles that become woody and its leaves are stalked, but its flower heads are not at the tip of the branches, and grows on the southern slopes of the Klein Swartberg mountains.

== Taxonomy ==
As far as we know Carl Thunberg was the first who collected the Montagu vexator, presumably in 1774, he described it and named it Protea obtusata in 1803. In 1856, Carl Meissner, who contributed a section on the Proteaceae in 1856 to the series Prodromus Systematis Naturalis Regni Vegetabilis by Alphonse Pyramus de Candolle, reassigned this species to the genus Leucadendron making the new combination Leucadendron obtusatum. Edwin Percy Phillips thought the Montague vexator should be placed in the genus Leucospermum making the new combination Leucospermum obtusatum. The Witteberg vexator was first recognised as a separate taxon by John Patrick Rourke, who regarded it as a subspecies and named it Leucospermum obtusatum subsp. albomontanum in 1970. When he erected the new genus Vexatorella in 1984, he reassigned both subspecies, creating the new combinations V. obtusata subsp. obtusata and V. obtusata subsp. albomontana.

== Distribution, habitat and ecology ==
Plants of both subspecies are killed by fire. The flowers are pollinated by insects. About two months after flowering, the fruits fall to the ground, where these are collected by native ants. These carry the fruit to their nests, where the seeds remain underground until germination is triggered by fire followed by rain.

=== Montagu vexator ===
The Montagu vexator has its main distribution around the Koo mountains and Waboomsberg near Montagu, but it ranges westwards all the way to Bokkerivier, Matroosberg and Keeromsberg near Worcester. It grows on dry rocky slopes consisting of Table Mountain Sandstone, mostly above 900 m (3000 ft) altitude. The average annual precipitation in this area is 250–380 mm (10–15 in) mostly falling during the winter. Other species that dominate the local arid fynbos are several low Restionaceae, Cliffortia ruscifolia, Protea repens, P. lorifolia and P. sulphurea.

=== Witteberg vexator ===
The Witteberg vexator can be found along the length of the Witteberg and the adjacent Bonteberg. This subspecies only grows between cracks in Witteberg quartzite. It is most common along the ridge and on the higher southern slopes, but even extends down sheltered cloughs on the hot northern side, at an altitude of 1200–1500 m (4000–5000 ft). It grows in an open vegetation that further is dominated by low Restionaceae growing in scattered tufts, Erica spectabilis, Protea lorifolia, P. harmeri and Leucadendron cadens. The average annual precipitation is probably below 250 mm (10 in).

== Conservation ==
The Montagu vexator and the Witteberg vexator are both regarded as a species of least concern because both have a stable population.
