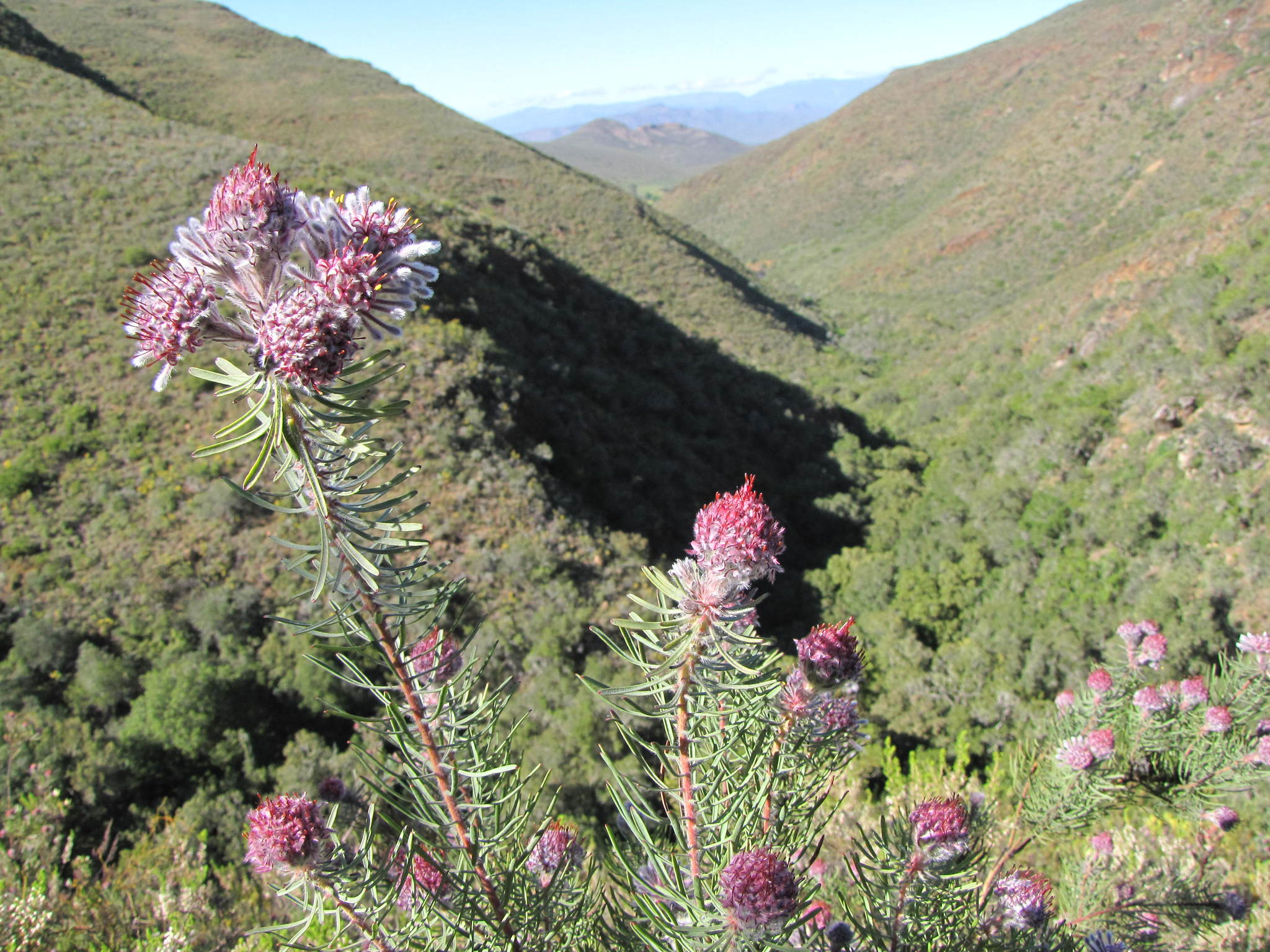
- photo: Nick Helme

Conservation status
- Least Concern (IUCN 3.1)

Scientific classification
- Kingdom: Plantae
- Clade: Embryophytes
- Clade: Tracheophytes
- Clade: Angiosperms
- Clade: Eudicots
- Order: Proteales
- Family: Proteaceae
- Genus: Vexatorella
- Species: V. latebrosa

Binomial name
- Vexatorella latebrosa Rourke, 1984

= Vexatorella latebrosa =

Species of plant endemic to South Africa

Vexatorella latebrosa, also known as the Robertson vexator, is an evergreen, upright shrub of up to about 1.5 m (4 ft 11 in) high, from the family Proteaceae. It has entire, long inverted egg-shaped, bluish grey, leathery leaves that are line-shaped to very narrowly spade-shaped in outline, 5–6 cm (2.0–2.4 in) long and 2–3 mm (0.079–0.118 in), and mostly solitary globular flower heads at the end of the branches of 2.5–3 cm (0.98–1.18 in) across with scented, pink to carmine flowers with extended, styles with a thickened tip. The plants are flowering from August to September. It is an endemic species that is restricted to the Western Cape province of South Africa.

== Description ==
Vexatorella latebrosa is an evergreen, upright shrub of up to about 1–2 m (3 ft 3 in – 6 ft 7 in) high that forms a rounded crown with branches at approximately right angles, which develops from a single main stem at the foot that may reach a thickness of 2–3.5 cm (0.79–1.38 in). The flowering stems are about 2–5 mm (0.08–0.20 in) thick, initially covered with very fine down, which is soon lost. The leathery leaves are gully-shaped in cross-section, line-shaped to very narrowly spade-shaped in outline, 5–6.5 cm (2.0–2.6 in) long and 2–3 mm (0.08–0.12 in) wide, tapering at the base, have a thickened, reddish, blunt tip, and an entire margin. They are set alternately at a distinct angle to the branch.

The flower heads set individually at the tip of the branches, but may get overtopped later. They are globe-shaped and 2.5–3 cm (0.98–1.18 in) across, and seated or on a stalk of up to 1 cm (0.4 in) long. The common base of the flowers in the same head is flattened egg- to globe-shaped, about 6–8 mm (0.24–0.32 in) across. The involucre consists of two to three lose whorls of pointy, lance-shaped bracts of 8–10 mm (0.32–0.40 in) long and 2–3 mm (0.08–0.12 in) wide, that are covered with thick woolly hairs. Each head typically consists of 40–50 flowers.

The bracts subtending the individual flower (called bracteoles) are inverted lance-shaped with a pointy or pointed tip, about 6–8 mm (0.24–0.32 in) long and 2–3 mm (0.08–0.12 in) wide, very densely woolly, except for the tip, tightly enveloping the base of the flower. If a fruit develops, this bracteole grows and becomes woody. The star-symmetrical 4-merous perianth is 1.5–1.75 cm (0.59–0.69 in) long, straight when still in the bud. The lower part, that remains merged when the flower is open, called tube, is quadrangular in cross section, hairless and 3–4 mm (0.12–0.16 in) long. The segments in the middle part (or claws), where the perianth is split lengthwise, are densely felty, carmine in colour, slender, and coil back as soon as the flower opens. The segments in the upper part (or limbs), which enclosed the pollen presenter in the bud, are boat-shaped in cross section, very narrowly lance-shaped with a pointy tip in outline, about 3 mm (0.12 in) long, and covered rough felty hairs. The anthers are narrowly lance-shaped to linear, with the connecting tissue black and lengthened at the tip. Each one is directly merged with one of the limbs.

From the centre of the perianth emerges a straight, hairless, carmine-coloured style of 1½–1¾ cm (0.60–0.72 in) long, that does not grow after the flower opens and has a conspicuous bulge at its base. The thickened part at the tip of the style called pollen presenter is clearly hoof-shaped, about 2 mm (0.08 in) long, with a slight ring-like thickening where it merges with the style. The groove that functions as the stigma sits across the very tip of the pollen presenter. The powdery hairy ovary is oval to flask-shaped, about 3 mm (0.12 in) long. The ovary is subtended by four, opaque, thread- to awl-shaped scales of about 2 mm long. The fruit is oval, one-seeded, powdery hairy or hairless, 8–10 mm (0.32–0.40 in) long and about 4 mm wide, with a beak at the top end and blunt and wrinkled at its base.

=== Differences with related species ===
V. latebrosa has solitary flower heads, at 2.5–3 cm (0.98–1.18 in) across, the largest of the genus, each containing as much as forty to fifty flowers, line- to somewhat spoon-shaped leaves, and is an endemic of the Langeberg near Robertson. V. alpina is an upright shrub of up to 1.5 m (4 ft 11 in) high with groups of two to six heads at the tip of the branches, each subtended by a single row of bracts forming an inconspicuous involucre, and long inverted oval to elliptic leaves of 30–45 mm long and 5–13 mm wide, which is an endemic of the Kamiesberge. V. amoena has solitary flower heads each subtended by three or four whorls of bracts that form a conspicuous involucre, shorter oval to elliptic leaves of 15–30 mm long, which grows at the south end of the Kouebokkeveld Mountains and the adjacent Swartruggens range. V. obtusata has linear or somewhat spoon-shaped leaves of 9–45 mm long. Its subspecies obtusata is a prostrate shrub that can only be found in the Montagu and Worcester districts, while subspecies albomontana is an upright shrub from around the Perdekloof Pass. Leucospermum secundifolium also has bracteoles that become woody, but its leaves are stalked and its flower heads are not at the tip of the branches, and grows on the southern slopes of the Klein Swartberg mountains.

== Taxonomy ==
As far as known, the Robertson vexator was first collected for science by a mrs. Esterhuysen in 1954. In 1984 John Patrick Rourke described the species and named it Vexatorella latebrosa.

== Distribution, habitat and ecology ==
Vexatorella latebrosa can only be found on the south and southwestern slopes of the Langeberg near Klaasvoogds in the neighbourhood of Robertson. The species grows here on a heavy reddish clay that derives from Malmesbury Shale at an altitude of 400–900 m (1300–2950 ft) in vegetation types called Breede Shale Fynbos and renosterveld. The Robertson vexator does not survive fire. It is pollinated by insects. About two months after flowering the fruits fall to the ground, where these are collected by native ants that carry them to their nests. Here, the seeds remain protected underground, until an overhead fire and subsequent rains trigger germination.

== Conservation ==
The Robertson vexator is considered critically endangered, because it has a limited distribution area of only 1 km^{2} (0.39 sq mi), and such a small population would be severely threatened by too frequent fire.
