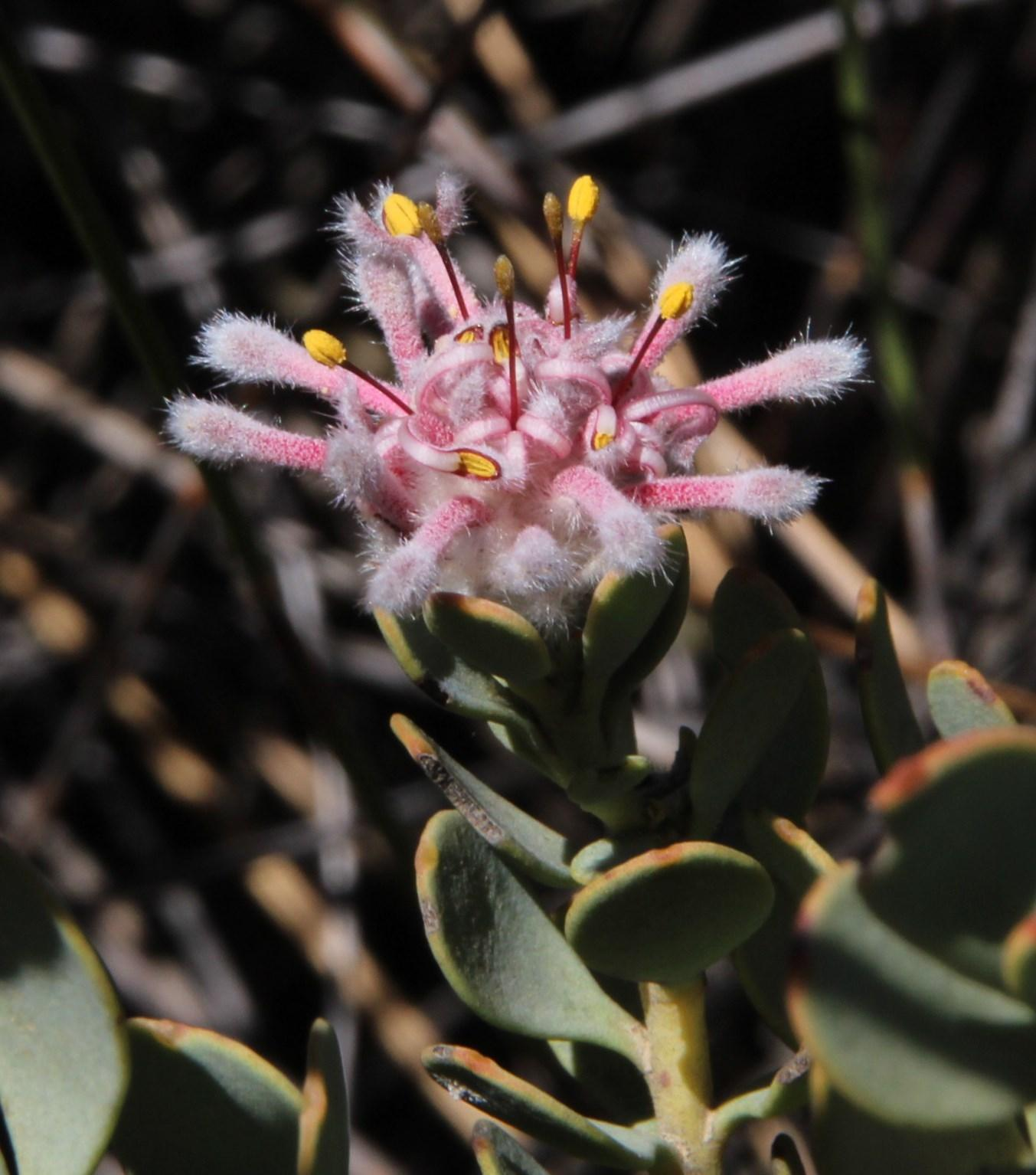
- photo: Tony Rebelo

Conservation status
- Least Concern (IUCN 3.1)

Scientific classification
- Kingdom: Plantae
- Clade: Embryophytes
- Clade: Tracheophytes
- Clade: Angiosperms
- Clade: Eudicots
- Order: Proteales
- Family: Proteaceae
- Genus: Vexatorella
- Species: V. amoena

Binomial name
- Vexatorella amoena (Rourke) Rourke, 1984

Synonyms
- Leucospermum alpinum subsp. amoenum

= Vexatorella amoena =

Species of plant endemic to South Africa

Vexatorella amoena, also known as the Swartruggens vexator, is an evergreen shrub of up to about 1 m (3 ft) high, that is assigned to the family Proteaceae. It has entire, inverted egg-shaped, bluish grey, leathery leaves of 1½–3 cm (0.6–1.2 in) long and 5–11 mm (0.20–0.45 in) wide on a distinct stalk, and globular flower heads of about 2 cm (0.8 in) across with pale pink flowers with extended, thick-tipped styles at the tip of the branches. The plants are flowering from September to November. It is an endemic species that is restricted to the Western Cape province of South Africa.

== Description ==
Vexatorella amoena is an evergreen, shrub of up to about 1 m (3 ft) high, which develops from a single main stem at the foot that may reach a thickness of 5 cm (2 in). The lowest branches tend to spread along the ground and raise their tips. The flowering stems are also upright or slightly spreading cylinder-shaped and about 3 mm (0.12 in) thick, initially covered with very fine down, which is soon lost. The hairless, bluish grey, leathery leaves are inverted egg-shaped to spade-shaped, 1½–3 cm (0.6–1.2 in) long and 5–11 mm (0.2–0.45 in) wide, have a thickened, rounded tip, a prominent, entire margin, and are set on a distinct stalk. They are set alternately, slightly overlapping to at a distinct angle to the branch.

The flower heads are grouped with two to six at the tip of the branches, but may get overtopped later. They are globe-shaped and about 2 cm (0.8 in) across, on a stalk of up to 1½ cm long. The common base of the flowers in the same head is egg- to globe-shaped, about ½ cm (0.2 in) across. The conspicuous involucre consists of three or four whorls of lance-shaped bracts of about 6 mm (¼ in) long and 1½ mm (0.06 in) wide, that are covered with thickly woolly hair, each with a hardened pointy to stretched tip.

The very densely woolly, pointy bracts subtending the individual flower are oval to lance-shaped, about 5 mm (0.20 in) long and 2 mm (0.08 in) wide. The 4-merous perianth is 1⅓–1¾ cm (½–⅔ in) long, straight when still in the bud, pale pink in colour but deep claret near the top. The lower part, that remains merged when the flower is open, called tube, is hairless and 2–2½ mm (0.08–0.10 in) long. The middle part (or claws), where the perianth is split lengthwise, spread at right angles, are all the same length, shaggy to densely shaggy hairy, and coil back as soon as the flower opens. The upper part (or limbs), which enclosed the pollen presenter in the bud, and is ellipse-shaped, about 2 mm (0.08 in) long, and covered with shaggy to short, dense, matted hairs. From the centre of the perianth emerges a straight, initially pale pink to carmine, later deep claret coloured style of 1¼–1¾ cm (½–⅔ in) long. The thickened part at the tip of the style called pollen presenter is hoof-shaped, about 1½ mm (0.06 in) long, at first brownish, later blackish to deep purple. The downy hairy ovary is ellipsoid to egg-shaped, about 1 mm (0.04 in) long, and clearly distinguished from the style. The ovary is subtended by four yellow, awl-shaped scales of about 1 mm long.

=== Differences with related species ===
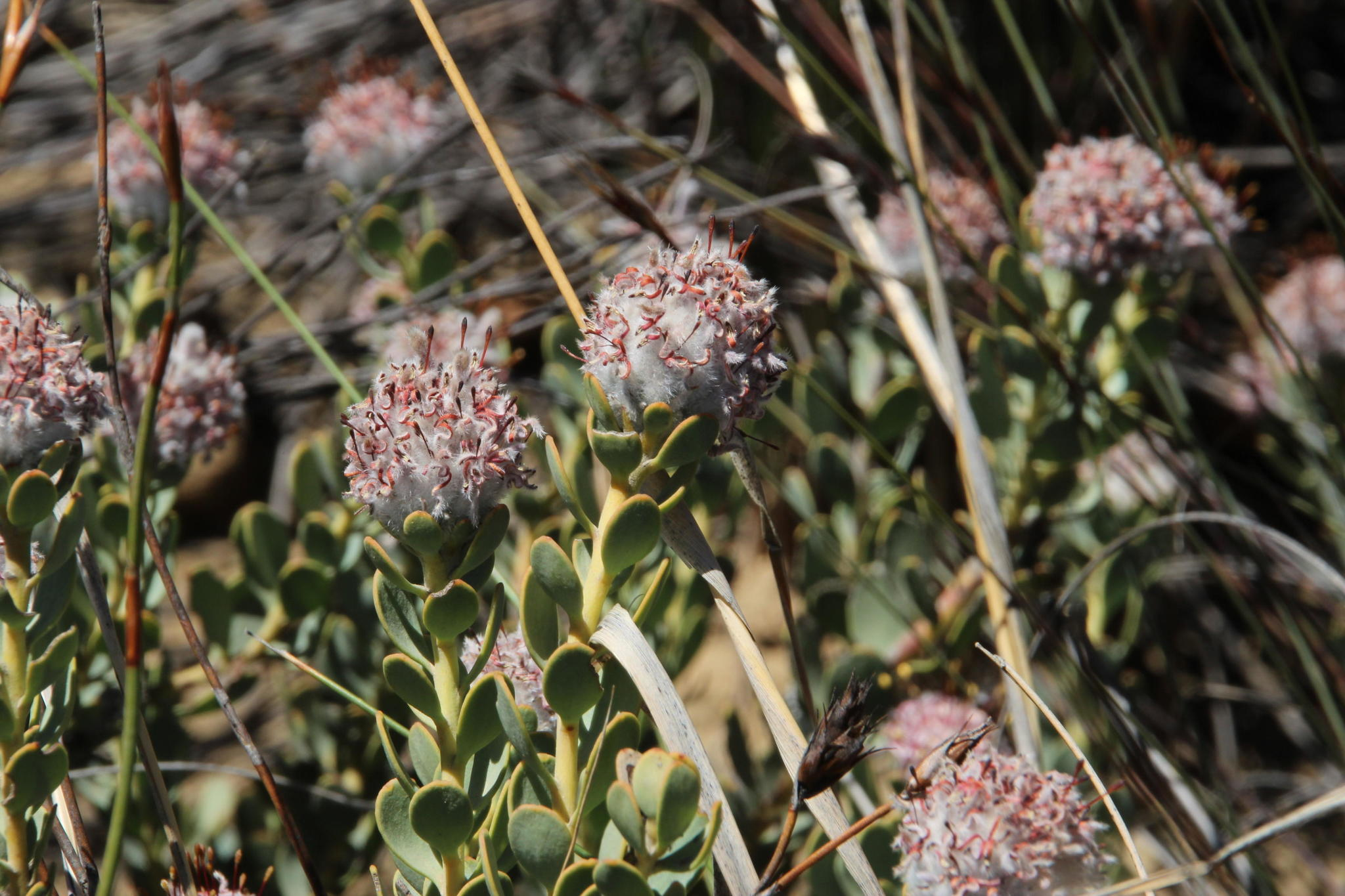
Some flowering stems starting fruit development

Vexatorella amoena is a shrub of 1 m high with trailing lower branches, flower heads each subtended by three or four whorls of very woolly bracts that form a conspicuous involucre, shorter oval to elliptic leaves 15–30 mm long, which grows at the south end of the Kouebokkeveld Mountains the adjacent Swartruggens range. V. alpina is an upright shrub of up to 1½ m high with groups of two to six heads at the tip of the branches, each subtended by a single row of bracts forming an inconspicuous involucre, and long inverted oval to elliptic leaves of 30–45 mm long, 5–13 mm wide, which is an endemic of the Kamiesberg. V. latebrosa has solitary flower heads, each containing as much as forty to fifty flowers, line- to somewhat spoon-shaped leaves, and is an endemic of the Langeberg near Robertson. V. obtusata has linear or somewhat spoon-shaped of 9–45 mm long. Its subspecies obtusata is a prostrate shrub that can only be found in the Montagu and Worcester districts, while subspecies albomontana is an upright shrub from around the Perdekloof Pass. Leucospermum secundifolium also has bracteoles that become woody, but its leaves are stalked and its flower heads are not at the tip of the branches, and grows on the southern slopes of the Klein Swartberg mountains.

== Taxonomy ==
In 1970, John Patrick Rourke distinguished the form in the Swartruggens Mountains from that of the Kamiesberge as a subspecies and named Leucospermum alpinum subsp. amoenum. In 1984 however, Rourke reassigned most taxa in the section Xericola to his newly erected genus Vexatorella, and raised the Swartruggens vexator to the rank of species and created the new combination Vexatorella amoena.

== Distribution, habitat and ecology ==
Vexatorella amoena occurs in the south of the Kouebokkeveld Mountains and Swartruggens Mountains. It can exclusively be found on weathered Table Mountain Sandstone. At slightly more moist circumstances than its relative from the Kamiesberge, it is exposed to an average annual precipitation of 250–500 mm (10–20 in). It prefers dry, hot, rocky, north-facing slopes, in so-called arid fynbos, a low and open vegetation composed mainly of few Restionaceae, Erica species and other Proteaceae.

The Swartruggens vexator is pollinated by insects. Its fruits are ripe about two months after flowering, when they fall to the ground. Here they are collected by native ants, who carry them to their nest. They then remain underground until a fire and subsequent rains trigger the seeds to germinate.

== Conservation ==
The Swartruggens vexator is considered a species of least concern, due to its stable population.
