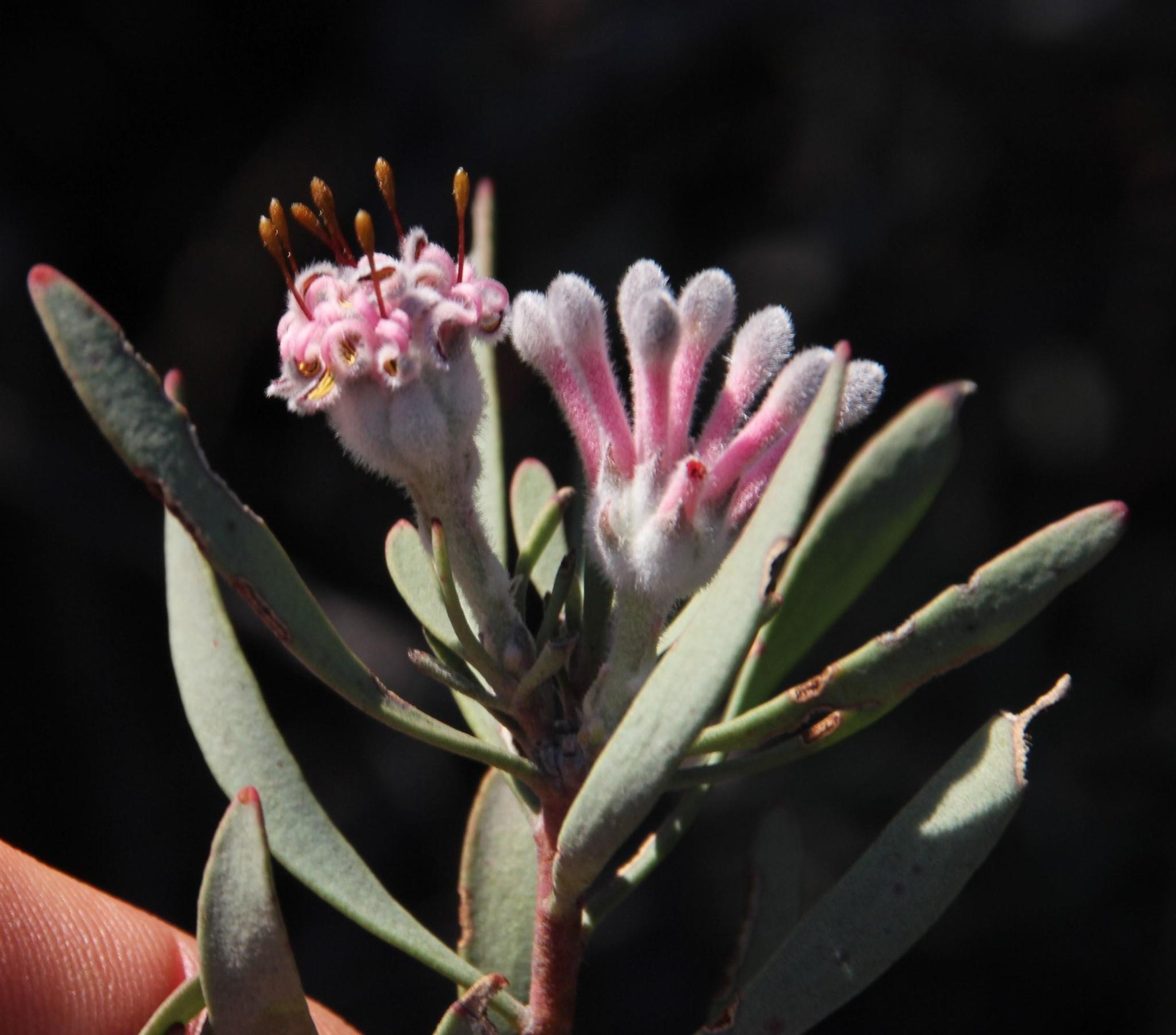

Conservation status
- Least Concern (IUCN 3.1)

Scientific classification
- Kingdom: Plantae
- Clade: Tracheophytes
- Clade: Angiosperms
- Clade: Eudicots
- Order: Proteales
- Family: Proteaceae
- Genus: Vexatorella
- Species: V. obtusata
- Subspecies: V. o. subsp. albomontana

Trinomial name
- Vexatorella obtusata subsp. albomontana (Rourke) Rourke

Synonyms
- Leucospermum obtusatum subsp. albomontanum Rourke

= Vexatorella obtusata subsp. albomontana =

Subspecies of flowering plant

Vexatorella obtusata subsp. albomontana, the Witteberg vexator, is a flower- bearing shrub that belongs to the genus Vexatorella and forms part of the fynbos. The plant is native to the Western Cape and occurs in the Witteberg, Bonteberg and Anysberg. The shrub is erect and grows to 1.0 m in length. The shrub blooms from August to November.

Fire destroys the plant but the seeds survive. Two months after flowering, the fruit falls off and ants disperse the seeds. They store the seeds in their nests. The plant is unisexual. Pollination takes place through the action of insects . The plant grows in quartzite soil at altitudes of 1000-1500 m.

== Gallery ==
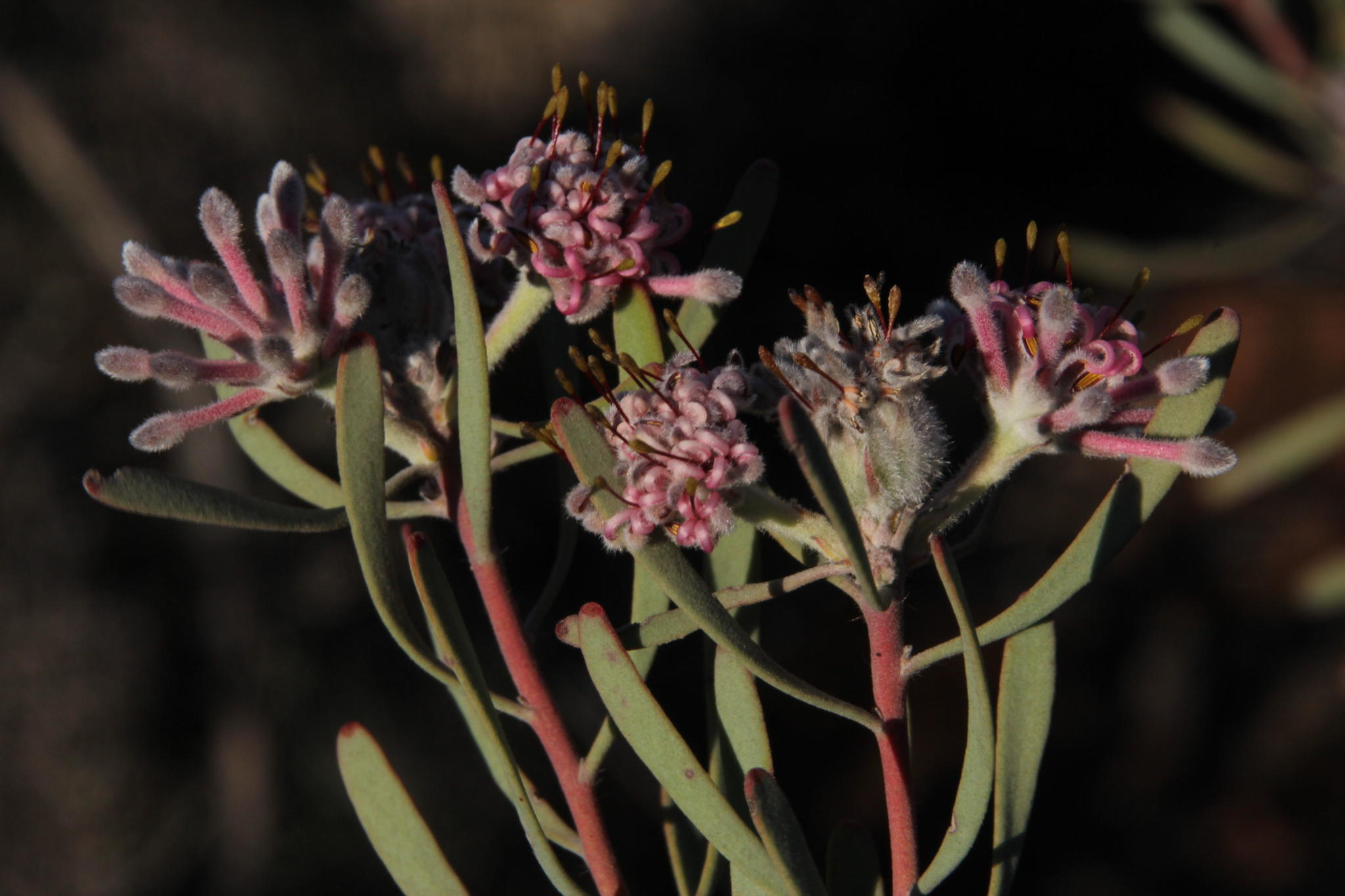

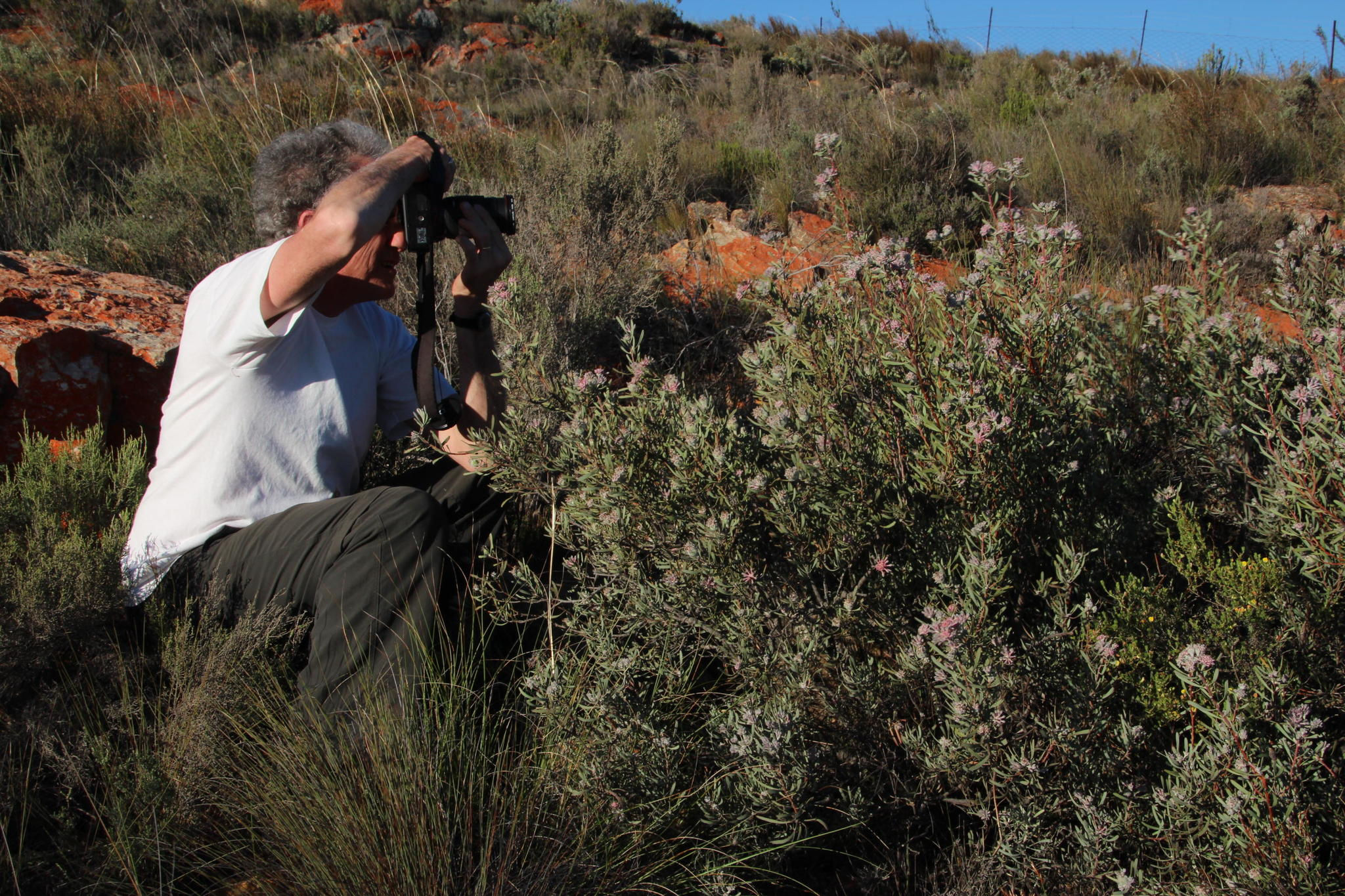
