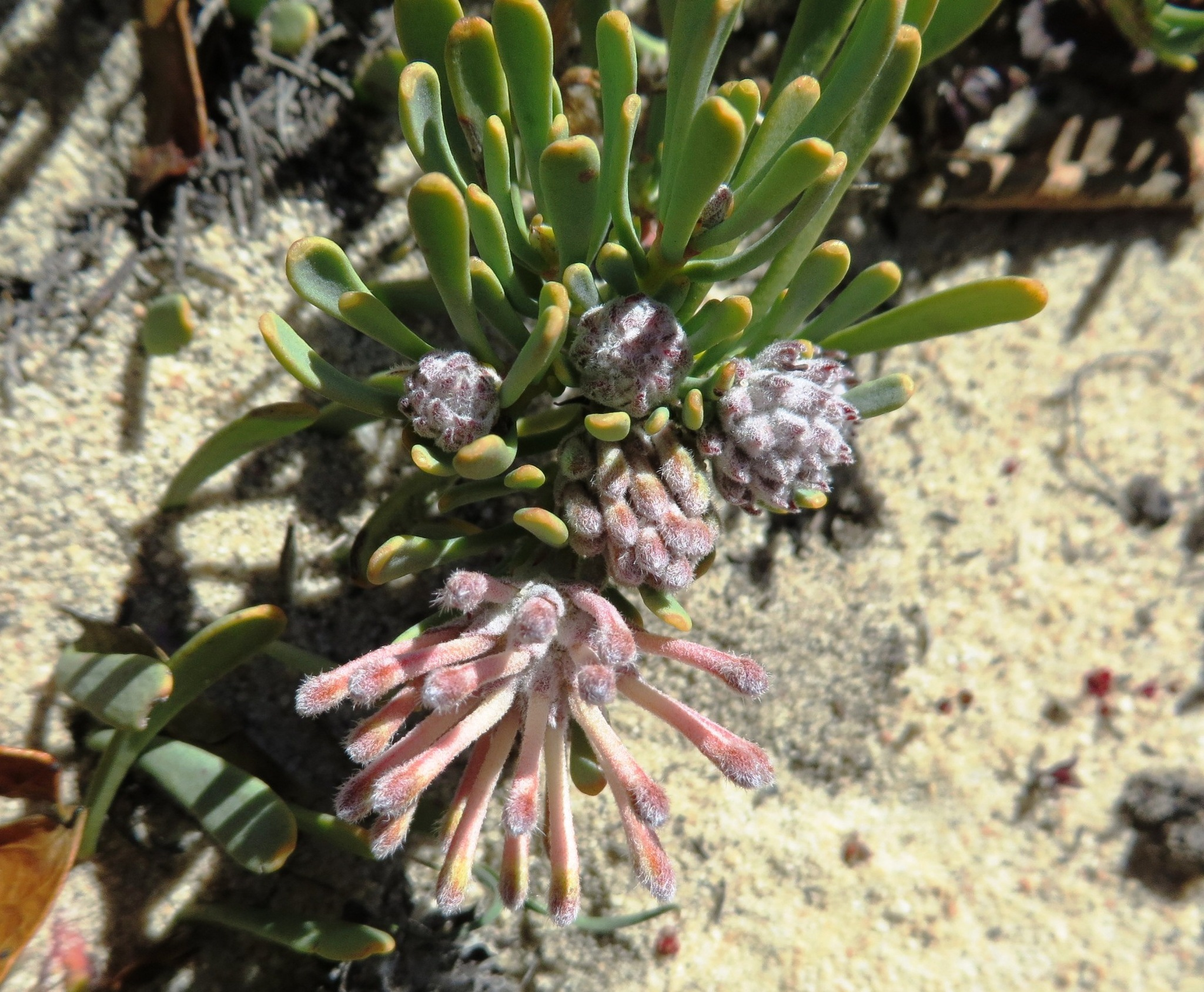

Conservation status
- Least Concern (IUCN 3.1)

Scientific classification
- Kingdom: Plantae
- Clade: Embryophytes
- Clade: Tracheophytes
- Clade: Angiosperms
- Clade: Eudicots
- Order: Proteales
- Family: Proteaceae
- Genus: Vexatorella
- Species: V. obtusata
- Subspecies: V. o. subsp. obtusata

Trinomial name
- Vexatorella obtusata subsp. obtusata (Thunb.) Rourke

Synonyms
- Leucospermum obtusatum E.Phillips

= Vexatorella obtusata subsp. obtusata =

Subspecies of flowering plant

Vexatorella obtusata subsp. obtusata, the Montagu Vexator, is a flower-bearing shrub that belongs to the genus Vexatorella and forms part of the fynbos. The plant is native to the Western Cape and occurs in the Hex River Mountains, Bokker River Mountains, Keeromsberg and Kwadouw Mountains to the Langeberg at Koo as well as the Waboomsberg. The shrub is dense and grows to 2.0 m in diameter. The shrub blooms from September to December.

Fire destroys the plant but the seeds survive. Two months after flowering, the fruit falls off and ants disperse the seeds. They store the seeds in their nests. The plant is unisexual. Pollination takes place through the action of insects. The plant grows in dry fynbos in sandstone soil at altitudes of 300-1800 m.

== Gallery ==
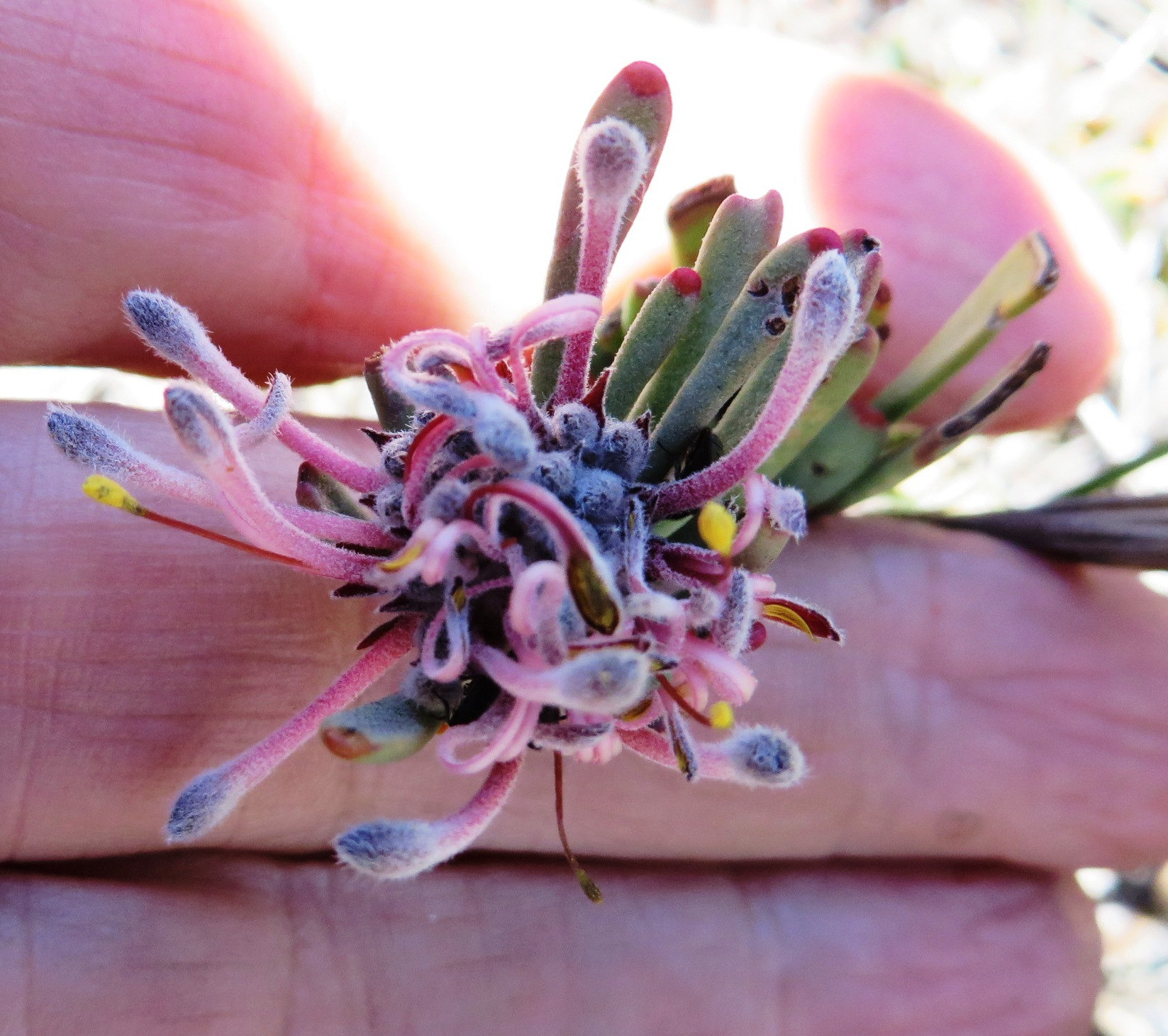

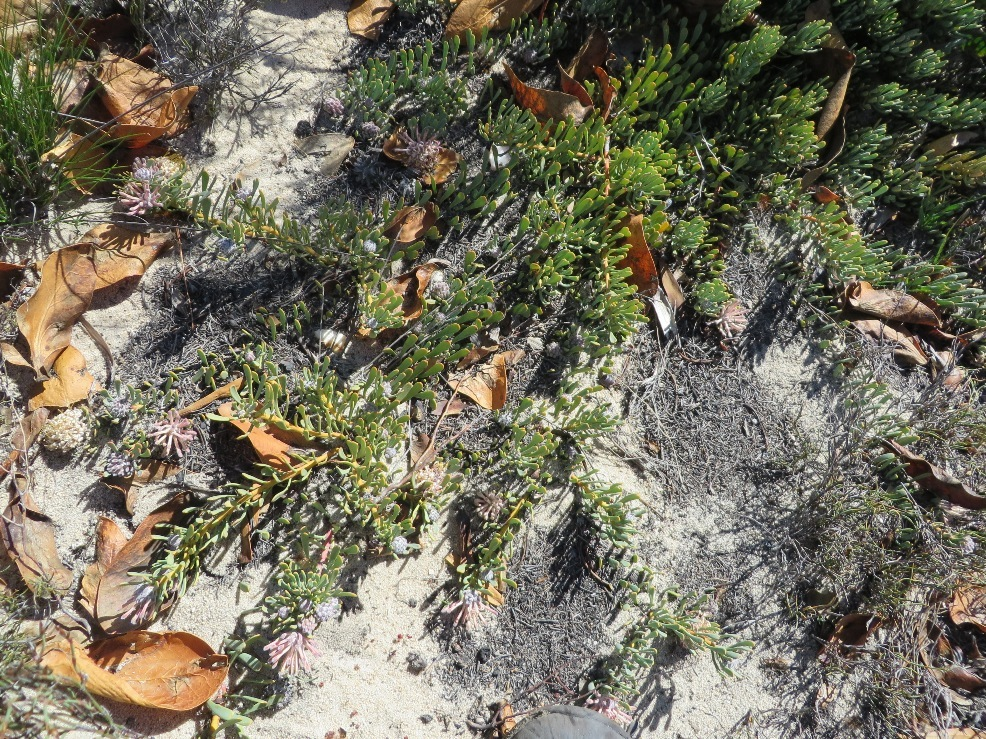
