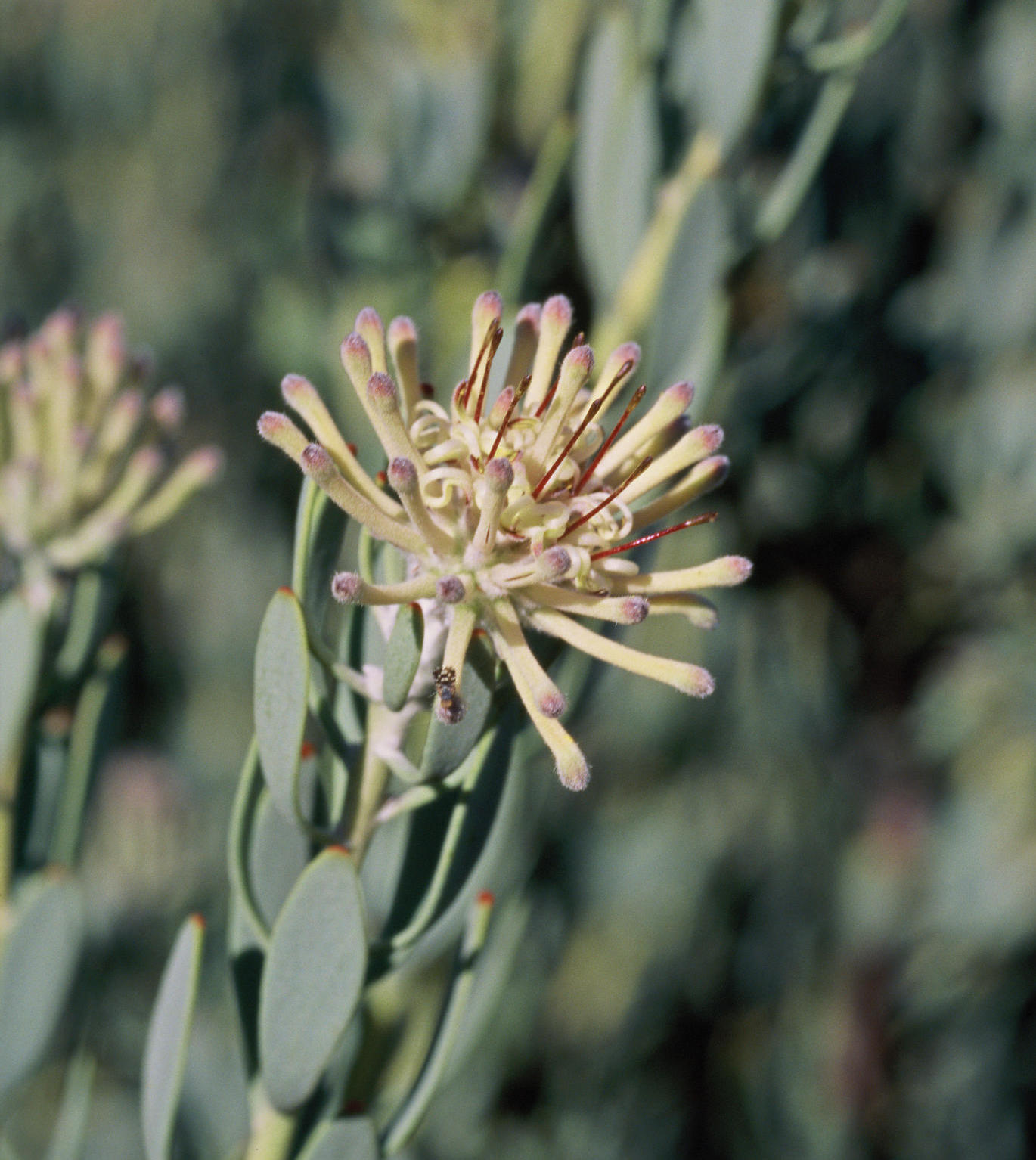

Conservation status
- Vulnerable (IUCN 3.1)

Scientific classification
- Kingdom: Plantae
- Clade: Embryophytes
- Clade: Tracheophytes
- Clade: Angiosperms
- Clade: Eudicots
- Order: Proteales
- Family: Proteaceae
- Genus: Vexatorella
- Species: V. alpina

Binomial name
- Vexatorella alpina (Salisb. ex Knight) Rourke, 1984

Synonyms
- Protea alpina; Leucospermum alpinum subsp. alpinum; Leucadendron cartilagineum; Protea cartilaginea; Leucospermum cartilagineum

= Vexatorella alpina =

Species of plant endemic to South Africa

Vexatorella alpina, the Kamiesberg vexator, is an evergreen, upright shrub of up to about 1½ m high, in the family Proteaceae. It has entire, long inverted egg-shaped, bluish grey, leathery leaves of 3–4½ cm (1.2–1.8 in) long and 5–13 mm (0.2–0.5 in) wide on a distinct stalk, and globular flower heads of about 2 cm (0.8 in) across at the tip of the branches, and consisting of pale pink flowers with extended, thick-tipped styles. The plants are flowering from September to November. It is an endemic species that is restricted to the Kamiesberge in South Africa.

== Description ==
Vexatorella alpina is an evergreen, upright shrub of up to about 1½ m high, which develops from a single main stem at the foot that may reach a thickness of 5 cm (2 in). The lowest branches tend to spread along the ground and raise their tips. The flowering stems are also upright or slightly spreading cylinder-shaped and about 3 mm (0.12 in) thick, initially covered with very fine down, which is soon lost. The hairless, bluish grey, leathery leaves are long inverted egg-shaped to spade-shaped, 3–4½ cm (1.2–1.8 in) long and 5–13 mm (0.2–0.5 in) wide, have a thickened, purple to brownish tip, a prominent, entire margin, and are set on a distinct stalk. They are set alternately, slightly overlapping or at a distinct angle to the branch.

The flower heads are grouped with two to six at the tip of the branches, but may get overtopped later. They are globe-shaped and about 2 cm (0.8 in) across, on a stalk of up to 1½ cm long. The common base of the flowers in the same head is egg- to globe-shaped, about ½ cm (0.2 in) across. Uniquely, this species has an indistinctive involucre that consists of only a single whorl of lance-shaped bracts of about 6 mm (¼ in) long and 1½ mm (0.06 in) wide, that are covered with very fine down, each with a hardened pointy to stretched tip.

The very densely woolly, pointy bracts subtending the individual flower are oval to lance-shaped, about 5 mm (0.20 in) long and 2 mm (0.08 in) wide. The 4-merous perianth is 1⅓–1¾ cm (½–⅔ in) long, straight when still in the bud, pale pink in colour but deep claret near the top. The lower part, that remains merged when the flower is open, called tube, is hairless and 2–2½ mm (0.08–0.10 in) long. The segments in the middle part (or claws), where the perianth is split lengthwise, spread at right angles, are all the same length, shaggy to densely shaggy hairy, and coil back as soon as the flower opens. The segments in the upper part (or limbs), which enclosed the pollen presenter in the bud, are ellipse-shaped, about 2 mm (0.08 in) long, and covered with shaggy to short, dense, matted hairs. From the centre of the perianth emerges a straight, initially pale pink to carmine, later deep claret coloured style of 1¼–1¾ cm (½–⅔ in) long. The thickened part at the tip of the style called pollen presenter is hoof-shaped, about 1½ mm (0.06 in) long, at first brownish, later blackish to deep purple. The downy hairy ovary is ellipsoid to egg-shaped, about 1 mm (0.04 in) long, and clearly distinguished from the style. The ovary is subtended by four yellow, awl-shaped scales of about 1 mm long.

=== Differences with related species ===
Vexatorella alpina is an upright shrub of up to 1½ m high with groups of two to six heads at the tip of the branches, each subtended by a single row of bracts forming an inconspicuous involucre, and long inverted oval to elliptic leaves of 30–45 mm long and 5–13 mm wide, which is an endemic of the Kamiesberg. V. amoena has solitary flower heads each subtended by three or four whorls of bracts that form a conspicuous involucre, shorter oval to elliptic leaves of 15–30 mm long, which grows at the south end of the Kouebokkeveld Mountains and the adjacent Swartruggens range. V. latebrosa has solitary flower heads, each containing as much as forty to fifty flowers, line- to somewhat spoon-shaped leaves, and is an endemic of the Langeberg near Robertson. V. obtusata has linear or somewhat spoon-shaped leaves of 9–45 mm long. Its subspecies obtusata is a prostrate shrub that can only be found in the Montagu and Worcester districts, while subspecies albomontana is an upright shrub from around the Perdekloof Pass. Leucospermum secundifolium also has bracteoles that become woody, but its leaves are stalked and its flower heads are not at the tip of the branches, and grows on the southern slopes of the Klein Swartberg mountains.

== Taxonomy ==
As far as known, the Scottish plant collector James Niven was the first to collect the Kamiesberg vexator when he visited the Kamiesberge in 1801. One of his specimens was described by Richard Anthony Salisbury in a book published by Joseph Knight in 1809 titled On the cultivation of the plants belonging to the natural order of Proteeae, and called it Protea alpina. Only one year later, in 1810, Robert Brown published On the natural order of plants called Proteaceae, in which he made a description based on another specimen collected by Niven, which he called Leucadendron cartilagineum. It is assumed that Salisbury had seen a draft of Brown's paper and committed plagiarism. In 1816, Jean Louis Marie Poiret assigned Brown's species to the genus Protea, creating the new combination P. cartilaginea, in a book by Jean-Baptiste Lamarck. Edwin Percy Phillips assigned it to the genus Leucospermum in 1912, creating L. cartilagineum. In 1967 John Patrick Rourke realised that Salisbury's name has priority over Brown's, and created Leucospermum alpinum, which he made the type species of his new Section Xericola in 1970. In 1984 however, Rourke reassigned the taxa in Xericola to his newly erected genus Vexatorella, with the exception of L. secundifolium, that is now assigned to the section Diastelloidea. So Rourke created the combination Vexatorella alpina.

== Distribution, habitat and ecology ==
Vexatorella alpina can only be found in the Kamiesberge, the highest hills of Namaqualand, Northern Cape province, where it mostly grows in a vegetation type called Kamiesberg Granite Fynbos, at an altitude of 1300–1600 m (4250–5250 ft). It grows on soils derived from the Archaean granite bedrock in this area, and it apparently prefers the upper reaches of the slopes either facing north or south. The average annual precipitation is 200–500 mm (7½–20 in), more than 75% of which falls during the winter half year. Other plants that grow in the same vegetation are species of Metalasia, Cliffortia and Passerina.

== Conservation ==
The Kamiesberg vexator is considered a near threatened species, because it has a declining population in a limited distribution area of only 36 km^{2} (14 sq mi), divided over fifteen to twenty locations in which the subpopulations are declining due to frequent fire, that allows for too few young plants to grow, and increased isolation because surrounding sand pockets are ploughed to allow for grazing.
