= Sorocephalus palustris =

Conservation status
- Critically Endangered (IUCN 3.1)

Scientific classification
- Kingdom: Plantae
- Clade: Tracheophytes
- Clade: Angiosperms
- Clade: Eudicots
- Order: Proteales
- Family: Proteaceae
- Genus: Sorocephalus
- Species: S. palustris

Binomial name
- Sorocephalus palustris Rourke

Species of flowering plant

Sorocephalus palustris, the mat clusterhead or prostrate clusterhead, is a flowering shrub that belongs to the genus Sorocephalus and forms part of the fynbos. The plant is endemic to the Western Cape where it occurs on the Kogelberg. The plant was considered extinct and was last seen in 1984. Very little information is available on the species.

The shrub flowers from February. Fire destroys the plant but the seeds survive. The plant is bisexual and pollination takes place through the action of insects. Two months after the plant has flowered, the fruit ripens and the seeds fall to the ground where they are spread by ants. The plant grows in peaty soils at elevations of 1050 – 1200 m.

== Sources ==
- REDLIST Sanbi
- Protea Atlas
- Biodiversityexplorer
- Plants of the World Online
