= Sorocephalus pinifolius =

Conservation status
- Endangered (IUCN 3.1)

Scientific classification
- Kingdom: Plantae
- Clade: Tracheophytes
- Clade: Angiosperms
- Clade: Eudicots
- Order: Proteales
- Family: Proteaceae
- Genus: Sorocephalus
- Species: S. pinifolius

Binomial name
- Sorocephalus pinifolius (Salisb. ex Knight) Rourke

Species of flowering plant

Sorocephalus pinifolius, the long-leaf clusterhead, is a flowering shrub that belongs to the genus Sorocephalus and forms part of the fynbos. The plant is endemic to the Western Cape where it occurs on the Riviersonderendberge near Tygerhoek.

The shrub grows only 1 m high and flowers from June to October. Fire destroys the plant but the seeds survive. The plant is bisexual and pollination takes place through the action of insects. Two months after the plant has flowered, the fruit ripens and the seeds fall to the ground where they are spread by ants. The plant grows in sandy soil at elevations of 450 – 800 m.

== Sources ==
- REDLIST Sanbi
- Biodiversityexplorer
- Protea Atlas
- Plants of the World Online
