= Sorocephalus teretifolius =

Conservation status
- Endangered (IUCN 3.1)

Scientific classification
- Kingdom: Plantae
- Clade: Tracheophytes
- Clade: Angiosperms
- Clade: Eudicots
- Order: Proteales
- Family: Proteaceae
- Genus: Sorocephalus
- Species: S. teretifolius

Binomial name
- Sorocephalus teretifolius (Meisn.) E.Phillips

Species of flowering plant

Sorocephalus teretifolius, the pinhead clusterhead, is a flowering shrub that belongs to the genus Sorocephalus and forms part of the fynbos. The plant is endemic to the Western Cape where it occurs in the Palmiet River valley in the Kogelberg.

The shrub grows only 1 m high and flowers from November to December. Fire destroys the plant but the seeds survive. The plant is bisexual and pollination takes place through the action of insects. Two months after the plant has flowered, the fruit ripens and the seeds fall to the ground where they are spread by ants. The plant grows in rocky, dry slopes at elevations of 1500 – 1850 m.

== Sources ==
- REDLIST Sanbi
- Biodiversityexplorer
- Protea Atlas
- Protea Atlas 2
- Plants of the World Online
