= Sorocephalus clavigerus =

Conservation status
- Endangered (IUCN 3.1)

Scientific classification
- Kingdom: Plantae
- Clade: Tracheophytes
- Clade: Angiosperms
- Clade: Eudicots
- Order: Proteales
- Family: Proteaceae
- Genus: Sorocephalus
- Species: S. clavigerus

Binomial name
- Sorocephalus clavigerus (Salisb. ex Knight) Hutch.

Species of flowering plant

Sorocephalus clavigerus, the erect clusterhead, is a flowering shrub that belongs to the genus Sorocephalus and forms part of the fynbos. The plant is endemic to the Western Cape where it occurs on the Kogelberg and Kleinrivierberge.

The shrub grows only 100 cm high and flowers from July to December. Fire destroys the plant but the seeds survive. The plant is bisexual and pollination takes place through the action of insects. Two months after the plant has flowered, the fruit ripens and the seeds fall to the ground where they are spread by ants. The plant grows in sandy soil at elevations of 450 – 1200 m.

== Sources ==
- REDLIST Sanbi
- Biodiversityexplorer
- Protea Atlas
- Plants of the World Online
