= Sorocephalus scabridus =

Conservation status
- Critically Endangered (IUCN 3.1)

Scientific classification
- Kingdom: Plantae
- Clade: Tracheophytes
- Clade: Angiosperms
- Clade: Eudicots
- Order: Proteales
- Family: Proteaceae
- Genus: Sorocephalus
- Species: S. scabridus

Binomial name
- Sorocephalus scabridus Meisn.

Species of flowering plant

Sorocephalus scabridus, the Tulbagh clusterhead, is a flowering shrub that belongs to the genus Sorocephalus and forms part of the fynbos. The plant is endemic to the Western Cape where it occurs in the Great Winterhoek Mountains to the Olifants River Mountains.

The shrub grows only 80 cm high, grows upright and flowers from October to January. Fire destroys the plant but the seeds survive. The plant is bisexual and pollination takes place through the action of insects. Two months after the plant has flowered, the fruit ripens and the seeds fall to the ground where they are spread by ants. The plant grows in mountainous areas between rocks in sandstone soil at elevations of 900 – 1850 m.

== Sources ==
- REDLIST Sanbi
- Biodiversityexplorer
- Protea Atlas
- Plants of the World Online
