= Sorocephalus tenuifolius =

Conservation status
- Endangered (IUCN 3.1)

Scientific classification
- Kingdom: Plantae
- Clade: Tracheophytes
- Clade: Angiosperms
- Clade: Eudicots
- Order: Proteales
- Family: Proteaceae
- Genus: Sorocephalus
- Species: S. tenuifolius

Binomial name
- Sorocephalus tenuifolius R.Br.

Species of flowering plant

Sorocephalus tenuifolius, the diminutive clusterhead, is a flowering shrub that belongs to the genus Sorocephalus and forms part of the fynbos. The plant is endemic to the Western Cape where it occurs in the Palmiet River valley in the Kogelberg. The plant was considered extinct in 1987 but a new population was discovered.

The shrub grows only 1 m high and flowers from January to February. Fire destroys the plant but the seeds survive. The plant is bisexual and pollination takes place through the action of insects. Two months after the plant has flowered, the fruit ripens and the seeds fall to the ground where they are spread by ants. The plant grows in moist, sandy soil at elevations of 400 m.

== Sources ==
- REDLIST Sanbi
- Biodiversityexplorer
- Protea Atlas
- Plants of the World Online
