= Sorocephalus imbricatus =

Conservation status
- Critically Endangered (IUCN 3.1)

Scientific classification
- Kingdom: Plantae
- Clade: Tracheophytes
- Clade: Angiosperms
- Clade: Eudicots
- Order: Proteales
- Family: Proteaceae
- Genus: Sorocephalus
- Species: S. imbricatus

Binomial name
- Sorocephalus imbricatus (Thunb.) R.Br.

Synonyms
- Protea imbricata Thunb.; Soranthe glanduligera Knight; Soranthe imbricata (Thunb.) Kuntze

Species of flowering plant

Sorocephalus imbricatus, the tile-leaf clusterhead, is a flower-bearing shrub that belongs to the genus Sorocephalus and forms part of the fynbos. The plant is native to the Western Cape where it is found in the Piketberg, Groot Winterhoek and Elandskloof mountains. However, plants were last observed at the latter two sites 50 years ago.

The shrub grows 2 m (6 ft 7 in) tall and flowers from August to September. Fire destroyed the plant but the seeds have survived. The plant is bisexual and pollination takes place through the action of insects. The fruit ripens, two months after flowering, and the seeds fall to the ground where they are spread by ants. The plant grows together with sandstone fynbos in mountainous shale at elevations of 330–860 m (1,080–2,820 ft).
