= Sorocephalus capitatus =

Conservation status
- Vulnerable (IUCN 3.1)

Scientific classification
- Kingdom: Plantae
- Clade: Tracheophytes
- Clade: Angiosperms
- Clade: Eudicots
- Order: Proteales
- Family: Proteaceae
- Genus: Sorocephalus
- Species: S. capitatus

Binomial name
- Sorocephalus capitatus Rourke

Species of flowering plant

Sorocephalus capitatusis, the woolly clusterhead, is a flowering shrub that belongs to the genus Sorocephalus and forms part of the fynbos. The plant is endemic to the Western Cape where it occurs on the Piketberg and Onderboskloof in the Koue Bokkeveld.

The shrub grows only 80 cm tall, tends to spread and flowers from September to February. Fire destroys the plant but the seeds survive. The plant is bisexual and pollination takes place through the action of insects. Two months after the plant has flowered, the fruit ripens and the seeds fall to the ground where they are spread by ants. The plant grows in sandy patches between sandstone at elevations of 910 – 1200 m.

== Sources ==
- REDLIST Sanbi
- Biodiversityexplorer
- Protea Atlas
- Plants of the World Online
