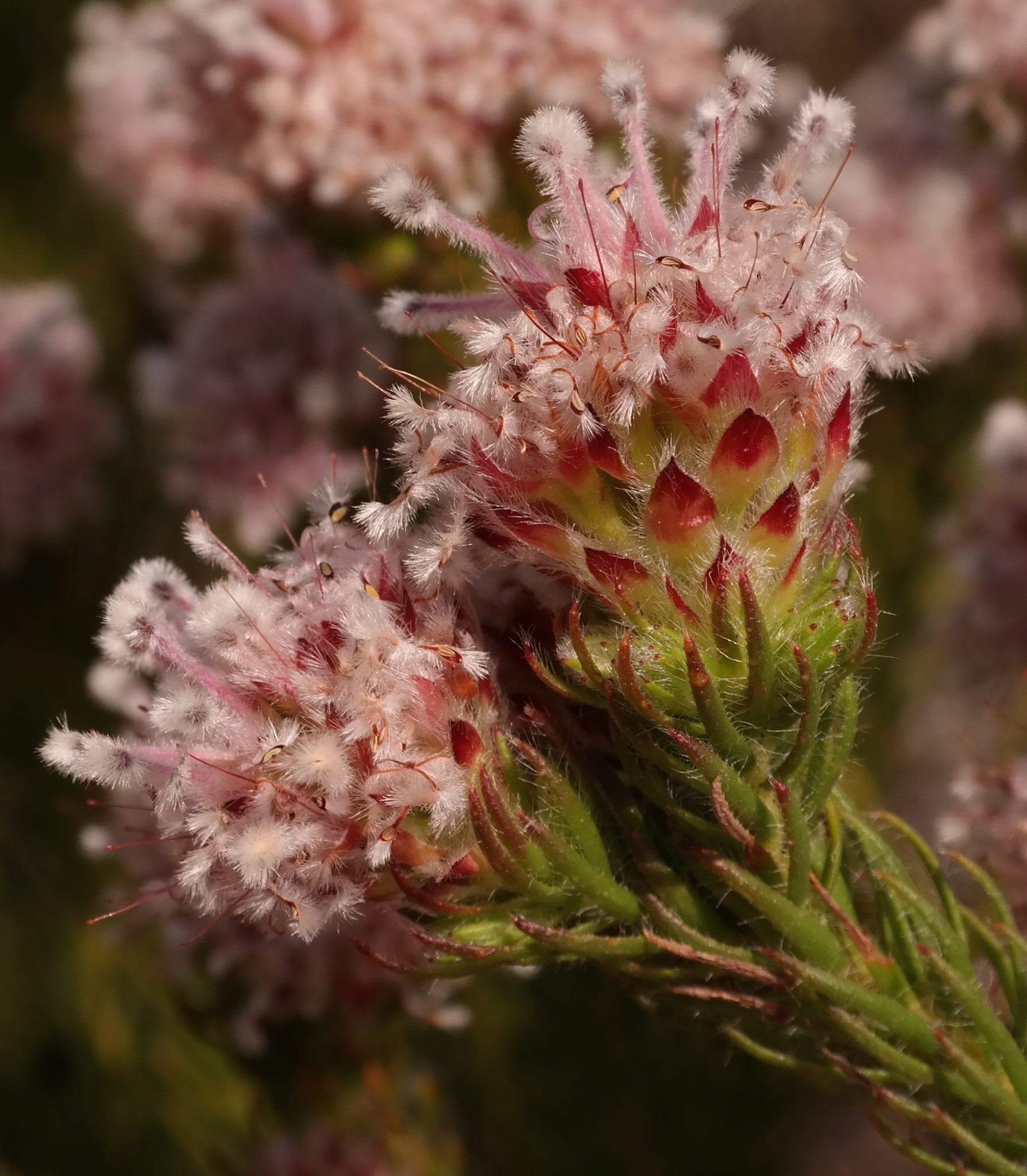

Conservation status
- Least Concern (IUCN 3.1)

Scientific classification
- Kingdom: Plantae
- Clade: Tracheophytes
- Clade: Angiosperms
- Clade: Eudicots
- Order: Proteales
- Family: Proteaceae
- Genus: Sorocephalus
- Species: S. lanatus

Binomial name
- Sorocephalus lanatus (Thunb.) R.Br.

Synonyms
- Protea lanata Thunb.; Soranthe ciliciiflora Knight; Soranthe lanata (Thunb.) Kuntze; Soranthe phylicoides (Meisn.) Kuntze; Sorocephalus phylicoides Meisn.; Sorocephalus schlechteri E.Phillips

= Sorocephalus lanatus =

Species of flowering plant

Sorocephalus lanatus, the common clusterhead, is a flower-bearing shrub that belongs to the genus Sorocephalus and forms part of the fynbos. The plant is native to the Western Cape and occurs in the Cederberg, Groot Winterhoek and Hex River Mountains.

The shrub grows only 80 cm tall, tends to spread and flowers from September to April with the peak in December. Fire destroys the plant but the seeds survive. The plant is bisexual and pollination takes place through the action of insects. The fruit ripens, two months after flowering, and the seeds fall to the ground where they are spread by ants. The plant's habitat varies according to elevation, it is found at elevations of 1500-1850 m.
