= Sorocephalus crassifolius =

Conservation status
- Critically Endangered (IUCN 3.1)

Scientific classification
- Kingdom: Plantae
- Clade: Tracheophytes
- Clade: Angiosperms
- Clade: Eudicots
- Order: Proteales
- Family: Proteaceae
- Genus: Sorocephalus
- Species: S. crassifolius

Binomial name
- Sorocephalus crassifolius Hutch.

Species of flowering plant

Sorocephalus crassifolius, commonly known as the flowerless clusterhead, is a flowering shrub in the family Proteaceae. It forms part of the South African fynbos and is endemic to the Western Cape, specifically the Riviersonderendberge mountains. The plant was last observed flowering in the 1980s and is now critically endangered, with only 15 known individuals remaining.

This low-growing shrub reaches about 80 cm (31 in) in height and flowers between December and February. It is adapted to fire-prone environments and can resprout after burning. The species is bisexual, and insect pollination is the primary reproductive mechanism. Approximately two months after flowering, its fruit ripens and seeds are dispersed by ants. Sorocephalus crassifolius typically grows at elevations between 1,280 metres (4,200 ft) and 1,460 metres (4,790 ft).
