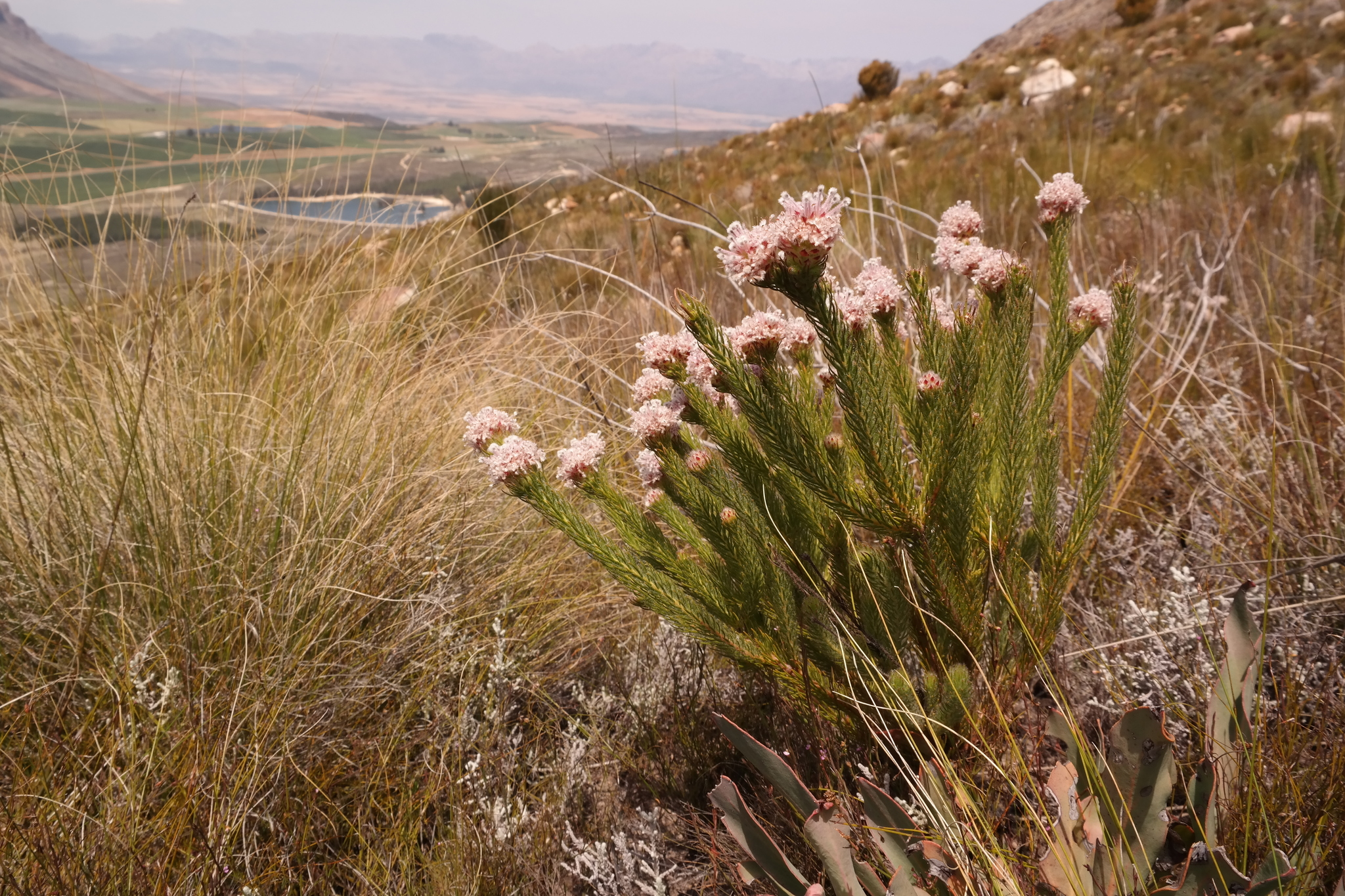
- Sorocephalus lanatus

Scientific classification
- Kingdom: Plantae
- Clade: Tracheophytes
- Clade: Angiosperms
- Clade: Eudicots
- Order: Proteales
- Family: Proteaceae
- Subfamily: Proteoideae
- Tribe: Leucadendreae
- Subtribe: Leucadendrinae
- Genus: Sorocephalus; R.Br.

Type species
- Sorocephalus imbricatus (Thunb.) R.Br.

Species
- 11, See text.

Synonyms
- Soranthe Salisb. ex Knight

= Sorocephalus =

Genus of plants endemic to the Cape Floristic Region of South Africa

Sorocephalus is a genus containing 11 species of flowering plants in the family Proteaceae. Commonly known as clusterheads or powderpuffs, they are small shrubs up to 1.5 metres (4.9 ft) tall, characterised by their flower heads containing clusters of 4-9 flowers.

All species are endemic to the Cape Floristic Region of South Africa, more particularly the winter rainfall zone of the southwestern Cape. 10 species are threatened and known only from a few locations within a limited distribution, two of which have had no official sightings for decades and may be extinct.

== Description ==
Members of the genus Sorocephalus are small shrubs which grow up to 1.5 metres (4.9 ft) tall with an erect or low, sprawling and decumbent habit. Branches are often covered with upright leaves which overlap each other imbricately, similar to roof tiles or fish scales. Leaves have an entire margins with a pointed apex and may be linear, terete and needle-like with a prominet groove on the upper surface, or semi-terete or lanceolate with a flat or concave surface. Young leaves are often pubescent, becoming glabrous (hairless) as they mature.

Inflorescences are a panicle or a capitulum in the case of S. teretifolius with clusters of lateral racemes containing anywhere between 4-9 flowers each.

== Taxonomy ==
Sorocephalus was first formally described in 1810 by Robert Brown in Transactions of the Linnean Society of London. The genus name means 'clustered head' and originates from the Greek words 'soros' meaning 'a heap' and 'cephale' meaning 'head', referring to the compound inflorescences characteristic of most species.

=== Species ===
11 species are currently accepted by Plants of the World Online.

Common and scientific names	Distribution	IUCN status and population estimate	SANBI status	Image
Woolly-stalk powderpuff, woolly-stalk clusterhead Sorocephalus alopecurus Rourke	Riviersonderend Mountains	700-1,000	Endangered	
Woolly powderpuff, woolly clusterhead Sorocephalus capitatus Rourke	Piketberg and Onderboskloof, KoueBokkeveld Mountains	753-63,633	Vulnerable	
Erect powderpuff, erect clusterhead Sorocephalus clavigerus (Knight) Hutch.	Hottentots Holland to Kogelberg mountains. Locally extinct in Kleinrivier Mountains.	273-2,400	Endangered	
Flowerless powderpuff, erect clusterhead Sorocephalus crassifolius Hutch.	Riviersonderend Mountains	(Possibly extinct) 0-49	Critically endangered (Possibly extinct)	
Lanceolate-leaf powderpuff, tile-leaf clusterhead Sorocephalus imbricatus (Thunb.) R. Br.	Elandskloof mountains. Locally extinct in Piketberg and Groot Winterhoek mountains	160	Critically endangered	
Common powderpuff, common clusterhead Sorocephalus lanatus R. Br.	Cedarberg to Hex River Mountains	5,940-443,481	Least concern	
Prostrate powderpuff, mat clusterhead Sorocephalus palustris Rourke	Kogelberg Mountains	(Possibly extinct) 0-15	Critically endangered (Possibly extinct)	
Long-leaf powderpuff, long-leaf clusterhead Sorocephalus pinifolius Rourke	Riviersonderend Mountains	600-11,430	Endangered	
Tulbagh powderpuff, Tulbagh clusterhead Sorocephalus scabridus Meisn.	Groot Winterhoek Mountains	251-1,000	Critically endangered	
Diminutive powderpuff, diminutive clusterhead Sorocephalus tenuifolius R.Br.	Palmiet River Mountains between Grabouw and Kogelberg	2,000-11,795	Endangered	
Pin-shaped powderpuff, pinhead clusterhead Sorocephalus teretifolius (Meisn.) E.Phillips	Du Toitskloof Mountains to Blokkop	98-3,678	Endangered	

== Distribution and habitat ==
All Sorocephalus species are endemic to mountanous regions of the South Western Cape Province of South Africa. They occur mostly at elevations of 1,200–1,800 metres (4,000–6,000 ft) above sea level, but may also be found at lower elevations. Most species have highly localised and restricted distributions, being known from a single area.

== Conservation ==
With the exception of S. lanatus, all Sorocephalus species are regarded as threatened by the International Union for Conservation of Nature (IUCN) and the South African National Biodiversity Institute (SANBI). One species, S. capitatus is listed as vulnerable, five (S. alopecurus, S. clavigerus, S. pinifolius, S. tenuifolius and S. teretifolius) are listed as endangered and four (S. crassifolius, S. imbricatus, S. palustris and S. scabridus) are listed as critically endangered, two of which, S. crassifolius and S. palustris, are regarded as possibly extinct, with no official sightings since 2001 and 1984 respectively. There is an unconfirmed record of fifteen S. palustris plants being sighted in 2005, but apart from that, no newer records are known.

The most significant threats to these species are competition from non-native and invasive plants such as pines and Hakea, an increased frequency and intensity of wildfires and habitat destruction associated with human activity.
