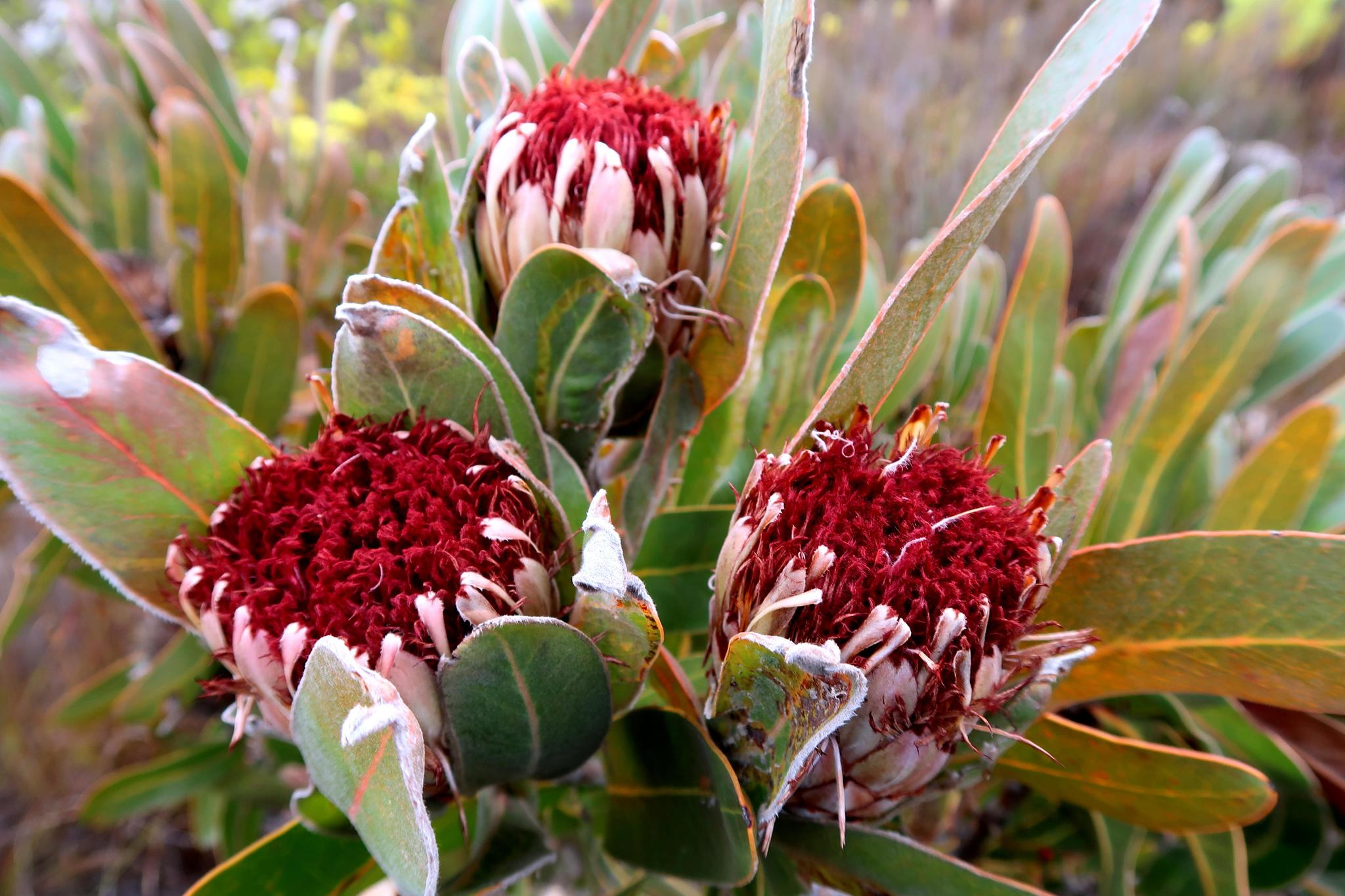

Conservation status
- Least Concern (IUCN 3.1)

Scientific classification
- Kingdom: Plantae
- Clade: Tracheophytes
- Clade: Angiosperms
- Clade: Eudicots
- Order: Proteales
- Family: Proteaceae
- Genus: Protea
- Species: P. lorifolia

Binomial name
- Protea lorifolia (Salisb. ex. Knight) Fourc.

Synonyms
- Erodendrum lorifolium Salisb. ex. Knight; Protea macrophylla R.Br.; Scolymocephalus macrophyllus (R.Br.) Kuntze

= Protea lorifolia =

Species of shrub

Protea lorifolia, in English called the strap-leaved sugarbush, strap-leaved protea or strap-leaf sugarbush is a flowering shrub which belongs to the genus Protea.

In Afrikaans this species is known by the vernacular name of riemblaar-suikerbos.

The tree's national number is 91.

== Taxonomy ==
Protea lorifolia was first described as Erodendrum lorifolium by Richard Anthony Salisbury in the 1809 work ostensibly authored by the gardener Joseph Knight titled On the cultivation of the plants belonging to the natural order of Proteeae. It was moved to the genus Protea by Henry Georges Fourcade in 1932.

== Description ==
The compact, round-shaped shrub grows up to three metres in height, and blooms from April to October. The plant is monoecious with both sexes in each flower.

== Distribution ==
The plant is endemic to the Cape Provinces of South Africa. Its distribution covers a wide area, from the Koue Bokkeveld Mountains through the Swartberg, Riviersonderend and Langeberg Mountains, to the Baviaanskloofberge and Kouga Mountains. It can be seen near the towns of Makhanda and Riebeek East, and on the Boschberg mountain in Somerset East.

== Ecology ==
Potential wildfires destroy the adult plants, but the seeds can survive such events, being safely stored in a cap. The seeds are eventually dispersed by means of the wind. Pollination occurs through the action of birds. The plant grows on dry slopes in sandstone-derived soils, and is found at altitudes of 450 to 1,400 metres.

== Conservation ==
It is not threatened.

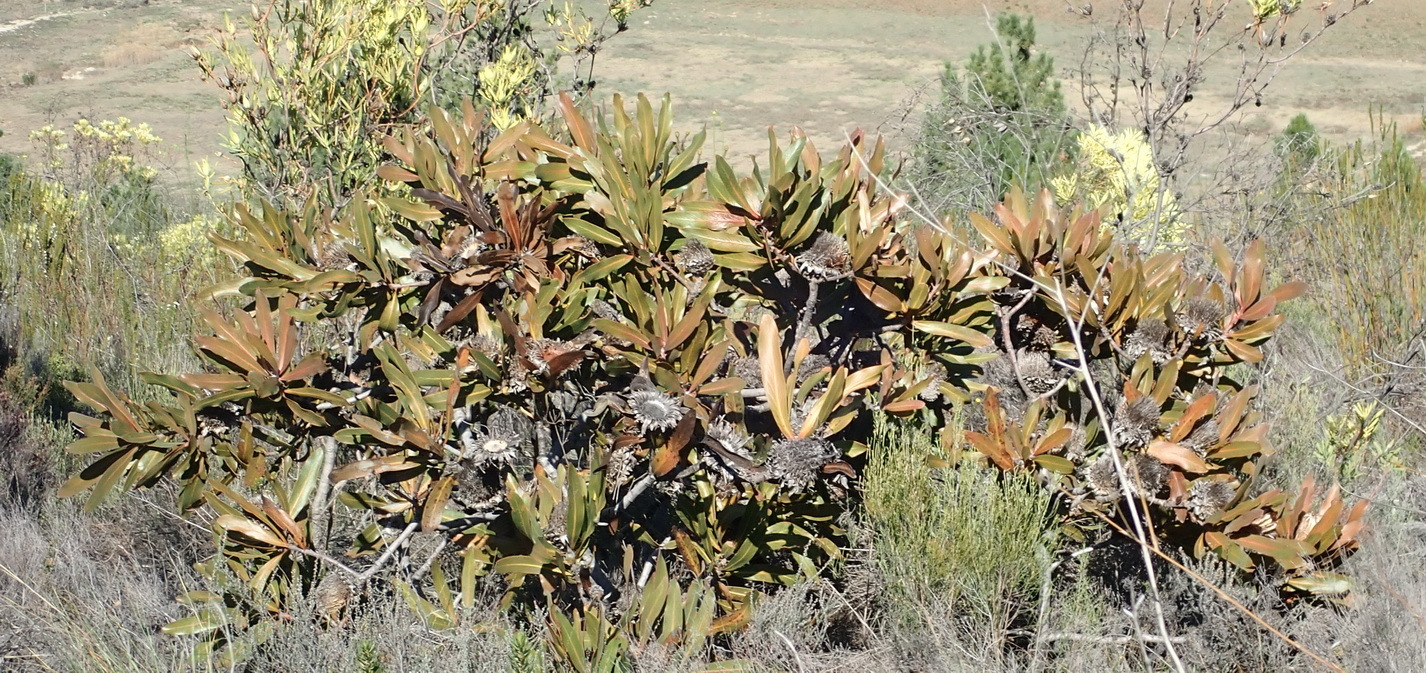
Protea lorifolia with dried inflorescences in August
