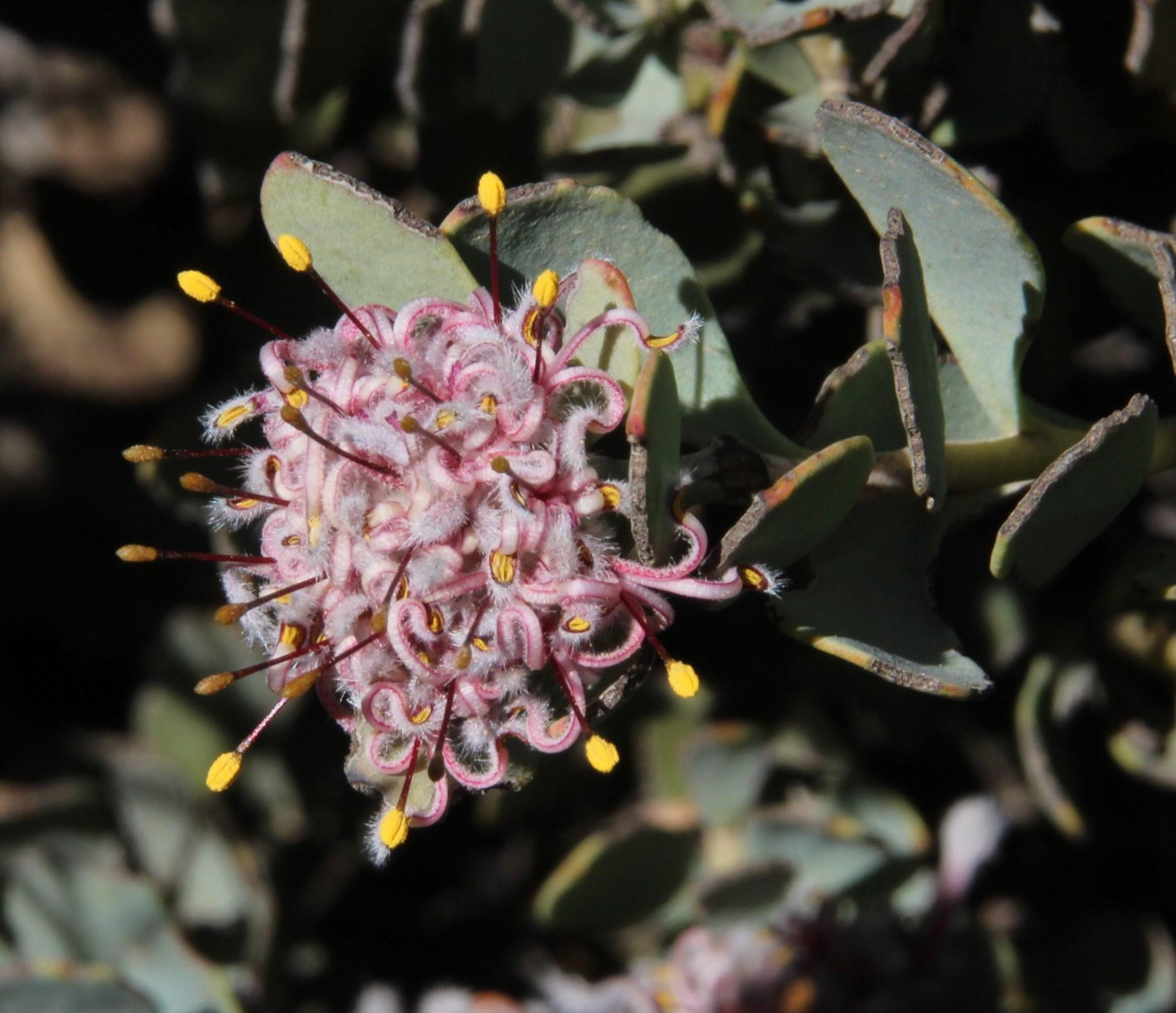
- Vexatorella amoena, photo: Tony Rebelo

Scientific classification
- Kingdom: Plantae
- Clade: Tracheophytes
- Clade: Angiosperms
- Clade: Eudicots
- Order: Proteales
- Family: Proteaceae
- Subfamily: Proteoideae
- Tribe: Leucadendreae
- Subtribe: Leucadendrinae
- Genus: Vexatorella; Rourke, 1984

= Vexatorella =

Genus of flowering plants

Vexatorella is a genus containing four species of flowering plant, commonly known as vexators, in the family Proteaceae. The genus is endemic to the Cape Floristic Region of South Africa. The name means "little trouble-maker", given with reference to the initial difficulties of placing V. latebrosa within the family. All species are shrubs which occur in dry fynbos habitats on the fringes of the Succulent Karoo ecoregion. The inflorescences are similar to those of the related leucospermums but also share features of the leucadendrons, with the floral bracts becoming woody and enlarged following pollination. The flowers are insect-pollinated, with the seeds dispersed by ants (myrmecochory).

== Description ==
Vexators are upright or spreading evergreen shrubs with alternately set, narrow, spade-shaped leaves ending bluntly in a bony tip, with an entire margin, and greyish or bluish in colour. The stalked flower heads are mostly set individually, sometimes with two to six together at the end of the stems, opening from the center outwards. The individual flowers are 4-merous, star symmetrical and hermaphrodite. The four perianth segments are pink or cream-coloured, and have a sweet smell. From their center, a straight style emerges that is hairless or powdery. The thickened part at its tip called pollen presenter is cleft at its tip. The ovary is egg- to bottle-shaped, consists of one carpel and contains just one cavity with one hanging primordial seed. The ovary is subtended by four free awl-shaped scales. The fruit is an egg-shaped hairless or powdery achene, that is beaked at its tip, and blunt and wrinkly at its base. The bracteoles that support the individual flowers become woody after flowering, a character that set Vexatorella apart from Leucospermum except for L. secundifolium that also develops woody bracteoles.

== Taxonomy ==
Comparison of homologous DNA has increased the insight in the phylogenetic relationships between the Proteaceae. Vexatorella belongs to a group that (except for Leucospermum saxosum) further only consists of genera endemic to the Cape Floristic Region, that together constitute the subtribe Leucadendrinae. Vexatorella is the closest relative of Paranomus. The genera Sorocephalus and Spatalla are the sister group to the Vexatorella and Paranomus. The following trees together represent those insights.

- subtribe Leucadendrinae
  - Leucadendron
  - - - - Leucospermum
        - Mimetes, Diastella and Orothamnus
      - - - Vexatorella
          - Paranomus
        - - Sorocephalus
          - Spatalla
    - Serruria

The described subtaxa are:

- Vexatorella alpina (Salisb. ex Knight) Rourke – Kamiesberg vexator
- Vexatorella amoena (Rourke) Rourke – Swartruggens vexator
- Vexatorella latebrosa Rourke – Robertson vexator
- Vexatorella obtusata (Thunb.) Rourke
  - Vexatorella obtusata subsp. obtusata – Montagu vexator
  - Vexatorella obtusata subsp. albomontana – Witteberg vexator
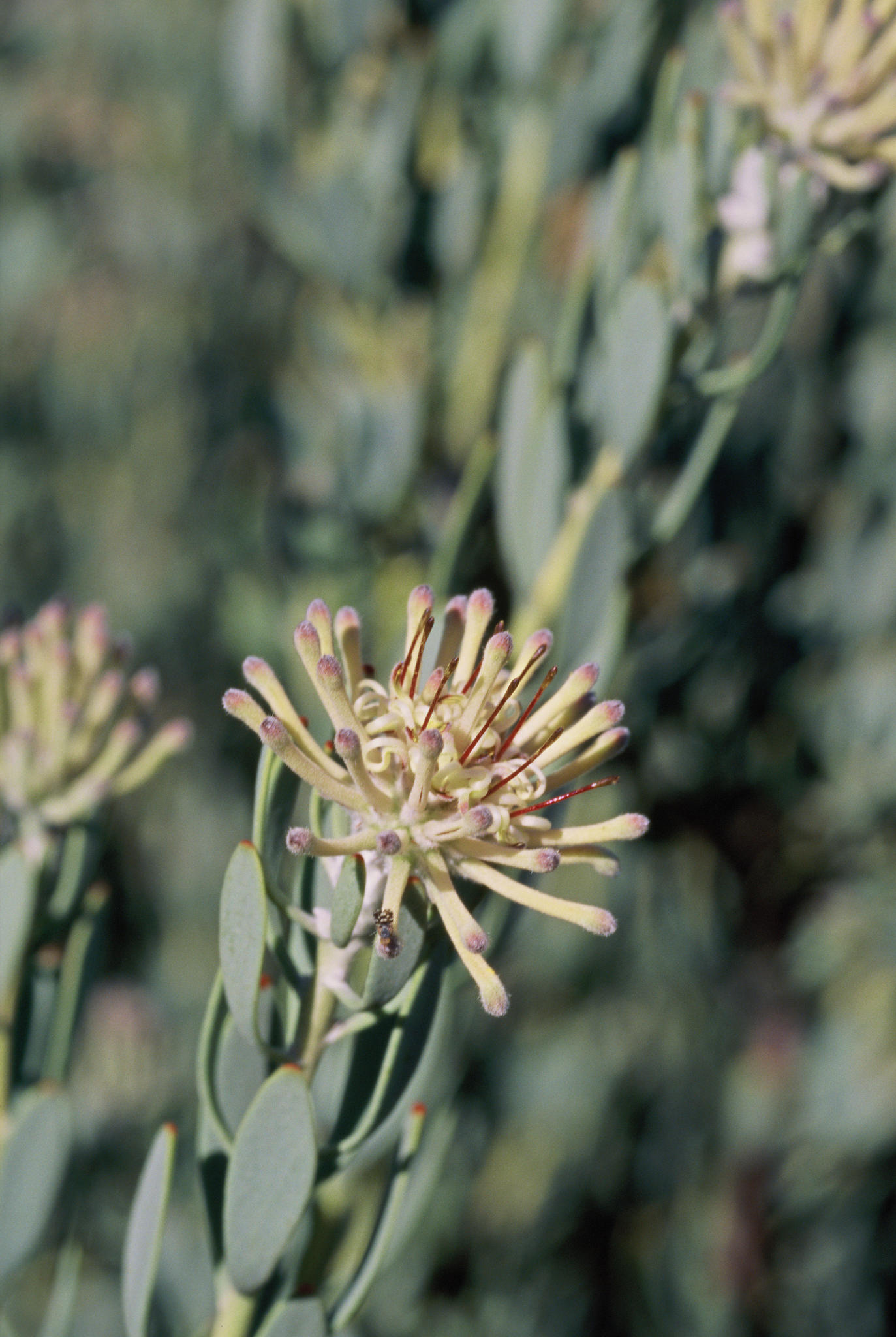
Kamiesberg vexator

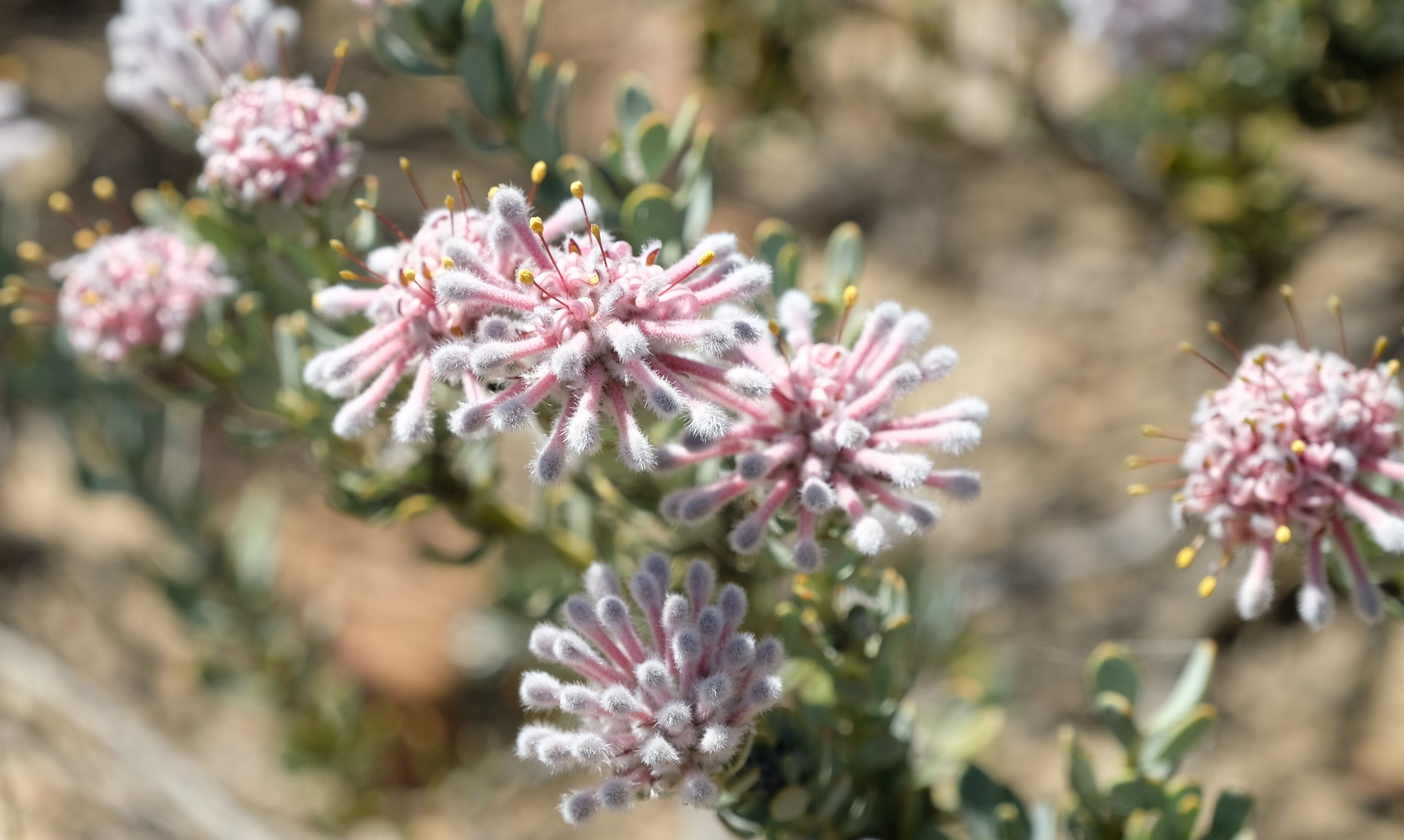
Swartruggens vexator

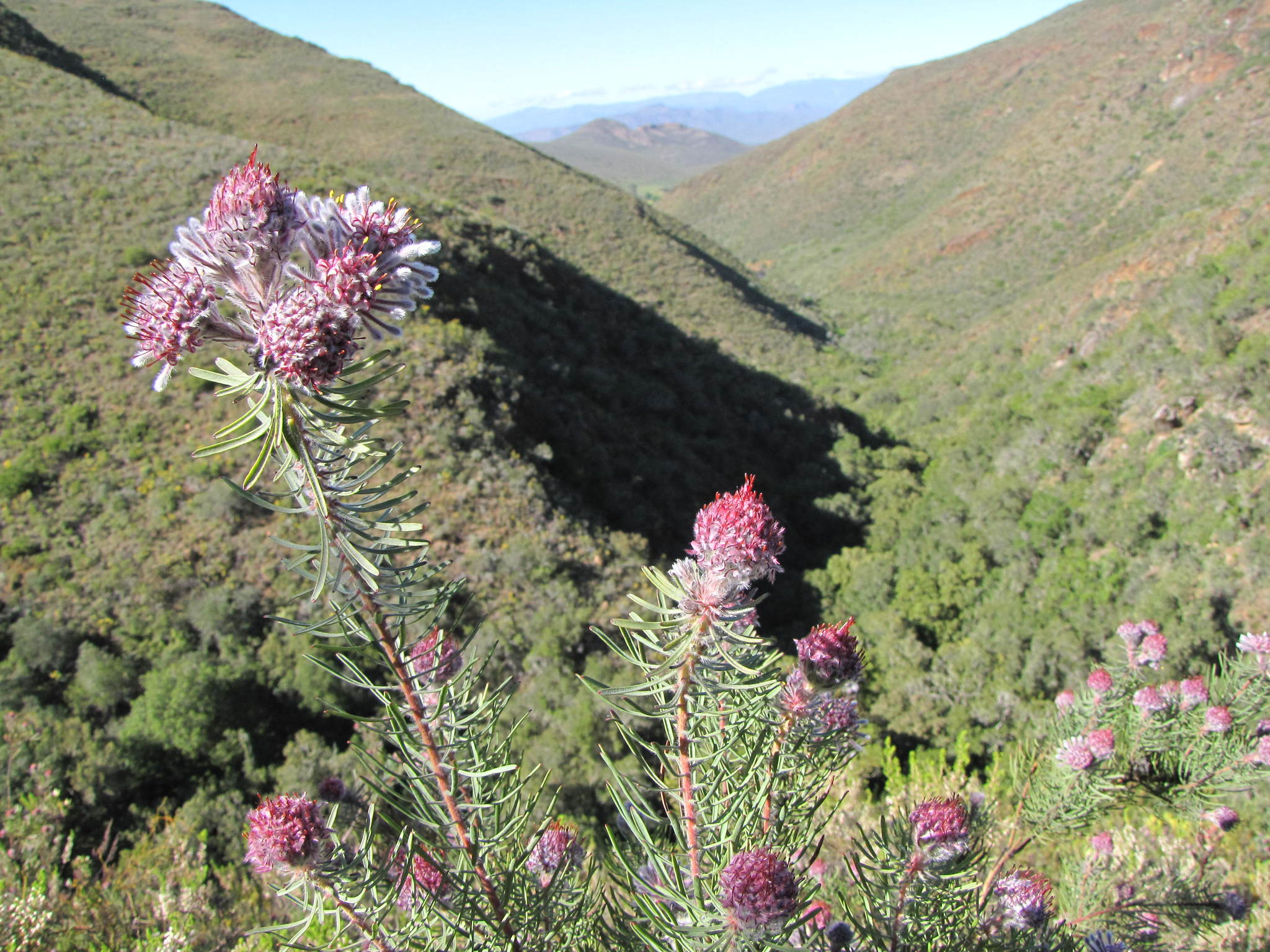
Robertson vexator

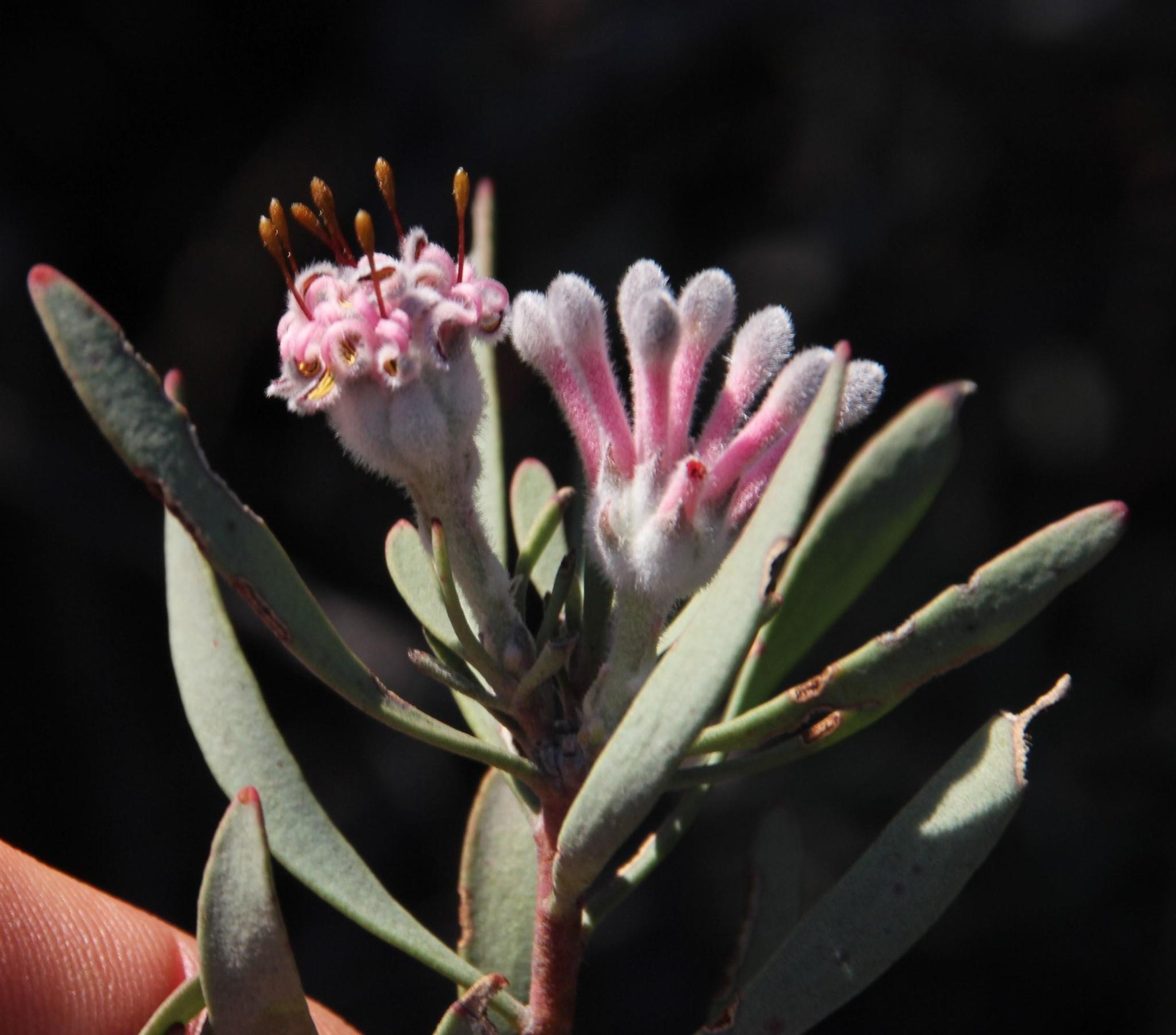
Witteberg vexator

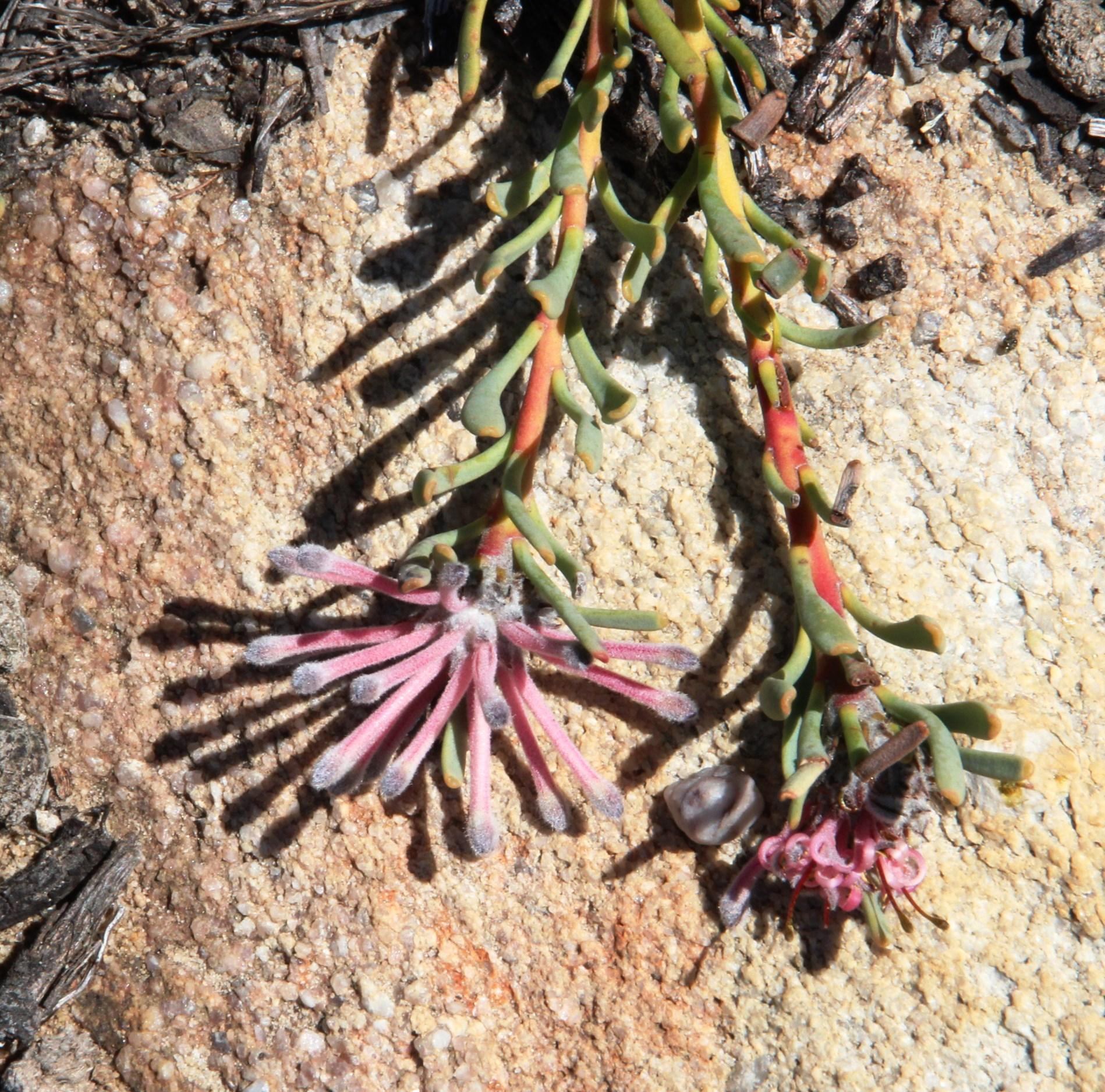
Montagu vexator

== Conservation ==
Of the four species and two subspecies, the continued survival of three taxa, Vexatorella amoena and of V. obtusata both subsp. albomontana and obtusata, is considered to be of least concern. V. alpina is thought to be a near-threatened species. Vexatorella latebrosa on the other hand regarded as being critically endangered.
