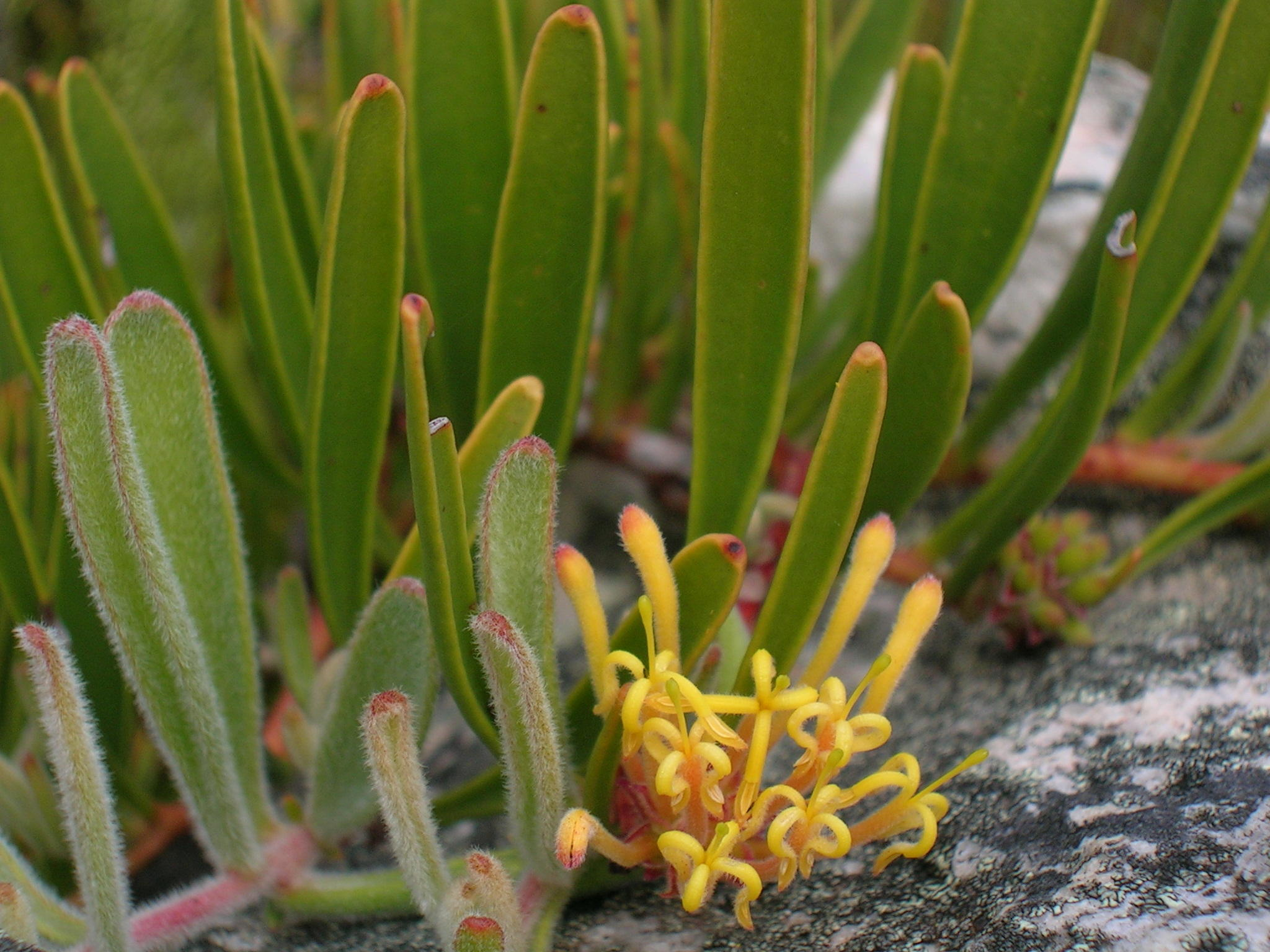

Conservation status
- Near Threatened (IUCN 3.1)

Scientific classification
- Kingdom: Plantae
- Clade: Embryophytes
- Clade: Tracheophytes
- Clade: Angiosperms
- Clade: Eudicots
- Order: Proteales
- Family: Proteaceae
- Genus: Leucospermum
- Species: L. secundifolium

Binomial name
- Leucospermum secundifolium Rourke, 1970

= Leucospermum secundifolium =

Species of plant native to South Africa

Leucospermum secundifolium is a low, evergreen shrub that grows along the ground, the tip of the branches slightly rising, which has been assigned to the family Proteaceae. It has narrowly elliptic leaves with a distinct leafstalk, and few-flowered and very small heads of 1–1½ cm (0.4–0.6 in) across. It is called stalked pincushion in English. The sweetly scented flower heads may be found around early December. It is an endemic species that only grows in a small area of the Western Cape province of South-Africa.

== Description ==
Leucospermum secundifolium is a low shrub that grows along the ground with the tips rising up, that has very slender and rather diffuse stems of 1½–2 cm in diameter. These are initially covered in felty or woolly hairs, which are soon lost. The initially thickly felty or woolly elliptic leaves soon loose these hairs, are 5–8 cm (2−3¼ in) long and ¾–1½ cm (0.3–0.6 in) wide, have a stalk of 1–2 cm (0.4–0.8 in) long at their base, a rounded tip with one, sometimes three bony teeth and horny margins that are sometimes rolled inwards. The alternately set leaves are upright at right angles to the branches.

The very small globe-shaped flower heads of 1–1½ cm (0.4–0.6 in) across are mostly individually set in the axils of leaves near the tips of the branches on a thickly felty or woolly stalk of ½–1½ cm (0.2–0.6 in) long, and contains twelve to thirty flowers. The common base of the flowers in the same head is flattened globe-shaped and at only about 2 mm across comparatively very small. The bracts that subtend the head are set in a single whorl, each lance-shaped with a pointy tip, about 6 mm (¼ in) long and 1½–2 mm (0.06–0.08 in) wide.

The bract that subtends each flower individually is lance-shaped to broadly oval, with a pointy tip, somewhat cartilaginous in consistency, covered with a thick layer of felty hairs, growing to approximately 1 cm long and becoming woody after the flower has been pollinated. The straight 4-merous perianth is about 16 mm (⅔ in) long. The lowest, fully merged, part of the perianth, called tube is 4–5 mm (0.16–0.20 in) long, cylinder-shaped, hairless at its base and felty higher up. The middle part (or claws), where the perianth is split lengthwise is slender, felty, about ¾ mm (0.03 in) wide, with all four perianth claws curling back to the top of the tube when the flower opens. The upper part (or limbs), which enclosed the pollen presenter in the bud, consists of four lance-shaped to elliptic lobes of about 2 mm (0.08 in) long and 1 mm wide, with few soft of felty hairs. From the perianth emerges a thread-like style of about 1.4 cm (0.56 in) long, that very slightly tapers nearing the tip. The thickened part at the tip of the style called pollen presenter is bluntly hoof-shaped, about 1 mm long with a groove that functions as the stigma across the very tip. The ovary is subtended by four opaque, awl-shaped scales of about ½ mm long.

=== Differences with related species ===
L. secundifolium can be distinguished from other species by its upright, eventually hairless rounded and narrowly elliptic leaves with a distinct stalk and its very small (1–1½ cm across) and few flowered heads. A unique feature among Leucospermum species is that the bracteoles that subtend the individual flowers become woody after flowering. This character is shared with the species of the genus Vexatorella, but in vexators, the individual flower head, or panicle of heads, is at the very tip of the stem.

== Taxonomy ==
As far as we know, the stalked pincushion was first collected for science in 1928 by Mary Pocock, a specimen in fruit. Only after material in flower was collected in 1956, a full description became possible. John Patrick Rourke described it and named it Leucospermum secundifolium in 1970.

L. secundifolium has been assigned to the section Diastelloidea.

The species name secundifolium is compounded from the Latin words secundum (second or fortunate) and folium (leaf) and indicates that the leaves of this species are all upright.

== Distribution, habitat and ecology ==
The stalked pincushion can only be found on the south slopes of the Klein Swartberg mountains, between Seweweekspoort and Towerkop at an elevation of around 1200 m (4000 ft), where it grows on Table Mountain Sandstone. The average annual precipitation in this area is 250–380 mm (10–15 in), mainly falling during the winter half year.

The species is pollinated by insects, such as butterflies, flies and bees. The ripe fruits fall to the ground about two months after flowering, where these are collected by native ants, that carry them to their nests. Here they remain underground, safe from fire, seed-eating rodents and birds, until an overhead fire clears the vegetation and triggers the seeds to germinate.

== Conservation ==
The stalked pincushion is considered a rare species because although it is not threatened at present in its mountainous habitat, it is restricted to an area of just 232 km^{2} (90 sq mi).
