= Bokkeveld Group =

Devonian sedimentary rocks in South Africa

- Stratigraphic range: Early-Middle Devonian; ~419–382 Ma
- Type: Geological group
- Sub-units: Gydo, Gamka, Voorstehoek, Hex River, Tra-Tra, Boplaas, Waboomberg, Wuppertal, Klipbokkop, Osberg & Karoopoort Formations
- Underlies: Witteberg Group
- Overlies: Table Mountain Group

Lithology
- Primary: Sandstone, mudstone, siltstone, shale, and conglomerates
- Other: Calcite

Location
- Region: Western & Eastern Cape
- Country: South Africa

Type section
- Named for: Bokkeveld mountains
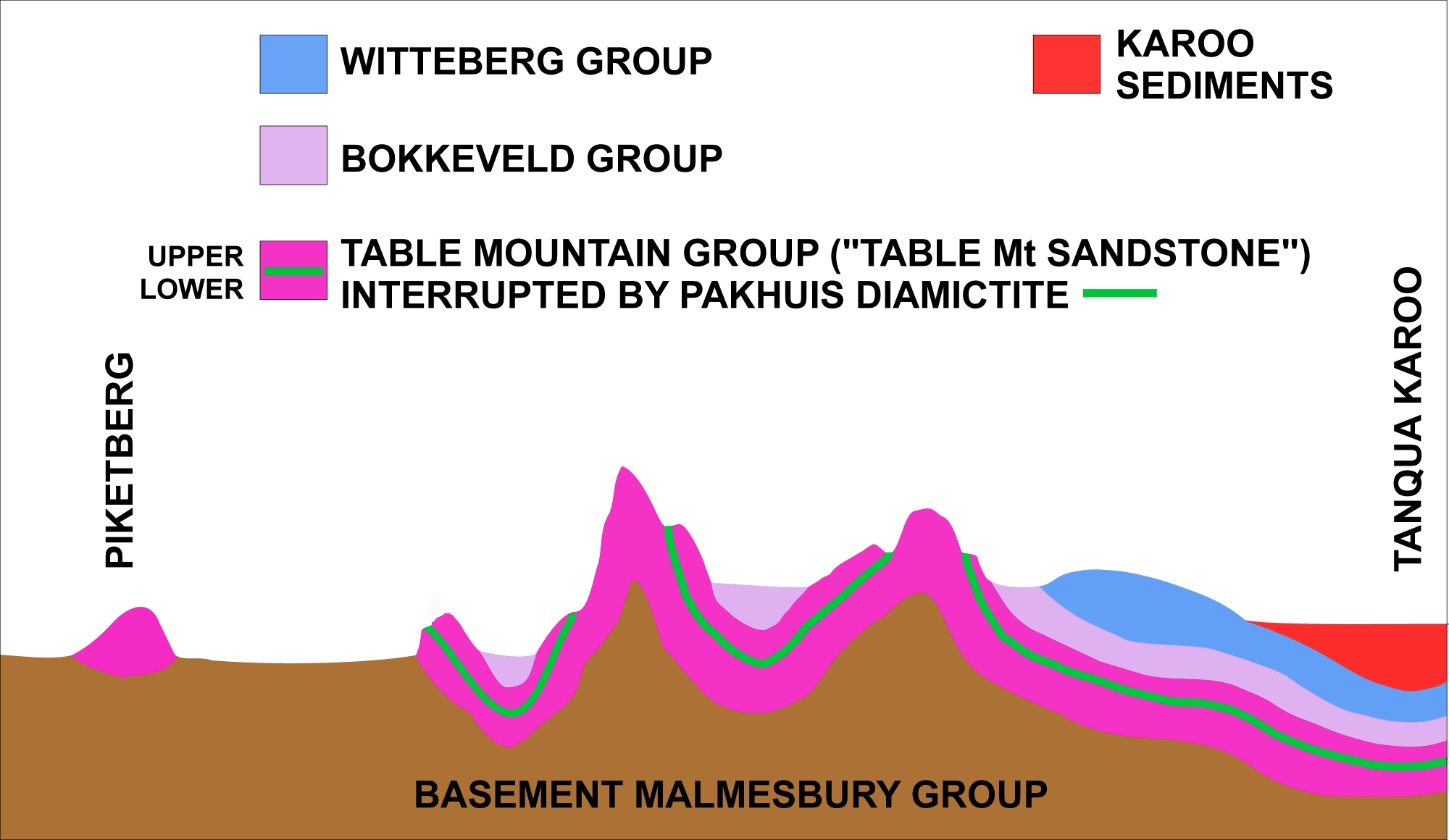
- Schematic diagram of a west-east (left - right) geological cross section through the Cedarberg portion of the Cape Fold Belt (South Africa). The rock layers represent the three main subdivisions of the Cape Supergroup. The Bokkeveld Group rocks are represented by the pale purple layer.

The Bokkeveld Group is the second of the three main subdivisions of the Cape Supergroup in South Africa. It overlies the Table Mountain Group and underlies the Witteberg Group. The Bokkeveld Group rocks are considered to range between Lower Devonian (Lochkovian) to Middle Devonian (Givetian) in age.

== Background ==
The Cape Supergroup rocks were deposited in a purely marine setting, within a 1,300 kilometres (810 mi) wide passive margin basin known as the Cape Basin. The rocks were deposited over a 170-million-year period ranging from approximately 485 Ma (Tremadocian) to the Early Carboniferous (about 330 Ma; late Mississippian). Up to 10 kilometres (33,000 ft) of strata were preserved throughout. The Cape Supergroup rocks later underwent deformation during the Cape orogeny, in which the rocks were folded and thrust upwards. The Cape orogeny formed the Cape Fold Belt and the mountains that range along the Cape and the southern parts of South Africa. An additional geological formation, the Msikaba Formation, found north of Port St. Johns in the Eastern Cape is considered to correlate with the Witteberg Group of the Cape Supergroup.

== Geographic extent ==
Bokkeveld Group outcrops and exposures range from the Breede River Valley in the west to Port Alfred near Grahamstown in the east. The group displays lateral continuity throughout the length of the Cape Fold Belt. The Msikaba Formation rocks appear north-northeast of Port St. Johns in the Eastern Cape.

== Stratigraphic units ==
The Bokkeveld Group is subdivided into three subgroups: the Ceres Subgroup and Bidouw Subgroup that are found West of 24ºE, and the Traka Subgroup found East of 24ºE. The Ceres Subgroup is found throughout the extent of the lower Bokkeveld Group exposures. The Bokkeveld Group contains five complete coarsening-upward cycles and is arranged into three distinctive facies arrangements represented by the subgroups. The geological formations are also distinguished by their sedimentology of alternating mudstone/siltstone and sandstones. The Bokkeveld Group subgroups and their respective geological formations are listed below (from oldest to youngest):

Ceres Subgroup:

- Gydo Formation: Composed mainly of mudrock and siltstone that contain minor sandstone layers. The rock sediments of the Gydo were deposited in low-energy, offshore-prodeltaic environments.
- Gamka Formation: Sandstone-rich in contrast to the Gydo, composed of fine to medium-grained feldspathic wacke, arenites and some subordinate mudstone. The sandstones are arranged in coarsening upward cycles - a greater geological feature seen in the Bokkeveld Group as a whole. Hummocky cross-bedding structures are frequently observed in this formation. The sandstones exhibit coarsening-upward cycles and hummocky cross-bedding. These features indicate that the depositional environment was a high-energy storm and wave reworked delta front or delta plain environment. The formation is abundant in invertebrate fossils, especially brachiopods.
- Voorstehoek Formation: Mudstone and siltstone. Same depositional environment as the lower Gydo Formation.
- Hex River Formation: Sandstones arranged in coarsening-upward sequences much like the Gamka Formation. Trace fossils of Planolites, Skolithos, and Arenicolites are found.
- Tra-Tra Formation: Mudstone and siltstone-rich.
- Boplaas Formation: Fine to medium-grained feldspathic wackes and arenites with minor shales and siltstone.

Bidouw Subgroup (West of 24ºE):

- Waboomberg Formation: Mudstone and siltstone interbedded with fine-grained sandstones.
- Wuppertal Formation: Fine to medium-grained sandstones and minor siltstones.
- Klipbokkop Formation: Shales and siltstones with subordinate fine-grained sandstone.
- Osberg Formation: Westernmost outcrops of this formation are dominated by sandstone.
- Karoopoort Formation: Shale and siltstone with some minor sandstone layers.

Traka Subgroup (East of 24ºE):

- Karies Formation: Dark-coloured shale and rhythmites are dominant. Deep marine (pelagic zone) depositional environment.
- Adolphspoort Formation: Dark, wavy-bedded siltstone and micaceous shales. Eastern correlate of the Osberg Formation.
- Sandpoort Formation: Reddish, lenticular bedded sandstones with minor mudstones. Plant fossils are common.

== Paleontology ==
The bulk of the fossils found in the Cape Supergroup are eroded fragments of benthic invertebrate Malvinokaffric fauna, particularly that of various brachiopods such as Australocoelia, Australospirifer, and chonetids. Crinoids are also found, although their dis-articulated ossicles are more common, as are trace fossils such as worm burrows and feeding trails left by other invertebrates. Rarer are fossils of trilobites, bivalves, cephalopods, gastropods, ophiuroids, hyoliths, echinoids, echinoderms, conulariids, cricoconarids, and corals.

In the upper Bidouw and Traka Subgroups, plant and trace fossils are more common than invertebrate fossils. Lycopods and trace fossils of Spirophyton have been recovered. Rare bony fish fossils have also been found, mainly of placoderm fishes, although placoderm fish are mainly known from rocks of the overlying Witteberg Group.
