= Geology of Cape Town =

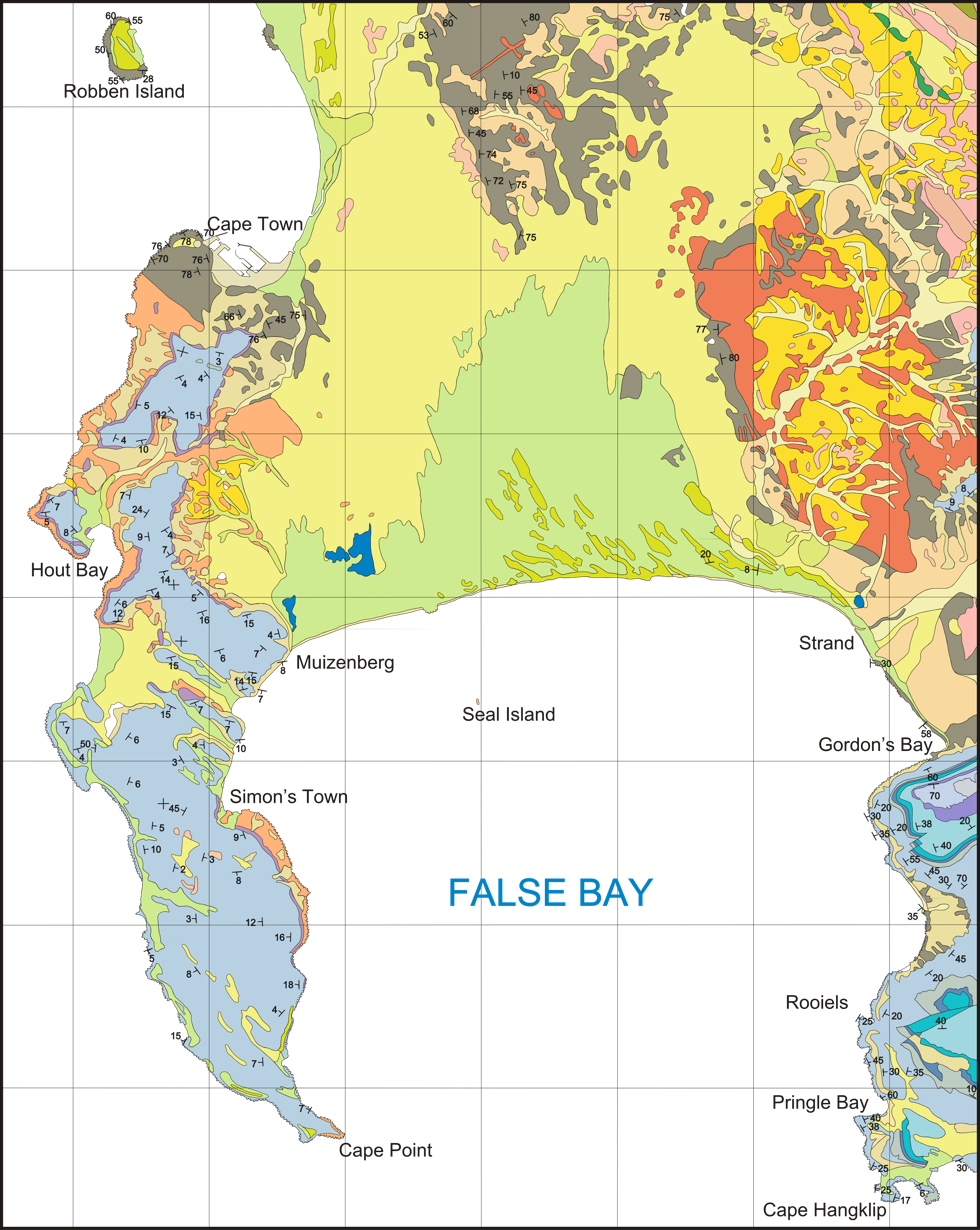
Geological map of the Cape Peninsula and False Bay

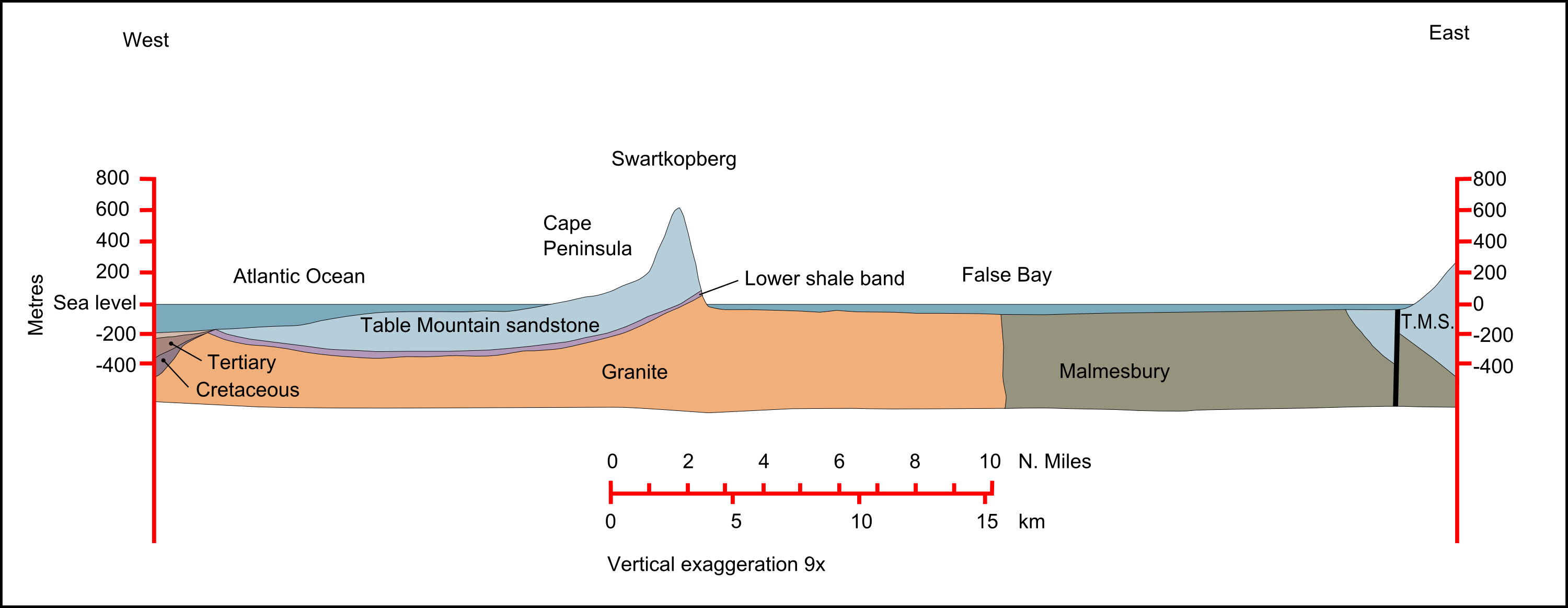
Geological section of the Cape Peninsula and False Bay

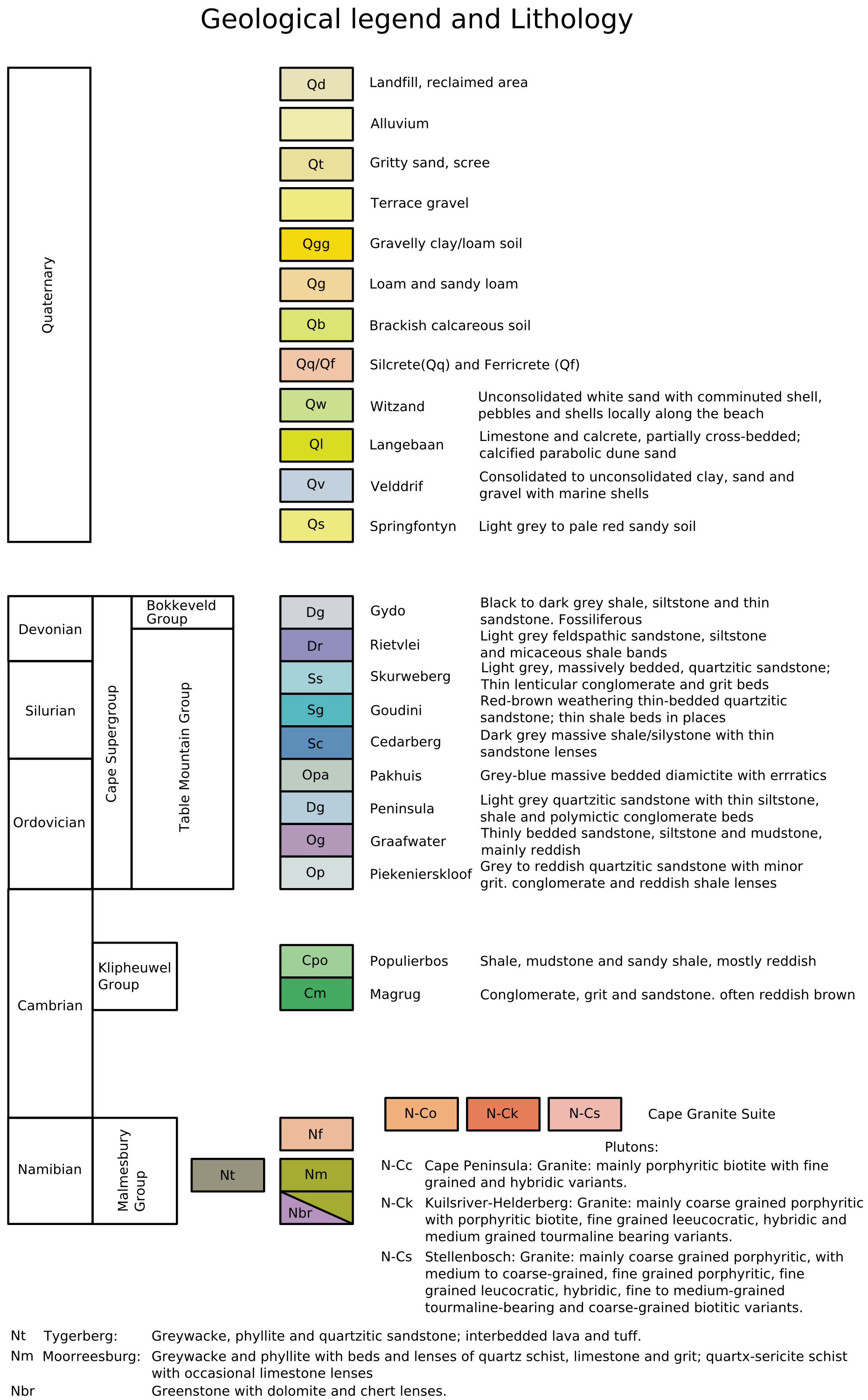

Cape Town lies at the south-western corner of the continent of Africa. It is bounded to the south and west by the Atlantic Ocean, and to the north and east by various other municipalities in the Western Cape province of South Africa.

The Cape Peninsula is a rocky and mountainous peninsula that juts out into the Atlantic Ocean at the south-western extremity of the continent. At its tip is Cape Point and the Cape of Good Hope. The peninsula forms the west side of False Bay and the Cape Flats. On the east side are the Helderberg and Hottentots Holland mountains. The three main rock formations are the late-Precambrian Malmesbury group (sedimentary and metamorphic rock), the Cape Granite suite, comprising the huge Peninsula, Kuilsriver-Helderberg, and Stellenbosch batholiths, that were intruded into the Malmesbury Group about 630 million years ago, and the Table Mountain group sandstones that were deposited on the eroded surface of the granite and Malmesbury series basement about 450 million years ago. The sand, silt and mud deposits were lithified by pressure and then folded during the Cape Orogeny to form the Cape Fold Belt, which extends along the western and southern coasts. The present landscape is due to prolonged erosion having carved out deep valleys, removing parts of the once continuous Table Mountain Group sandstone cover from the Cape Flats and False Bay, and leaving high residual mountain ridges.

At times the sea covered the Cape Flats and Noordhoek valley and the Cape Peninsula was then a group of islands. During glacial periods the sea level dropped to expose the bottom of False Bay to weathering and erosion, with the last major regression leaving the entire bottom of False Bay exposed. During this period an extensive system of dunes was formed on the sandy floor of False Bay. At this time the drainage outlets lay between Rocky Bank Cape Point to the west, and between Rocky Bank and Hangklip Ridge to the east.

== The geological structure of the region ==
=== Malmesbury group deposition ===
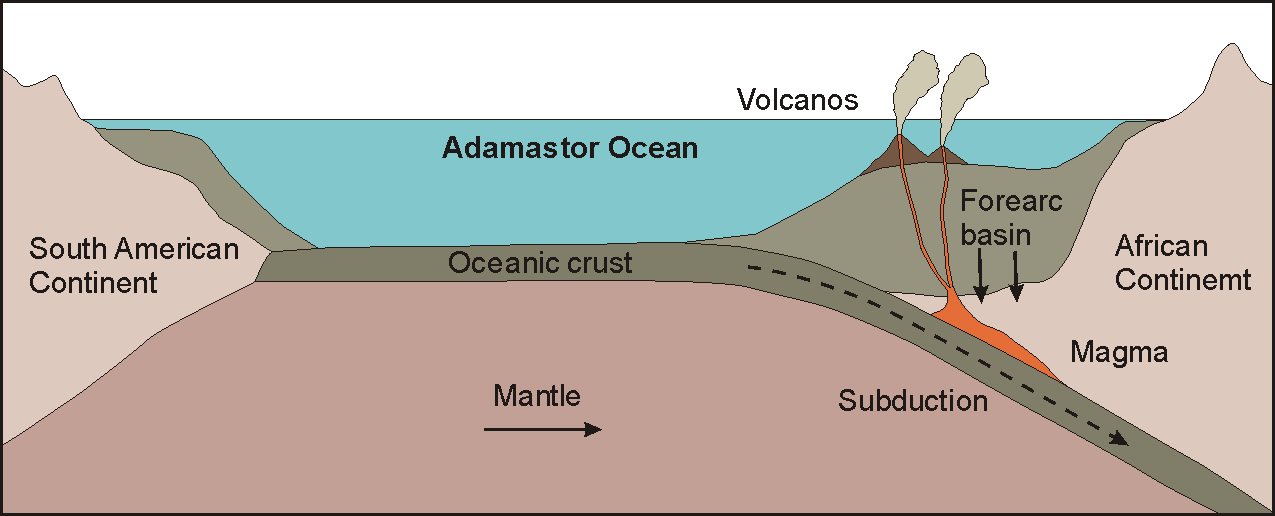
Possible tectonic setting during deposition of the Malmesbury group. (after Compton 2004)

The late-Precambrian age Malmesbury Group is the oldest rock formation in the area, consisting of alternating layers of dark grey fine-grained greywacke, sandstone and slate, seen along the rocky Sea Point and Bloubergstrand shorelines, and from the Strand to Gordon's Bay. These sediments were originally deposited on an ancient continental slope by submarine slumping and turbidity currents. The sequence was subsequently metamorphosed by heat and pressure and folded tightly in a NW direction during the Saldanian orogeny so that the rock layers are now almost vertical. These rocks were, in most places, scoured by wave action during past periods of higher sea level.

==== Appearance of the exposed Malmesbury group rocks ====
Most of the exposed shoreline Malmesbury rocks are steeply dipped, and weathered to form sharp edged ridges where more resistant layers stand out among the softer strata. The rocks are generally dark in colour where fresh rock has been exposed by erosion, and may be finely laminated.

==== Coastal areas where Malmesbury group rocks are exposed ====
- Robben Island
- Green Point to Sea Point
- Gordon's Bay
- Blousteen (between Koeelbay and Rooi-els)
- Grotto Bay

=== Cape granite intrusion ===
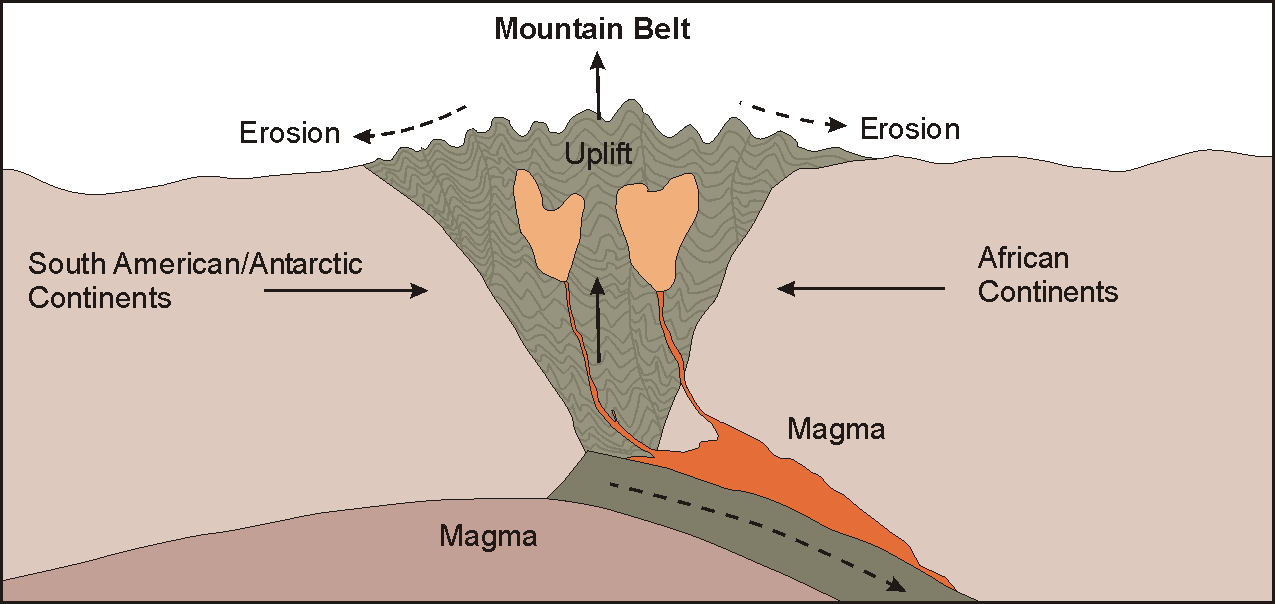
Granitic magma intruded into the Malmesbury rocks as the ancient Adamastor ocean closed up and the South American and Antarctic continents collided with Africa. The collision resulted in uplift and deformation of the Malmesbury sediments. Later erosion exposed the granite at the surface. (after Compton 2004)

The Cape Granite suite is three huge batholiths that were intruded into the Malmesbury Group about 630 million years ago as molten rock and crystallised deep in the earth, but have since then been exposed by prolonged erosion. The Peninsula batholith underlies the Cape Peninsula and the west side of False Bay, The Kuilsrivier-Helderberg batholith is to the northeast and the Stellenbosch batholith a bit further to the north. The characteristic spheroidal shapes of granite boulders are a result of preferential weathering along intersecting fractures and are well displayed around Llandudno and Simonstown. Close up, the granite is a coarse-grained rock consisting of large (2–5 cm) white or pink feldspar crystals, glassy brown quartz and flakes of black mica, and containing inclusions of dark Malmesbury hornfels near the contact zone.

The climate of this region was warmer and wetter in the Cretaceous. This led to severe chemical weathering of the granite to saprolite rich in kaolin clays, decomposed from the large visible crystals of potassium feldspar that are so conspicuous in the granite.

The contact zone where the Malmesbury Group was intruded by molten granite can be seen at Sea Point and was made famous by Charles Darwin during his voyage of scientific discovery on H.M.S. Beagle in 1844. Here, slivers of dark coloured Malmesbury rocks, altered by intense heat are intermingled and folded with the pale coloured intrusive granite to form a complex mixed rock. Large feldspar crystals occur in both the granite and dark hornfels layers

Though initially intruded at great depth, prolonged erosion eventually exposed the granite at the surface and it and what remains of the similarly eroded Malmesbury group now form a basement upon which younger sedimentary rocks of the Table Mountain Group were deposited.

Other large granite plutons of similar age are found in the Western Cape, but none of the others extend to the coastline in this area. The Stellenbosch pluton extends under the Helderberg and Hottentots Holland mountains. Cape Blue Rock, a dense Hornfels, was formed from the Malmesbury series rock by the Stellenbosch pluton, and was quarried as a building aggregate near Sir Lowry's Pass. The Blue Rock Quarry has been closed and is now flooded and used for water sports including diving and water skiing.

==== Appearance of the exposed Peninsula Granites ====
Almost all the exposed granite has been extensively weathered and is in the form of rounded corestones. The colour is generally pale to medium grey, and the surface is typically fairly rough, with clearly visible crystals, and no layered structure. As an intrusive rock, dip and strike do not apply, but the massive rock is cracked on jointing planes, which tend to be characteristic of the location, and weathering has accentuated these joints. The general direction and spacing of joints in some areas is fairly consistent over quite large areas, and the underwater landscape is often a continuation of the general trends above the surface, which can be useful for underwater navigational purposes.

==== Coastal and offshore areas where Peninsula Granite rocks are exposed ====
- Sea Point to Chapman's Peak
- Simon's Town harbour to Partridge Point
- Roman Rock and adjacent reefs
- Cape Point
- Bellows Rock (off Cape Point)
- Seal Island (False Bay)
- Whittle Rock (offshore reef in False Bay)

=== Table Mountain Group deposition ===
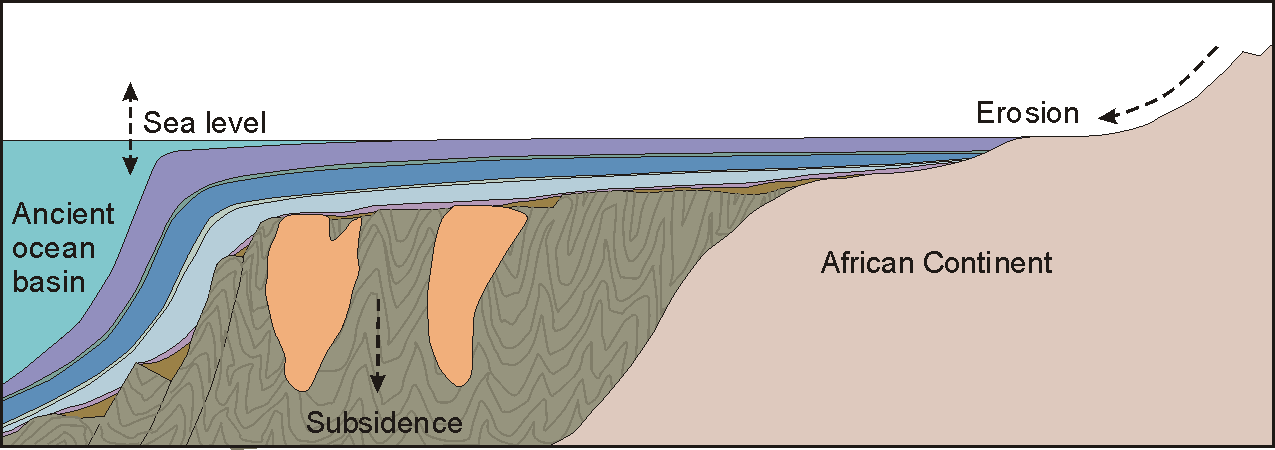
Deposition of the Cape Supergroup on the flat eroded surface of granite-intruded Malmesbury rocks. Alternating deposition of sandstone and shale reflects changes in relative sea level along an overall subsiding, passive continental margin. (after Compton 2004)

Table Mountain group sandstones were deposited on the eroded surface of granite and Malmesbury series basement, in the stream channels and tidal flats of a coastal plain and delta environment that extended across the region about 450 million years ago. The sand, silt and mud deposits were lithified by pressure and then folded during the Cape Orogeny to form the Cape Fold Belt, which extends along the western and southern coasts.

The basal Graafwater Formation (300-450m thick) consists of interlayered pale brown sandstone, laminated pink siltstone and dark maroon coloured shale. Closer examination shows deposition cycles from current-bedded channel sandstones to increasing proportions of fine-grained maroon shales at the top, deposited in flood plains and lagoons.

The Peninsula Formation (800-1500m thick) consisting of hard, light grey medium to coarse grained pebbly quartz sandstone, dominates the steep mountain cliffs. Current bedding and pebble layers suggest that it was originally deposited as migrating sand bars in broad river channels.

The Pakhuis Formation tillite (a lithified glacial outwash gravel) occurs on the highest point of Table Mountain, at Maclear's Beacon and on parts of the Hottentots-Holland range. It contains clusters of angular boulders and pebbles and was deposited at a time when the Gondwana continent, of which Africa was a part, was situated close to the south pole.

Graafwater, Peninsula and Pakhuis formations are from the Ordovician period.

Cederberg, Goudini and Skurweberg Formations from the Silurian period, and Rietvlei Formation from the Devonian period complete the Table Mountain group, and are found in the Hottentots Holland mountains to the East of False Bay. These strata are all well above the present sea level in the Cape Town area.

The Cederberg Formation includes dark grey siltstone and silty sandstones, and is darker than the overlying Goudini Formation which is light brown to light grey quartzitic sandstone, with interbedded reddish brown siltstone and shale. The Goudini formation is more feldspathic and finer grained than the Skurweberg Formation, which is characterised by fairly thick bedded medium to coarse grained, light grey, slightly feldspathic quartzose sandstone.

The Rietvlei Formation consists of alternating horizons of light grey quartzose and feldspathic sandstone, siltstone and shale.

=== Cape orogeny ===
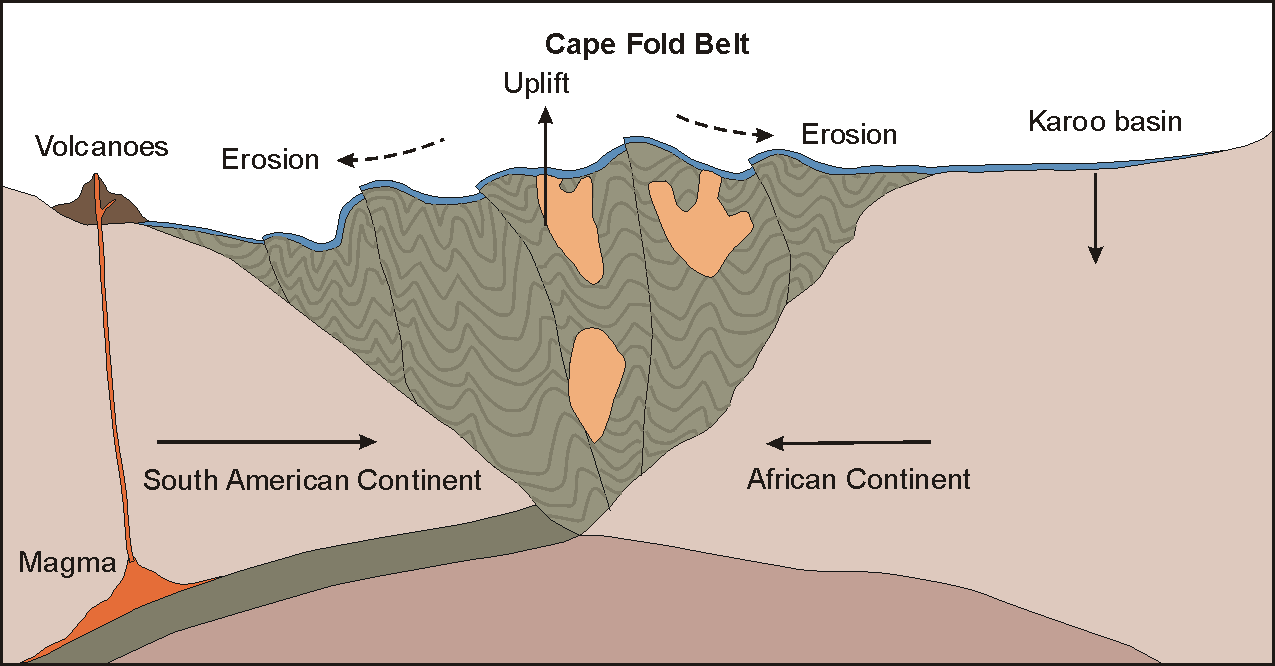
The Cape Fold belt formed during a major mountain-building episode as the continents collided to form Pangaea. Volcanic ash deposits in the Karoo basin indicate the presence of active subduction zones to the west and south as the South American and Antarctic plates crumple the Cape Supergroup and its underlying strata into the Cape Fold Belt Mountains. (after Compton 2004)

The formation of the Cape Fold Belt is the result of a collision of tectonic plates that ended over 200 million years ago The accumulated strata of the Cape Supergroup and the older granites and Malmesbury group were raised and deformed by the pressure of the South American, Antarctic and African continental plates slowly moving together. The resulting fold mountains have been eroded to their present state over the ensuing period, and what exists today are the remnants of a much larger and higher mountain chain. Faults cut across and displace the rock layers. These more easily eroded zones are marked by ravines; cross-cutting faults separate multiple peaks of the Twelve Apostles. Some fault zones of crushed rock (breccia) are re-cemented by dark brown coloured iron and manganese oxide minerals.

Possible evolution of the Cape Town landscape: The nearly horizontal Table Mountain sandstones represent the trough and the steeply dipping sandstones of the same formations of the Hottentots Holland Mountains to the east the limb of a large fold that has since eroded away to expose the underlying shale. Thus the modern landscape may represent an inverted version of an earlier landscape (dashed lines) characterised by a large mountain where the Cape Flats are now. (after Compton 2004)

The present landscape is due to prolonged erosion having carved out deep valleys, removing parts of the once continuous Table Mountain Group sandstone cover from the Cape Flats and leaving high residual mountain ridges in an example of inverted relief.

==== Appearance of the exposed Table Mountain sandstones ====
Strike and dip vary considerably: on the Cape Peninsula dip is generally near to horizontal, so there are ledges rather than ridges, but on the east side of False Bay the dip is steep, often more than 45°, and where the strike is parallel to the shoreline (near Gordon's Bay and Rooi-els), this results in underwater ridges and gulleys also parallel to the shoreline, and usually interrupted by transverse gullies which are extensions of gullies extending above the water. In other places the ridges are at a greater angle to the shoreline.

The offshore reef at Steenbras Deep is relatively flat topped, the strike is roughly north–south and dip is quite steep.

The extensive shoal at Rocky Bank is relatively flat topped, with steps, and here the dip is fairly flat.

==== Coastal and offshore areas where Table Mountain Group rocks are exposed ====
- Noordhoek to Cape Point
- Smitswinkel Bay to Cape Point
- Simon's Town to Muizenberg
- Gordon's Bay to Koeelbay
- Rooi-els to Cape Hangklip
- Rocky Bank (offshore reef in mouth of False Bay)

The origin of the hard sedimentary rocks of the ridges at Steenbras Deep, East Shoal and York shoal have not been identified. The pre-erosion section proposed by Compton suggests that these outcrops are likely to be from the basal Malmesbury group.

=== Tertiary to Recent events ===
Almost 50% of the Cape Peninsula and Cape Flats area is covered by weakly cemented marine sands. Sea-levels fluctuated between −120 and +200m from present mean sea level during the Pliocene and subsequent Pleistocene ice-age between 2 million and 15000 years ago as a result of fluctuating global temperature and variable amounts of water accumulated in polar ice caps.

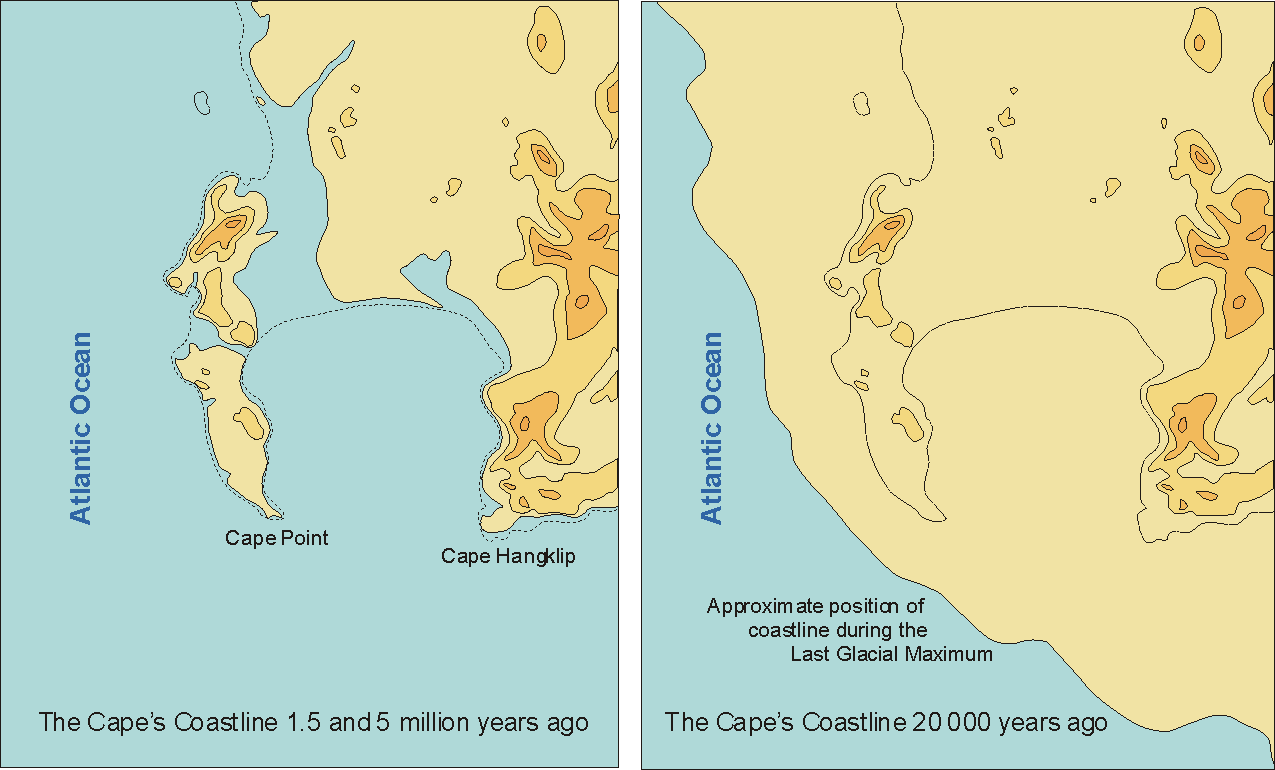
The Cape Peninsula shoreline in the case of (left) a 25m higher sea level that occurred around 5 and 1.5 million years ago, and (right) a 125m lower sea level at the time of maximum ice build-up during cold periods – the most recent being 20 000 years ago (after John S. Compton 2004)

At times the sea covered the Cape Flats and Noordhoek valley and the Cape Peninsula was then a group of islands. Beach sands with shell fragments and estuarine muds were deposited and later overlain by calcrete-cemented dune sands as the sea retreated. "Dune rock" that was deposited during a Pleistocene interglacial period about 120,000 years ago is now being eroded in the sea-cliffs near Swartklip.

During glacial periods the sea level dropped to expose the bottom of False Bay to weathering and erosion. The last major regression, about 20,000 years ago, lowered the sea level to the present 130m isobath, which is south of Cape Point and Cape Hangklip, leaving the entire bottom of False Bay exposed. During this period an extensive system of dunes was formed on the sandy floor of False Bay. The southward extensions of the now-buried Tertiary drainage must run east of Seal island, York Shoal and East Shoal in the north-central part of False Bay, and then down its central bathymetric deep axis towards the outlet between the submerged features of Rocky Bank and Hangklip Ridge.

==== Bottom sediments ====
The bottom off the west coast of the cape Peninsula between and beyond the rocky reef areas is largely fairly fine white quartzitic sand with some areas of coarser shelly sand.

The bottom sediments of False Bay are more varied. On the west side of the bay there is a general tendency towards fine to medium quartzitic sand and coarser calcareous material, mostly mollusc shell fragments, with patches of a maerl of branching coralline algae fragments. There are also areas of very fine sand, almost mud, in the more sheltered Simon's Bay.

The east side of False Bay also has extensive areas of fine quartzitic sand bottom, and there are also occasional deposits of a very fine low density silty material which is easily disturbed and returned to suspension. This silt generally deposits over the sand and depressions in the reef during relatively long periods of calm seas. There are small areas of shelly gravel and mud near Gordon's Bay between the rocky shoreline reef and the sand bottom.

=== Marine terraces ===
Gravel beds underlying raised-beach terraces occur intermittently along most of the coastline. Boulder beds are found almost continuously from Kommetjie southwards to Cape Point. They rest on a terrace, 7 to 10 m above sea level, which cuts into Table Mountain Sandstone. There are indications of an older raised pebble beach at 17 to 20 m here as well.

Along the False Bay coast evidence of higher stands of the sea is presented by wave cut platforms, benches, boulder-beach ridges, sea cliffs, caves and undercut ledges Wave cut caves, indicating former sea level stands between +4 and +8 m are found between Cape Point and Muizenberg at Rooikrans, Batsata cove, Blaasbalkgrot and Hell's Gate, among others. Even more spectacular wave-cut caves occur on the Eastern side of False Bay from Gordon's Bay to Pringle Bay, e.g. at Die Kamer, Sandgat, Heuningkloof, Koeëlbaai, Blousteen, Rooiels and Drostersgat.

Wave cut platforms at 18 to 20 m and at 30 m are well developed below Clarence Drive from Steenbras River Mouth to Koeëlbaai. On them rest rounded sandstone boulders, gravel and sand, up to a metre thick, often cemented by manganese and iron. In places scree partially overlies these deposits. In the same vicinity raised boulder beaches, similar to those on the peninsula, occur at 3 to 5 m above sea level.

=== Intrusive rocks ===
==== Agglomerate and basaltic rocks ====
On the False Bay coast just below the old lighthouse at Cape Point, a basic agglomerate plug intrudes course grained porphyritic granite. This outcrop is unconformably overlain by sediments of the Table Mountain group. It consists of a heterogeneous mass of dark green to grey basic rock with red-brown specks that enclose randomly oriented clasts of variable size up to 300 mm. The clasts consist of rounded and angular quartzose sandstone, siltstone, hornfels, porphyritic granite, basic rocks and fine-grained reddish granite. Basic dykes of similar lithology to the matrix of the plug, cut both agglomerate and adjacent granite

==== Dolerite dykes ====
There are a number of dolerite dykes in the region, some of which are visible at the coast. These dykes are intrusive to the Cape Granite Suite and pre-Cape sedimentary rocks, and in some places also the Graafwater and Peninsula formations. They vary in width from a fraction of a metre to as much as 22 m at Logies Bay, Llandudno.

Most of the dolerites are fine to medium grained, dark grey rocks with augite and plagioclase as major constituents. Quartz enriched variations of dolerite are found at Miller's Point, Llandudno and Chapman's Peak.

== Recent climate ==
Over the last 2 million years of the Quaternary geological period, cool glacial periods (hypothermals) about 100,000 years long, have been the norm. Canada and northern Eurasia were covered by continental ice sheets kilometres thick, and the global effect was a lowering of sea level by some 130m because the sea was the source of the frozen water of these huge ice sheets. This means that False Bay and Table Bay were dry and covered by dunes for 90% of the last 2 million years. Warm interglacial periods (hyperthermals), have lasted only about 10 000 years and we are part way through the latest one which started about 6000 years ago. The coastline of False Bay, therefore, was usually across the mouth of the present False Bay. Robben Island was a hill on a coastal plain with the coast west of the island for most of the past 2 million years.

== Gallery ==
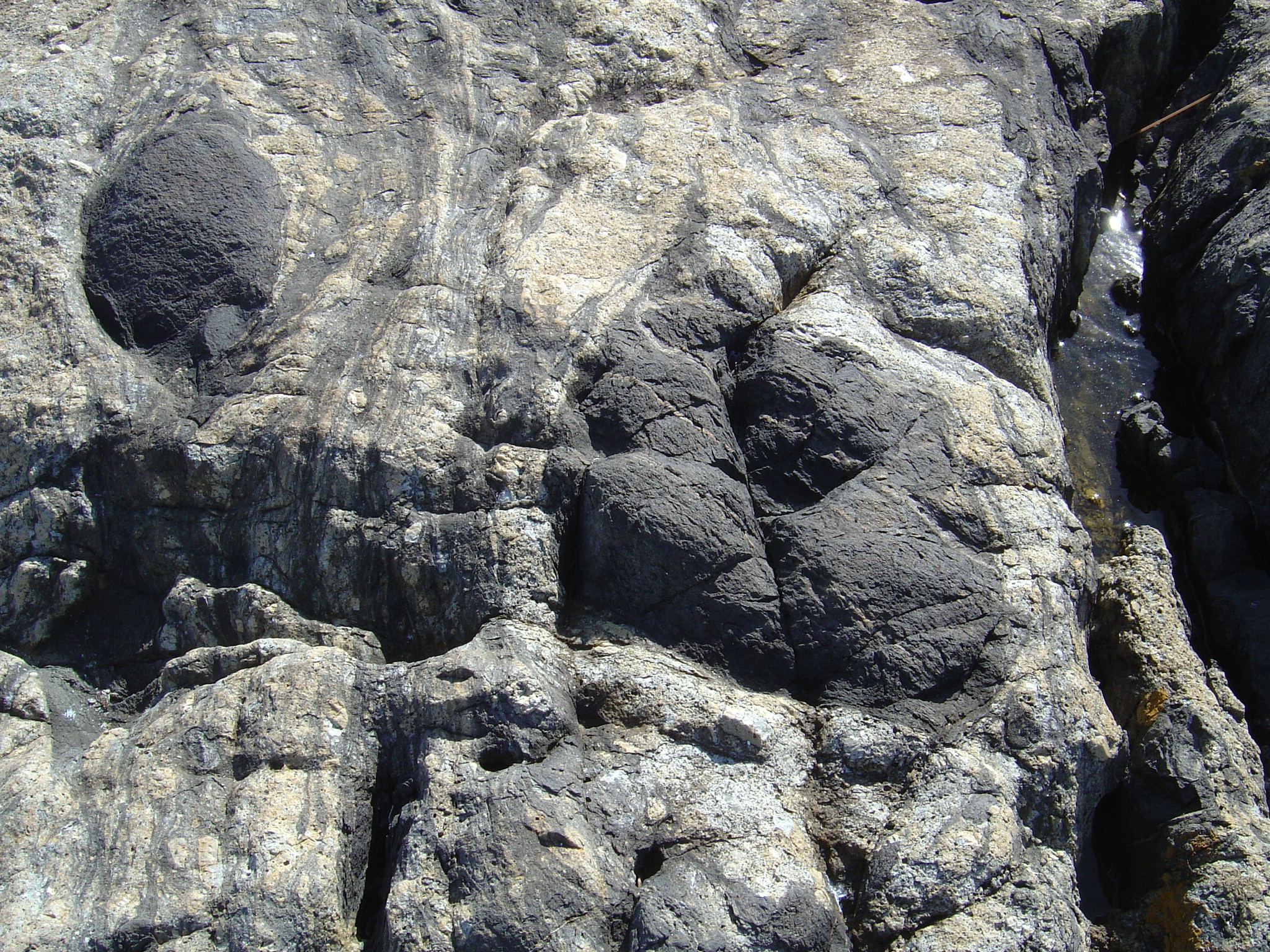
Sea Point contact zone

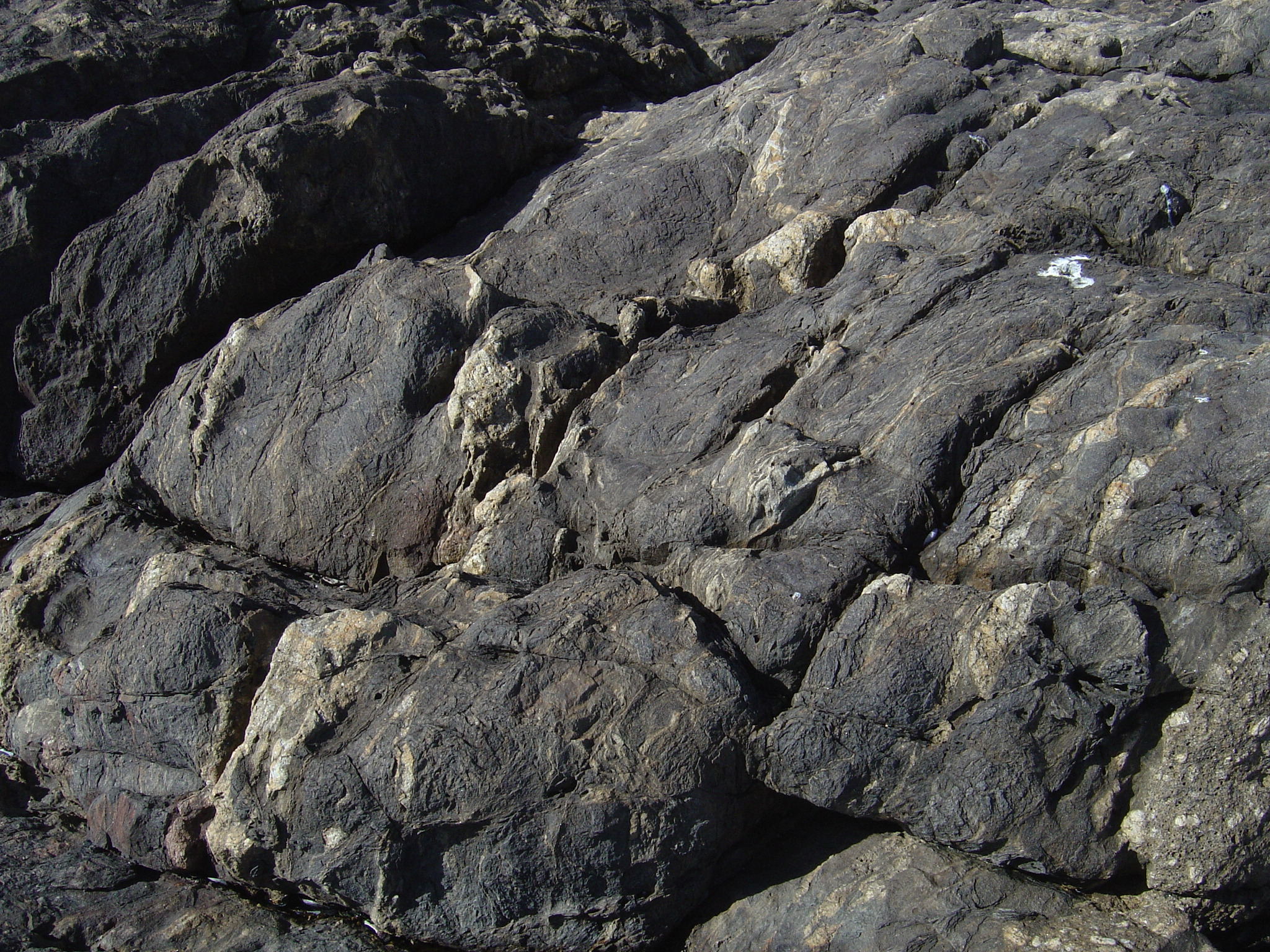
Sea Point contact zone Tygerberg sedimentary rock contact metamorhosed with small granitic inclusions

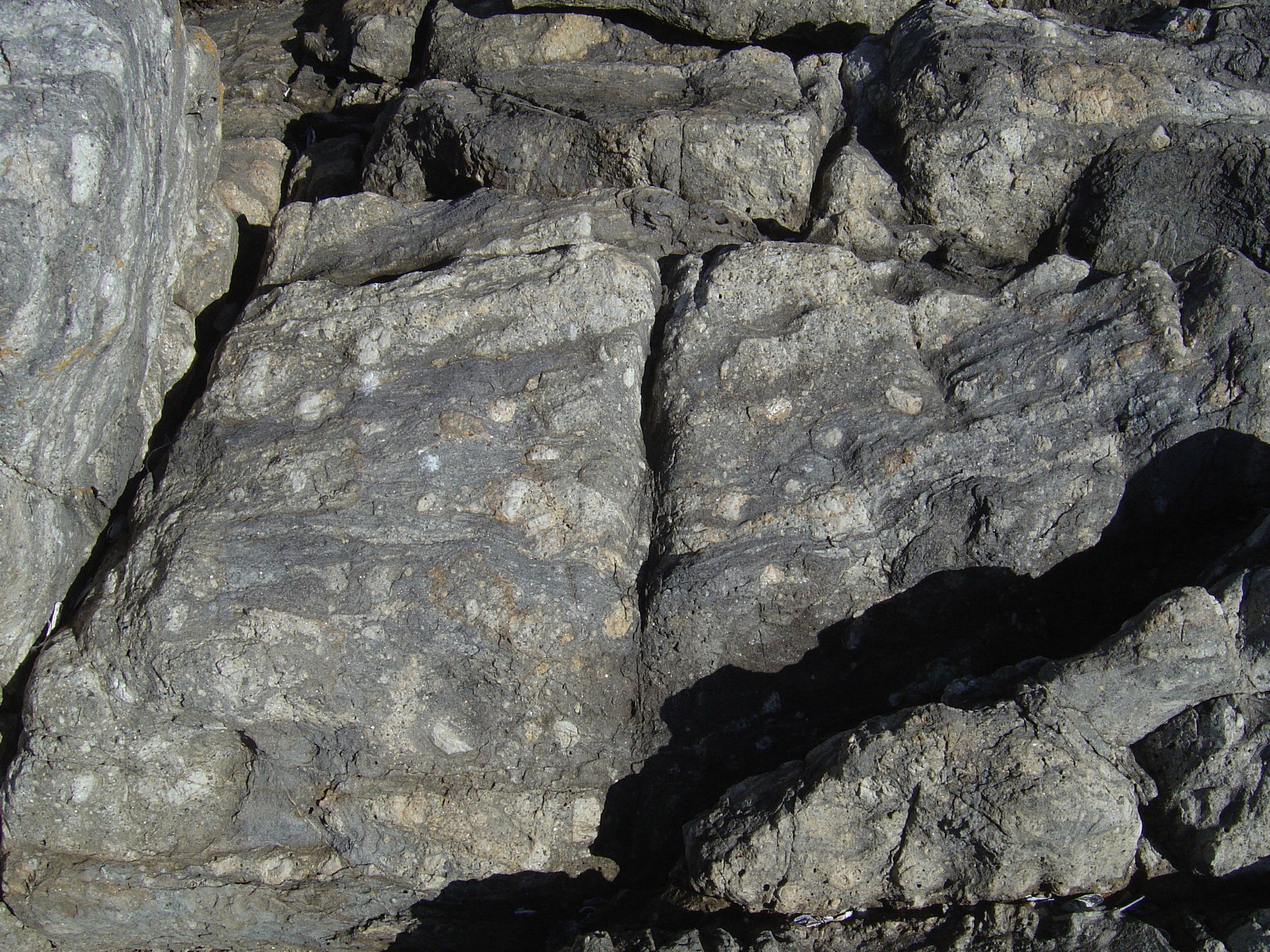
Sea Point contact zone mixed rocks

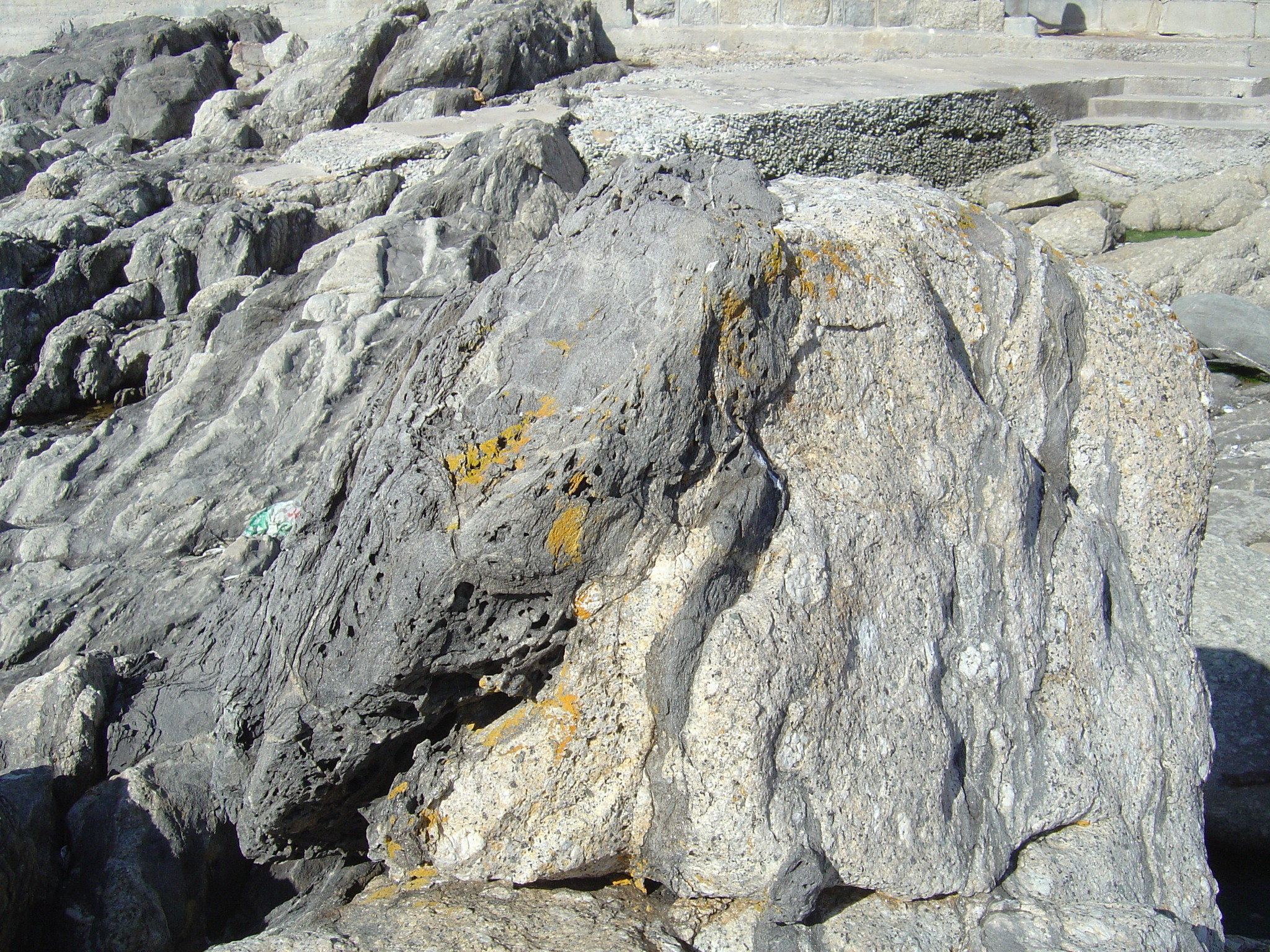
Sea point contact zone mixed rocks

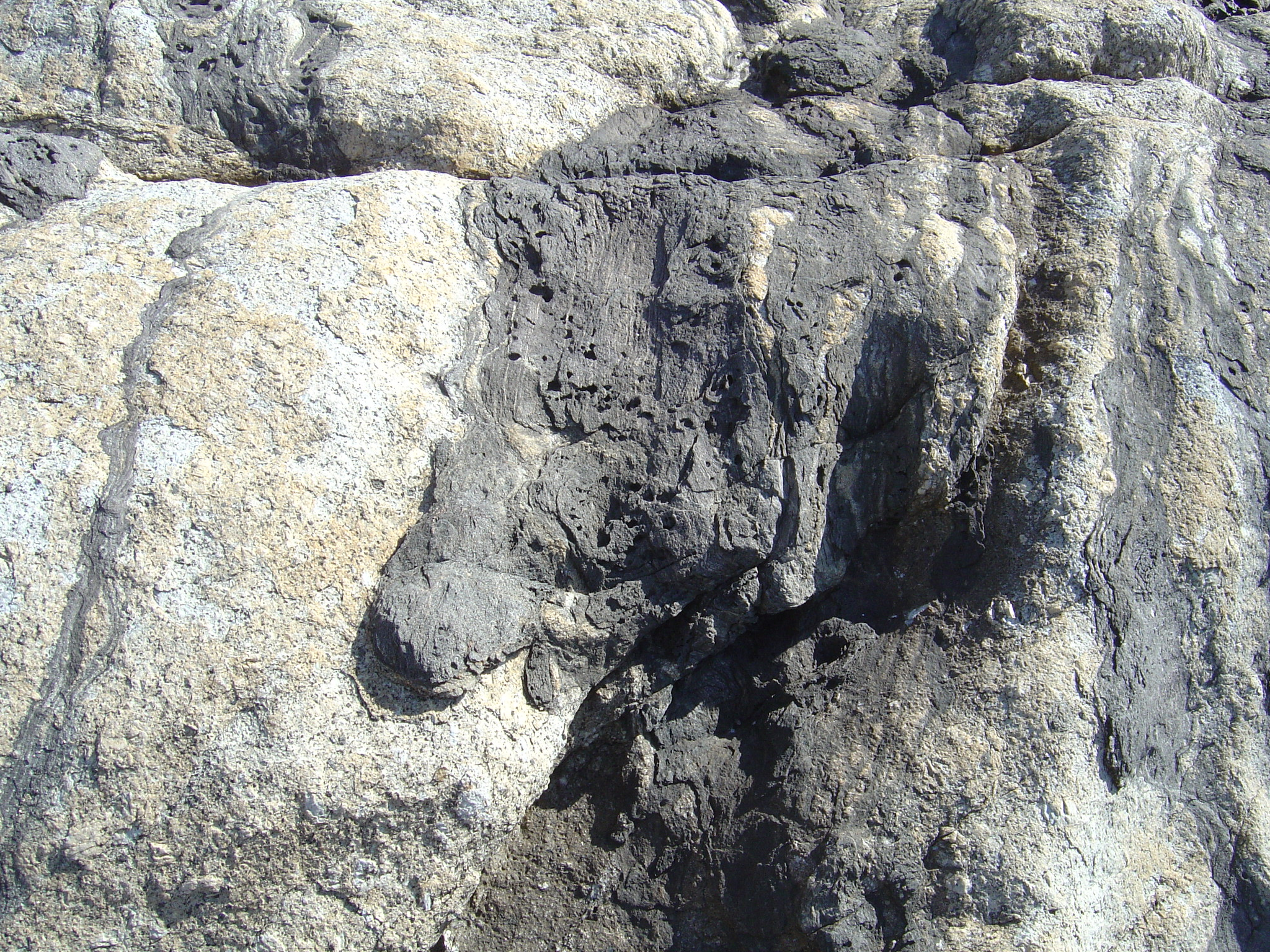
Sea Point contact zone mixed rocks

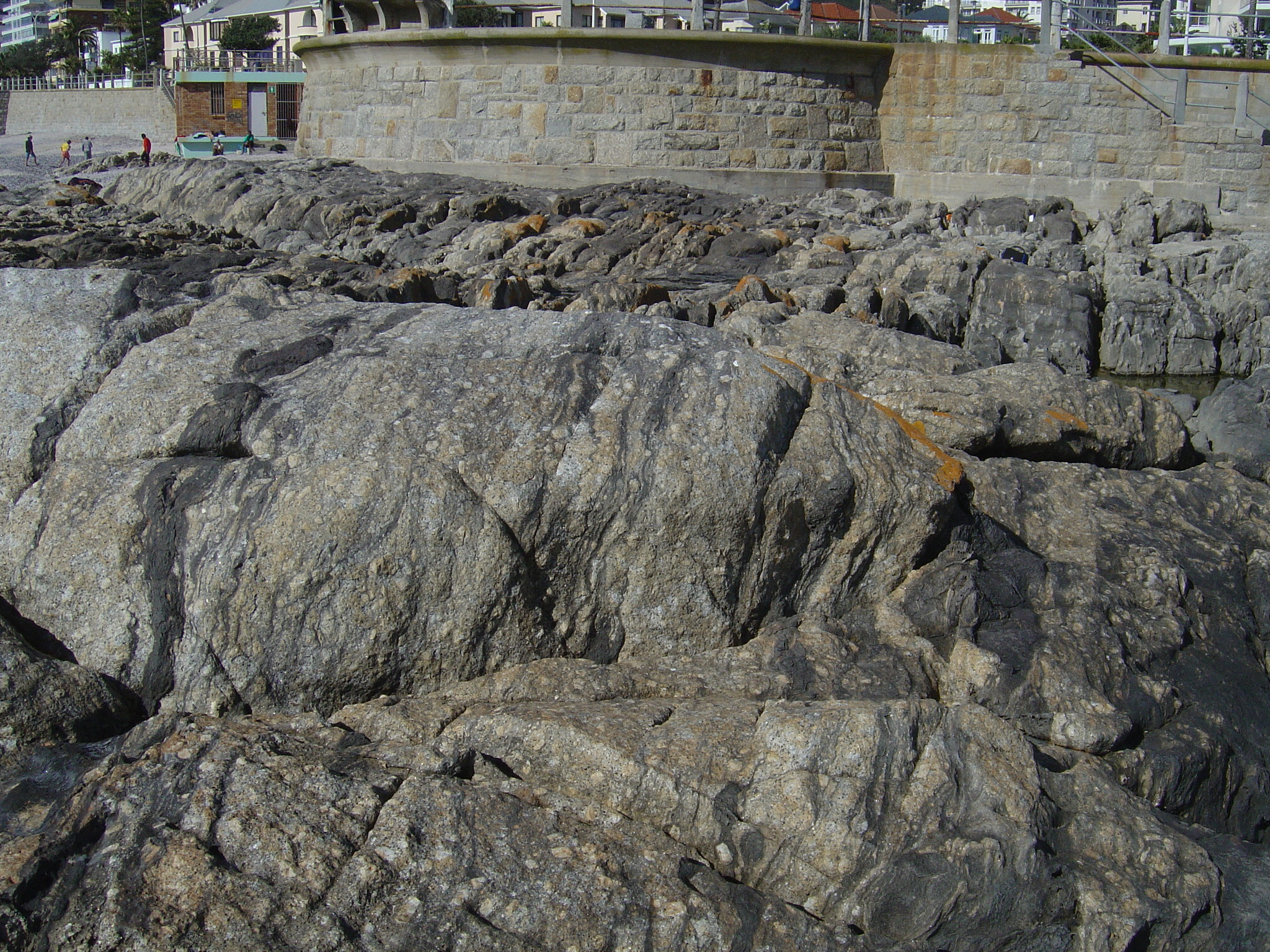
Sea Point contact zone mixed rocks

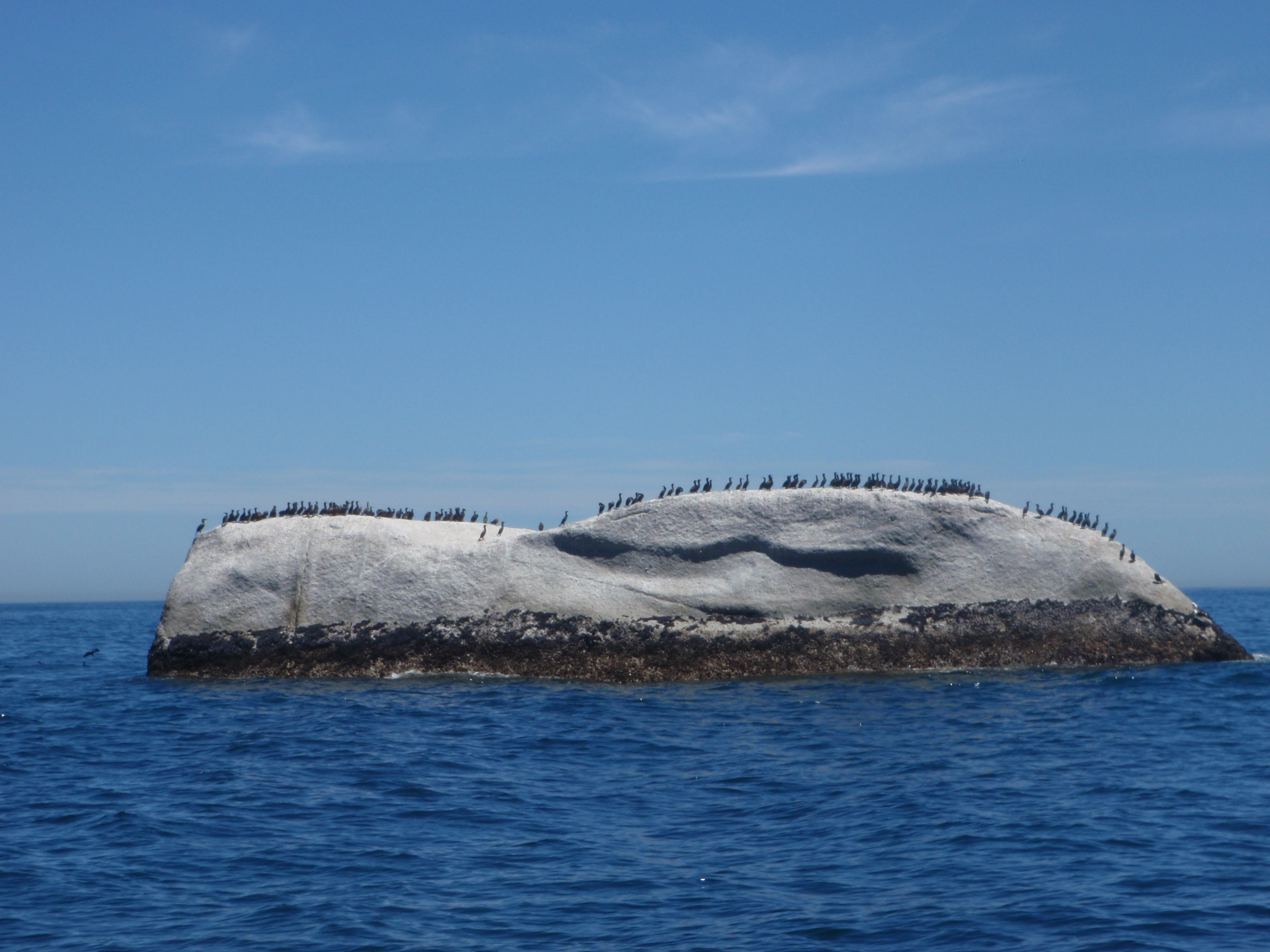
Peninsula Granite corestone rock known as Die Perd, off Duiker Point, near Hout Bay

== See also ==
- List of marine animals of the Cape Peninsula and False Bay
- List of seaweeds of the Cape Peninsula and False Bay
- Cape Fold Mountains
