= Cape Fold Belt =

Paleozoic fold and thrust belt in South Africa

Coordinates: 33.4°S 22°E

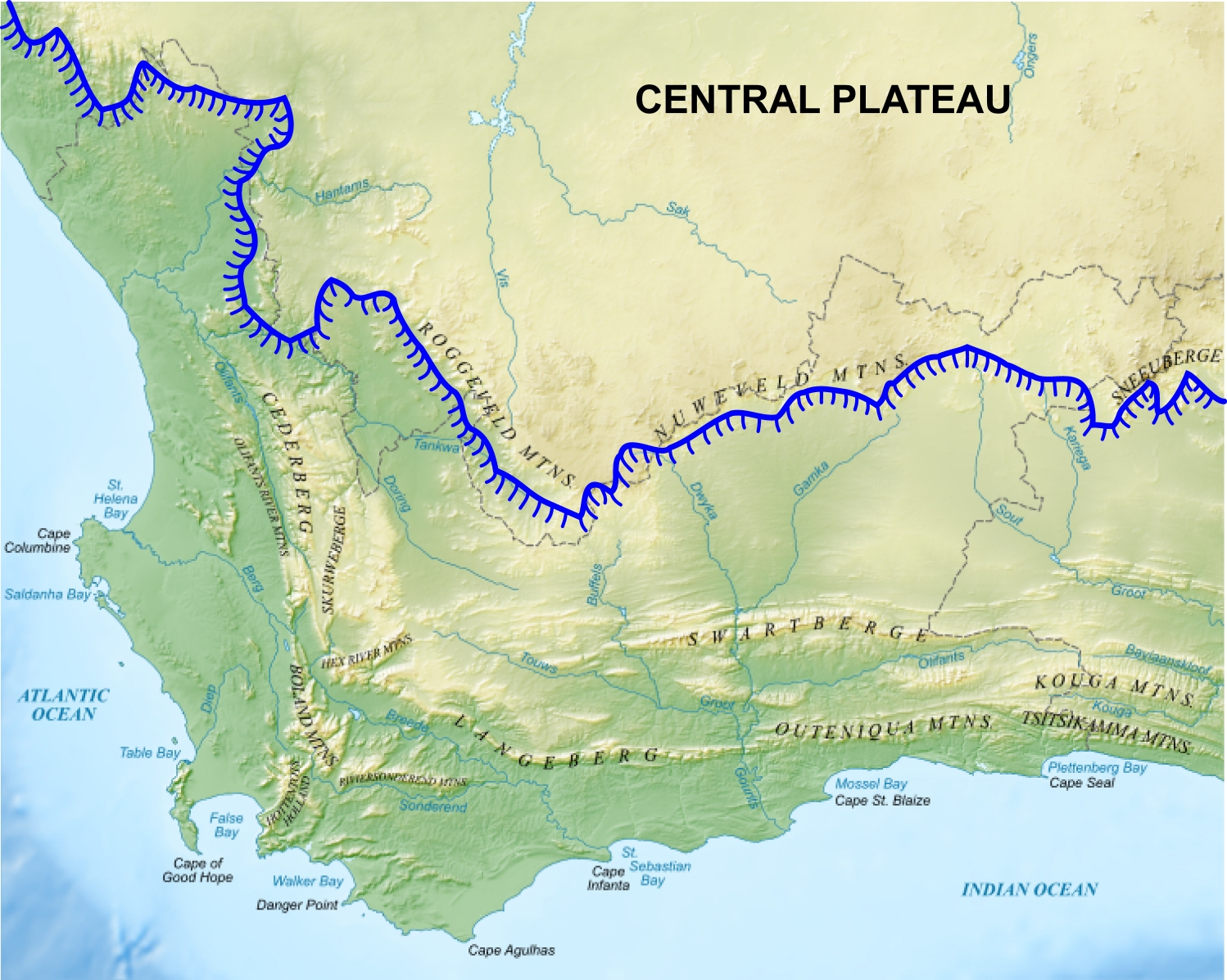
Map of the Western Cape, showing the main Cape Fold Mountain ranges. The Cape Fold belt is not part of the Great Escarpment shown in blue: the Roggeveld, Nuweveld and Sneeuberg "mountains". They are geographically and geologically distinct from the Cape Fold Mountains. The remaining named mountain ranges, to the south and southwest of the Escarpment, are all part of the Cape Fold Belt, which extends to the east as far as Port Elizabeth, about 150 km beyond the right-hand edge of the map.

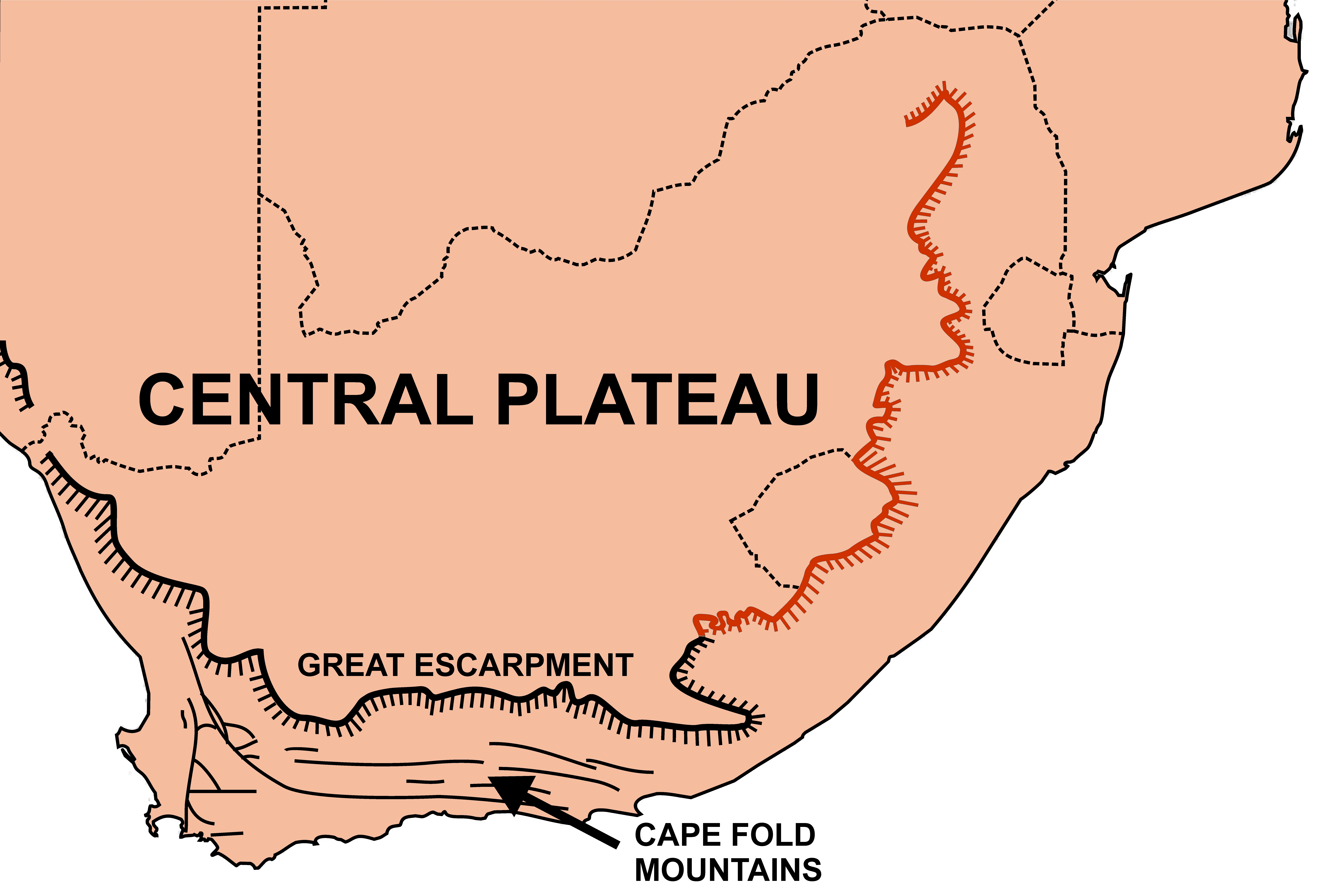
A map of South Africa showing the central plateau edged by the Great Escarpment and its relationship to the Cape Fold Mountains in the south. The portion of the Great Escarpment shown in red is known as the Drakensberg.

The Cape Fold Belt (CFB) is a 1,300 kilometres (810 mi) long fold-and-thrust mountain belt along the western and southern coastlines of Western Cape, South Africa. The Cape Fold Belt formed during the Permian period (300 to 250 million years ago) in the late Paleozoic age, affecting the sequence of sedimentary rock layers of the siliciclastic Cape Supergroup with folding and faulted rocks, which were deposited in the Cape Basin in the southwestern corner of South Africa.

The Cape Fold Belt was once part of a larger orogenic belt with other mountain ranges that formed as part of the same tectonic event that originally extended from Argentina, across southern Africa, and into Antarctica. It included the Ventana Mountains near Bahía Blanca in Argentina, the Pensacola Mountains in East Antarctica, the Ellsworth Mountains in West Antarctica, and the Hunter–Bowen orogeny in eastern Australia. The rocks involved in this fold system are primarily sandstones and shales, with shales from the Bokkeveld Group persisting in valley floors, while the more erosion-resistant sandstones of the Peninsula Formation form the parallel ranges of the Cape Fold Mountains. The highest peak in the range is Seweweekspoortpiek, which reaches 2,325 meters.

The Cape Fold Mountains form a series of parallel ranges that run along the south-western and southern coastlines of South Africa for 850 km from the Cederberg 200 km to the north of the Cape Peninsula, and then along the south coast as far as Port Elizabeth, 650 km to the east (see the two maps one above the other on the right).

== Geological origin ==
A timeline of the earth's geological history, with an emphasis on events in Southern Africa. The yellow block labeled C indicates when the Cape Supergroup was deposited, in relation to the Karoo Supergroup, K, immediately after it. The W indicates when the Witwatersrand Supergroup was laid down, very much further in the past. The graph also indicates the period during which banded ironstone formations were formed on Earth, indicative of an oxygen-free atmosphere. The Earth's crust was wholly or partially molten during the Hadean Eon; the oldest rocks on Earth are therefore less than 4000 million years old. One of the first microcontinents to form was the Kaapvaal craton, which forms the foundation of the north-eastern part of the country. The assembly and break-up of Gondwana are, in terms of the Earth's and South Africa's geological history, relatively recent events.

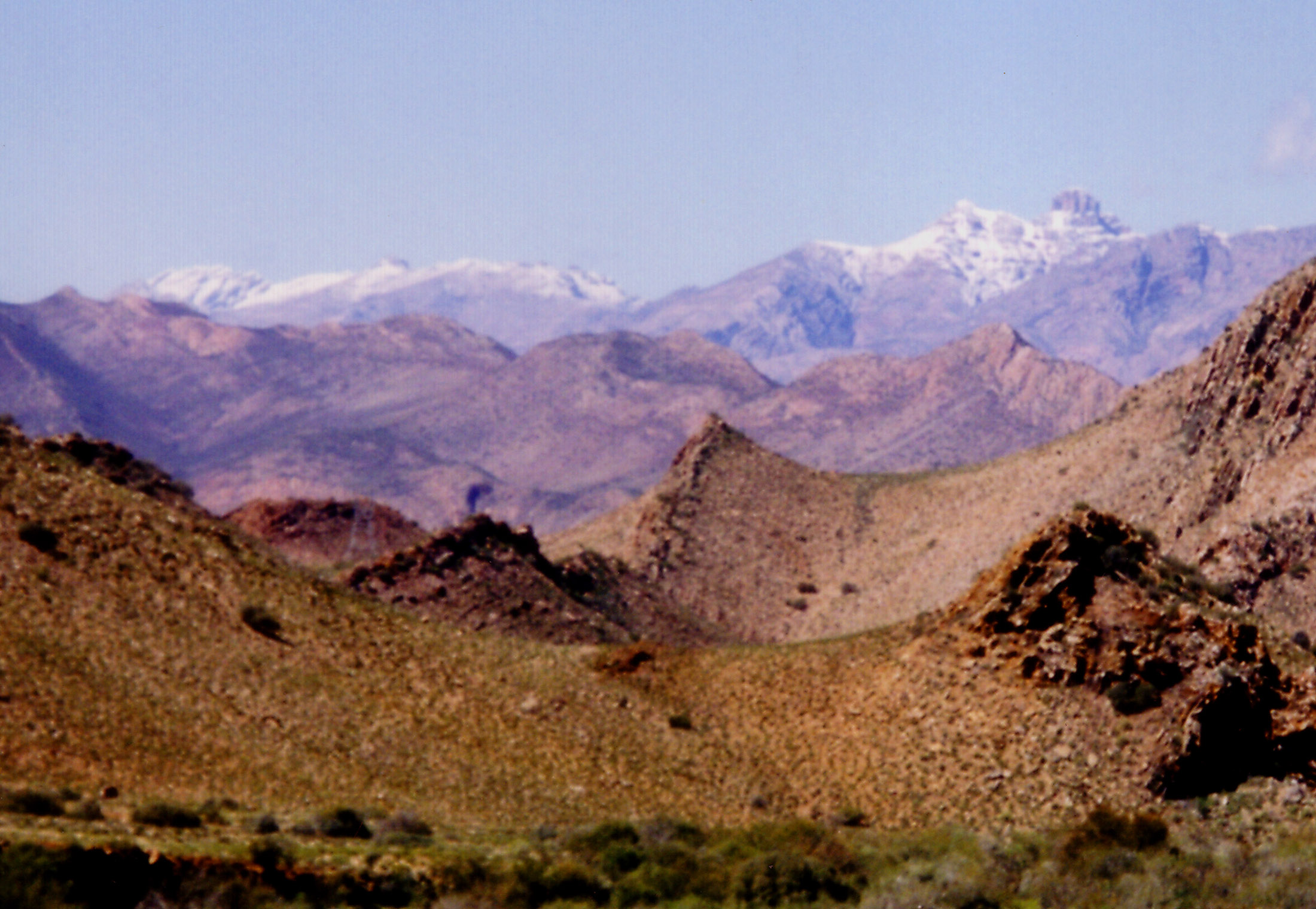
Klein Swartberg Range, seen from the Laingsburg area

Folded rock formations of the Swartberg

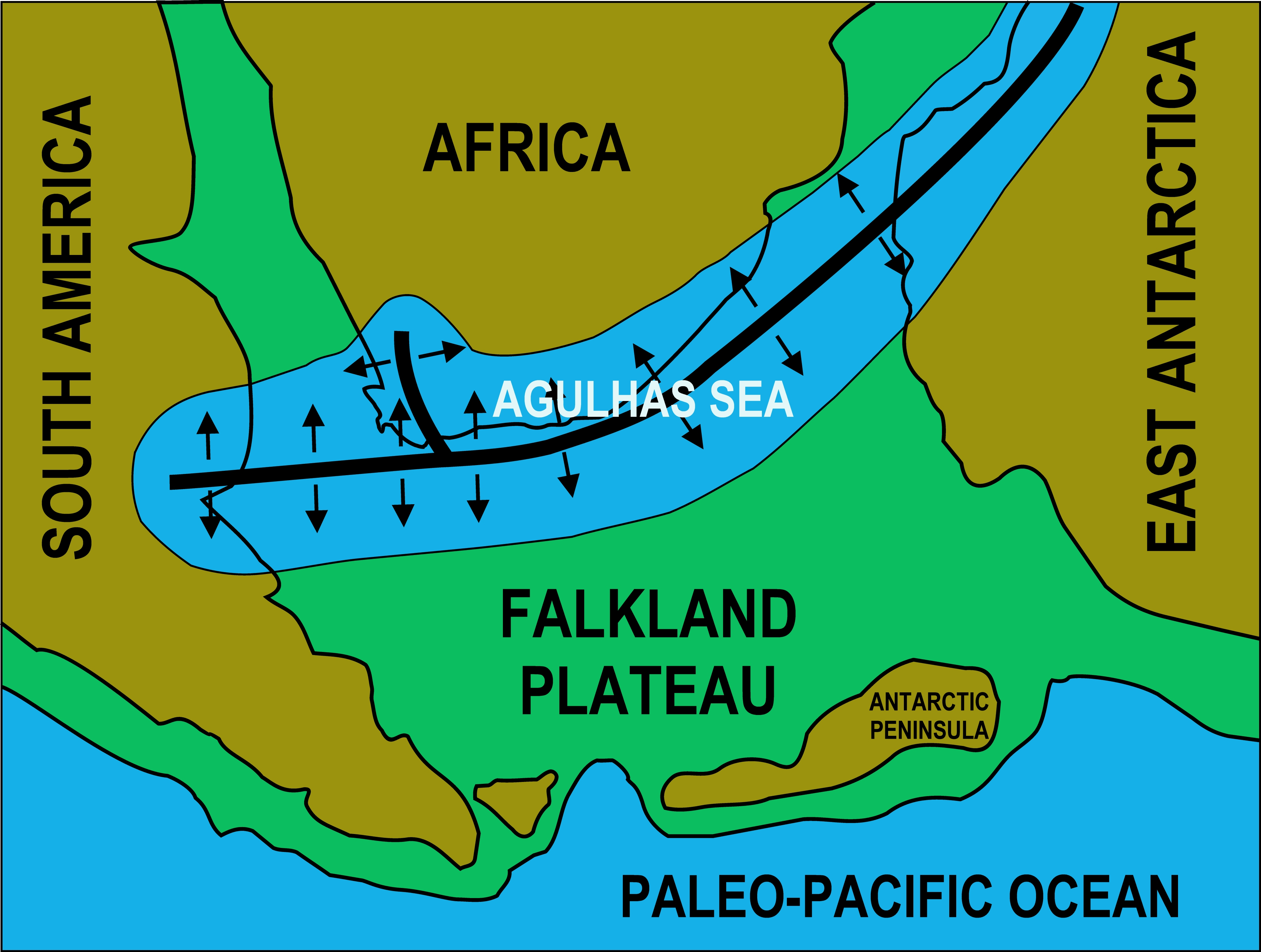
Southern Gondwana during the Cambrian-Ordovician Periods. Today's continents into which this Supercontinent eventually broke up, are indicated in brown. A rift developed about 510 million years ago, separating Southern Africa from the Falkland Plateau. Flooding of the rift formed the Agulhas Sea. The sediments which accumulated in this shallow sea consolidated to form the Cape Supergroup of rocks, which form the Cape Fold Belt today. This portion of Gondwana was probably located on the opposite side of the South Pole from Africa's present position, but compass bearings are nevertheless given as if Africa was in its present position.

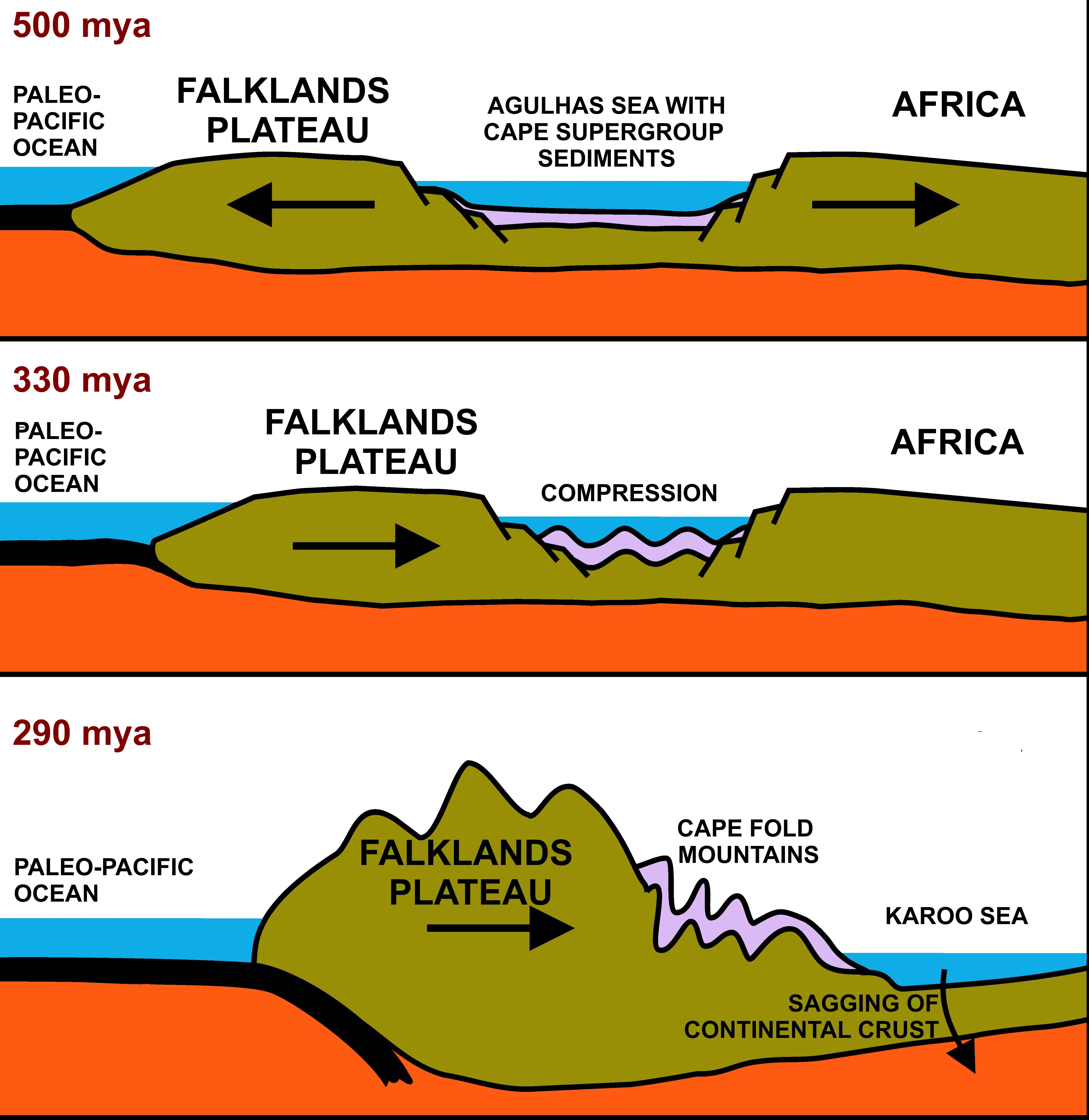
A north-south cross-section through the Agulhas Sea (see above). The brown structures are continental plates, the thick black layer on the left is paleo-Pacific Oceanic plate, red indicates the upper mantle, and blue indicates flooded areas or ocean. The top illustration depicts the geology about 510 million years ago, with the sediments which would eventually form the Cape Supergroup settling in the Agulhas Sea. The middle illustration depicts the Falkland Plateau drifting northwards once again to close the Agulhas Sea, causing the Cape Supergroup to be rucked into a series of folds, running predominantly east-west. The lowest illustration shows how subduction of the paleo-Pacific Oceanic plate under the Falkland Plateau, during the Early Permian period, raised a massive range of mountains. These eventually eroded into the Karoo Sea, forming the Karoo Supergroup. Ultimately, the Falkland Mountains eroded almost completely away, but the Cape Fold Mountains had, by this time, become buried under the Karoo sediments. Being composed largely of quartzitic sandstone, they resisted subsequent erosion, when continental uplifting caused several kilometers of Southern Africa's surface to be planed away, and thus persist to this day as the Cape Fold Belt. The remnant of the Falkland Plateau broke away from Africa, and drifted south-westwards to its present position in the western South Atlantic Ocean, following the breakup of Gondwana about 150 million years ago.

The rocks were laid down as sediments in a rift valley that developed in southern Gondwana, just south of Southern Africa, during the Cambrian-Ordovician Periods (starting about 510 million years ago, and ending about 330–350 million years ago). (See the yellow block labeled C on the Earth's geological timeline diagram on the right.) An 8-km-thick layer of sediment, known as the Cape Supergroup (see below), accumulated on the floor of this rift valley. Closure of the rift valley, starting 330 million years ago, resulted from the development of a subduction zone along the southern margin of Gondwana, and the consequent drift of the Falkland Plateau back towards Africa, during the Carboniferous and early Permian periods. After closure of the rift valley, and rucking of the Cape Supergroup into a series of parallel folds, running mainly east-west (with a short section running north-south in the west, due to collision with eastward moving Patagonia), the continued subduction of the paleo-Pacific Plate beneath the Falkland Plateau and the resulting collision of the latter with Southern Africa, raised a mountain range of immense proportions to the south of the former rift valley. The folded Cape Supergroup formed the northern foothills of this towering mountain range.

The weight of the Falkland-Cape Supergroup mountains caused the continental crust of Southern Africa to sag, forming a retroarc foreland system, into which the Karoo Supergroup was deposited. Eventually much of the Cape Supergroup became buried under these Karoo deposits, only to re-emerge as mountains when upliftment of the subcontinent, about 180 million years ago, and again 20 million years ago, started an episode of continuous erosion that was to remove many kilometers of surface deposits from Southern Africa. Although the tops of the original Cape Fold Mountains were eroded away, they eroded much slower than the considerably softer Karoo deposits to the north. Thus the Cape Fold Belt "erupted" from the eroding African landscape to form the parallel ranges of mountains that run for 800 km along the southern and south-western Cape coastline today. In fact, they form the coastline, either sloping steeply directly into the sea, or are separated from it by a relatively narrow coastal plain.

The Falkland Mountain range had probably eroded into relative insignificance by the mid-Jurassic Period, and started drifting to the south-west soon after Gondwana began to break up 150 million years ago, leaving the Cape Fold Belt to edge the southern portion of the newly formed African continent. Even though the mountains are very old by Andean and Alpine standards, they remain steep and rugged due to their quartzitic sandstone geology (see below) making them very resistant to weathering. The famous Table Mountain forms part of the Cape Fold Belt, being made up of the local lowest (oldest) strata of the Cape Supergroup, composed predominantly of quartzitic sandstone which forms the impressive, almost vertical cliffs which characterize the mountain and the rest of the range which constitutes the backbone of the Cape Peninsula.

The degree to which the original Cape Fold mountains (formed during the Carboniferous and early Permian Periods) have been eroded is attested to by the fact that the 1 km high Table Mountain on the Cape Peninsula is a syncline mountain, meaning that it formed part of the bottom of a valley when the Cape Supergroup was initially folded. The anticline, or highest elevation of the fold between Table Mountain and the Hottentots-Holland Mountains (1.2 to 1.6 km elevation), on the opposite side of the isthmus connecting the Peninsula to the Mainland, has been eroded away. The Malmesbury shale and granite basement on which this anticline mountain rested also formed an anticline; but being composed of much softer rocks, readily eroded into a 50 km wide flat plain, (now covered with dune sands) called the "Cape Flats".

The Cape Fold Belt (i.e. the mountain ranges) extends from about Clanwilliam (approximately 200 km north of Cape Town), to about Port Elizabeth (approximately 650 km east of Cape Town). The Cape Supergroup sediments beyond these points are not folded into mountain ranges, but do, in places, form steep cliffs or gorges, where the surrounding sediments have been eroded away (see, for instance, Oribi Gorge in KwaZulu-Natal).

The mountains, although only of moderate height, are majestic and dramatic. This is due in part to numerous geological factors; The ranges usually have few to no foothills and rise directly from valley floors. The bases of the mountains are usually at or near sea level.

== Cape Supergroup ==
The mountains of the Cape Fold Belt are composed of rocks belonging to the Cape Supergroup, which is more extensive than the Fold Belt. The Supergroup is divided into several distinct Groups.

The western and southern extents of the Supergroup have been folded into a series of longitudinal mountain ranges, by the collision of the Falkland Plateau into what would later become South Africa (see diagrams on the left). However, the entire suite in this region slopes downwards towards the north and east, so that the oldest rocks are exposed in the south and west, while the youngest members of the Supergroup are exposed in the north, where the entire Cape Supergroup dives beneath the Karoo rocks. Drilling in the Karoo has established that Cape Supergroup rocks are found below the surface up to approximately 150 km north of their northernmost exposure on the surface.

The Cape Supergroup extends eastwards beyond the Fold Belt into the Eastern Cape and northern KwaZulu-Natal, where no folding took place.

=== Klipheuwel and Natal Groups ===
The initial sedimentation into the rift valley which developed in southern Gondwana (see diagram at top left) was confined to the western and eastern ends of the rift. Rivers diverted into these early rifts deposited sand and gravel to form the Klipheuwel Group in the west, and the Natal Group in the east. These formations contain no fossils. Today the Klipheuwel Group is exposed in several small patches near Lamberts Bay, Piketberg, and to the south-west of Paarl Rock.

The Natal Group, which is similar to the Table Mountain Group (see below), is found in several elongated patches near the coast of the northern Eastern Cape and KwaZulu-Natal. It forms the impressive cliffs of Oribi Gorge, and can also be seen in a road cutting between Durban and Pietermaritzburg, particularly at the Marian Hill Toll Plaza. Most of the group has been deeply eroded by numerous rivers creating the ragged plateaus and scarps of the Durban-Pietermaritzburg region.

=== Table Mountain Group ===
With the widening and deepening of the rift valley, the entire southern portion of what was to become South Africa, as far as a line extending from Calvinia in the west to East London in the east, plus the KwaZulu-Natal coastline, became flooded, leading to a seaway across the southern and eastern parts of the country, called the Agulhas Sea. The sea floor consisted of the Klipheuwel Group in the west, the Natal Group in the east, and eroded pre-Cambrian rocks in between.

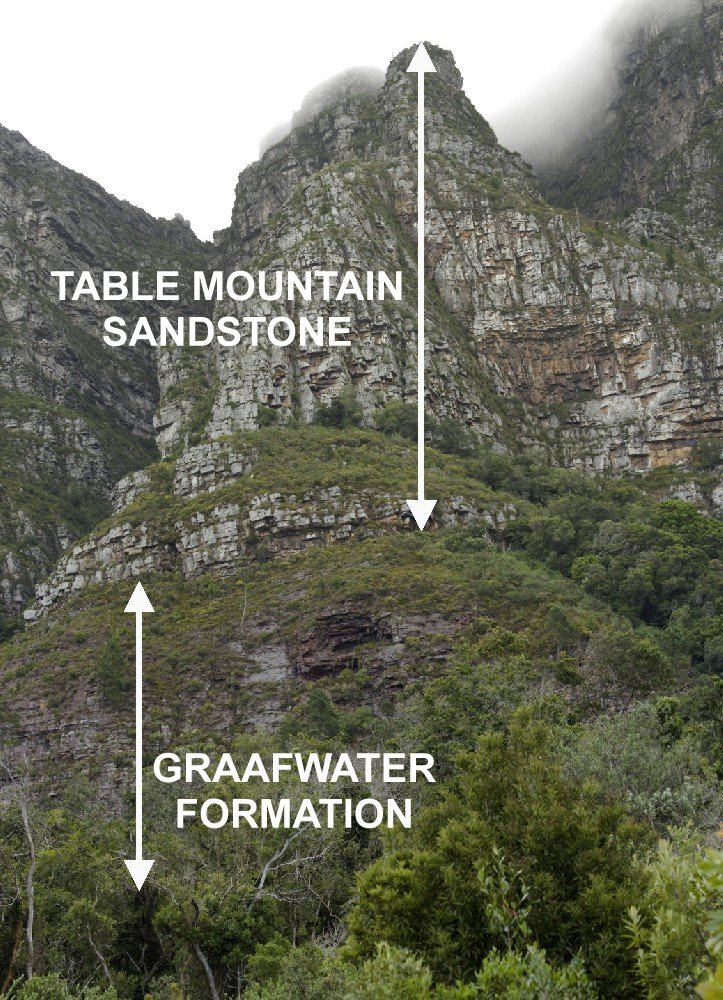
A view of the eastern crags (or cliffs) of Table Mountain and Devils Peak as seen from Newlands Forest, above the University of Cape Town. The two layers of the Table Mountain Group which are represented on the Cape Peninsula, namely the Graafwater Formation and the Table Mountain Sandstone or Peninsula Formation, can readily be distinguished. The remaining layer, the Pakhuis Formation, occurs as a tiny remnant on the top of Table Mountain, not visible in the photograph. The granite basement on which the Table Mountain Group rests on the Cape Peninsula is obscured by the forest in the foreground.

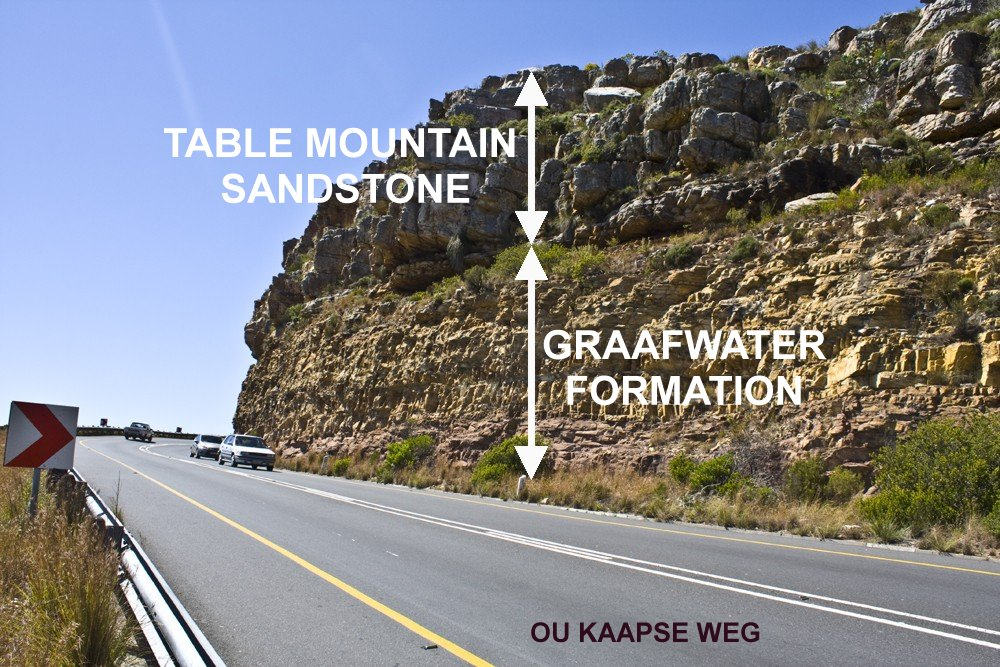
A view of the cutting at the second hairpin bend on Ou Kaapse Weg, as it winds on to the Silvermine Plateau. The transition between the lowermost layer of the Table Mountain Group on the Cape Peninsula – the Graafwater Formation – and the layer above it, the Table Mountain Sandstone or Peninsula Formation, can be clearly seen. The very abrupt transition between them suggests that the Aghulas Sea was initially (during the Graafwater period) an area of inland drainage, possibly below sea level (comparable to the Dead Sea in the Middle East today). When the rift extended into the ocean, the rift valley suddenly flooded to become a deep water passage similar to the Red Sea today. The photograph was taken at an elevation of 250 m.

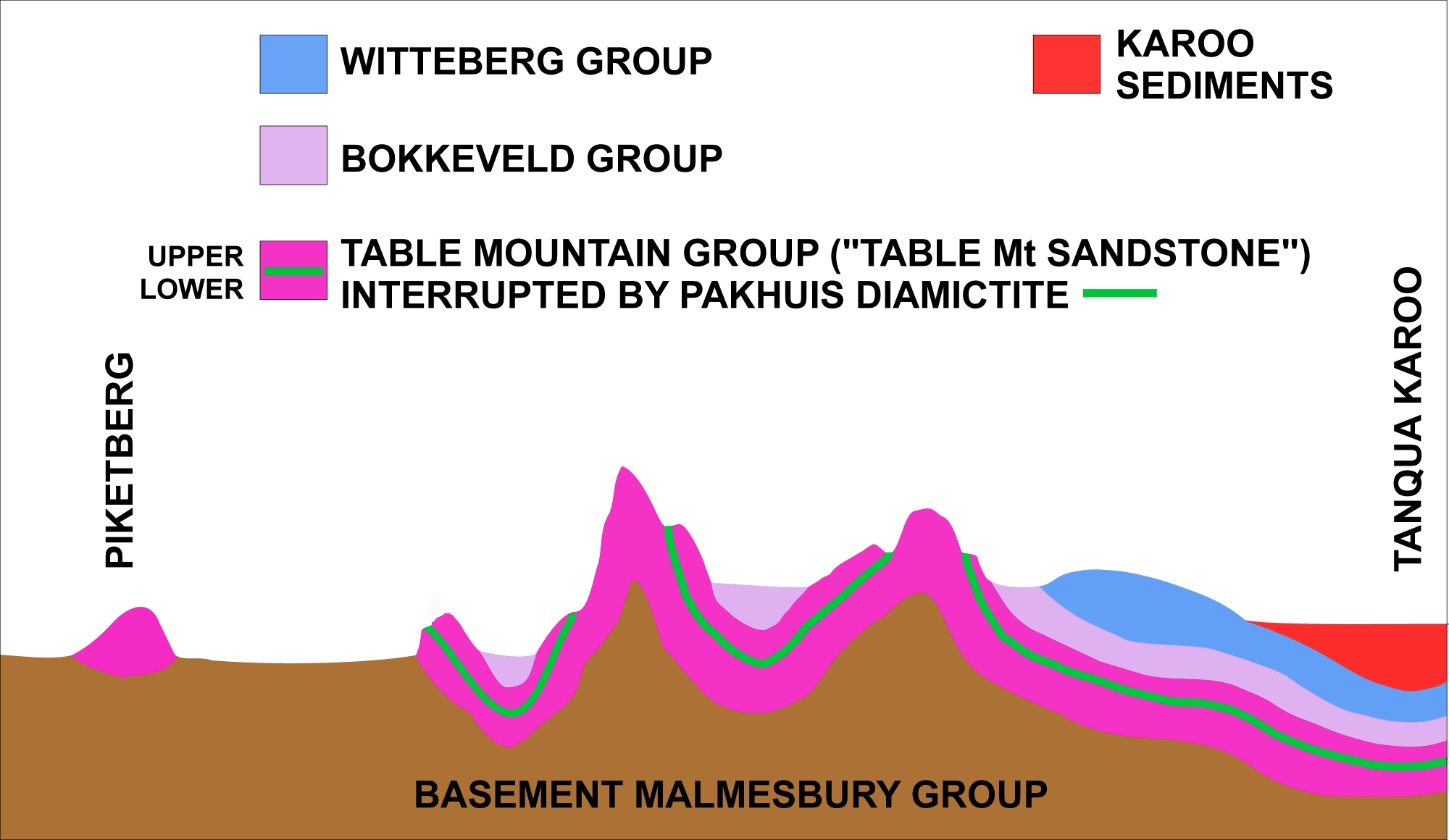
Schematic diagram of an approximate 100 km west-east (left to right) geological cross-section through the Cederberg portion of the Cape Fold Belt. The rocky layers (in different colors) belong to the Cape Supergroup. Not to scale. The green layer is the Pakhuis diamictite formation which divides the Peninsula Formation Sandstone (or Table Mountain Sandstone) into a lower and upper portion. It is the lower (older) portion that is particularly hard and erosion resistant, and, therefore, forms most of the highest and most conspicuous peaks in the Western Cape, as well as the steepest cliffs of the Cape Fold Mountains (including Table Mountain). The Upper Peninsula Formation, above the Pakhuis tillite layer, is considerably softer and more easily eroded than the lower Formation. In the Cederberg Mountains This formation has been sculpted by wind erosion into many fantastic shapes and caverns, for which these mountains have become famous. The Graafwater Formation forms the lowermost layer of the Cape Supergroup in this region, but is, for simplicity, incorporated into the Table Mountain Sandstone Formation in this diagram.

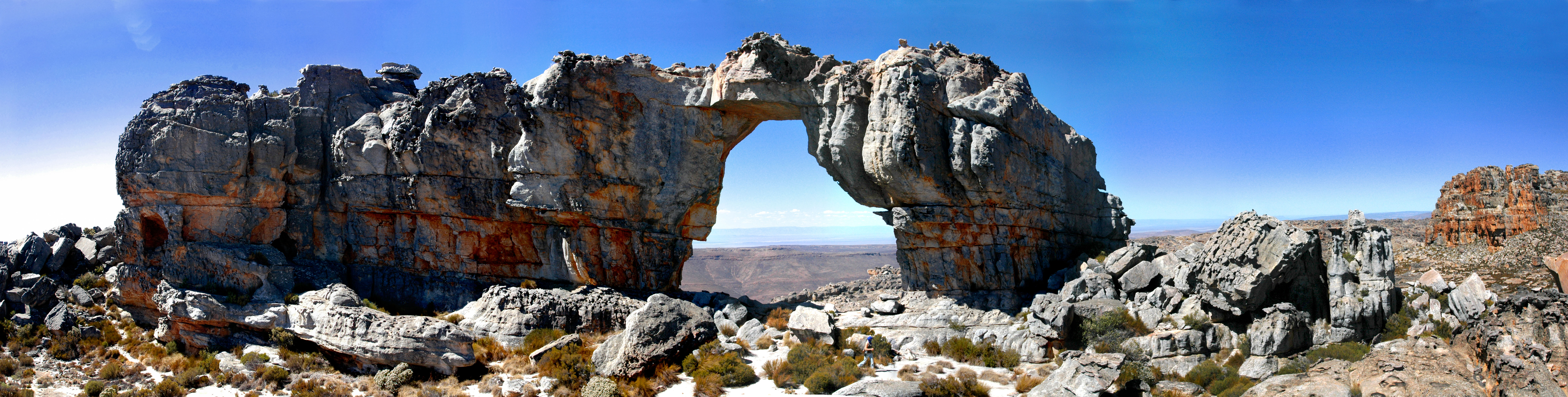
Wolfberg Arch in the relatively easily eroded Nardouw Formation (or Upper Peninsula Formation) rocks of the Cederberg.

The first sediments into the initially still shallow, possibly inland, sea were alternating layers of maroon-colored mudstones and buff-colored sandstones, each mostly between 10 and 30 cm thick. The mudstone units commonly display ripple marks from the ebb and flow of tidal currents, as well as polygonal sand-filled mud cracks that indicate occasional exposure to desiccation. This layer, known as the Graafwater Formation, reaches a maximum thickness of 400 m, but on the Cape Peninsula it is only 60–70 m thick. No fossils have been found in the Graafwater rocks, but shallow-water animal tracks have been found. A particularly good example of these tracks can be viewed in the foyer of Geology Department of the University of Stellenbosch, where a slab of Graafwater rock from the Cederberg mountains has been built into the wall.

The cutting for Chapman's Peak Drive, on the Cape Peninsula, is carved into the Graafwater Formation which overlays the Cape Granite basement rock below the road. The Graafwater Formation can also be clearly seen in the cutting on the second hairpin bend as the Ou Kaapse Weg (road) goes up the slope from Westlake on to the Silvermine plateau. In the cutting one can also see the abrupt and obvious transition into the Peninsula Formation above it. Looking up the slope from below to the first hairpin bend, the granite basement on which the Graafwater formation rests is visible. And in the cutting at the first hairpin bend, the ocher-colored, gritty clay into which the granite weathers is clearly displayed.

With further subsidence of the rift valley floor, and possibly breaking through to the ocean, the sediments abruptly become more sandy, indicative of a sudden increase in the depth of the Agulhas Sea (see photograph on the right). A deposit, known as the Peninsula Formation (also often referred to as Table Mountain Sandstone), consisting of thickly layered quartzitic sandstone, with a maximum thickness of 2000 m, was laid down. These sandstones are very hard, and erosion resistant. They therefore form the bulk of mountains and steep cliffs and rugged crags of the Cape Fold Belt, including the upper 600 m of the 1 km high Table Mountain, below which Cape Town is situated. It contains no fossils.

The Peninsula formation can be traced from 300 km north of Cape Town (i.e. about 50 km north of Vanrhynsdorp on the West Coast), southwards to Cape Town and then eastwards to northern KwaZulu-Natal, a total distance of approximately 1800 km, roughly along the South African coastline. Only the section between Clanwilliam (approximately 200 km north of Cape Town) and Port Elizabeth (approximately 650 km east of Cape Town) is folded into the Cape Fold Mountains.

During the laying down of the Peninsula Formation sediments, the western portion of the region was covered for a geologically brief period by glaciers. The diamictite sediments that were laid down by these glaciers, or in glacial lakes, are known as the Pakhuis and Cederberg Formations. A small patch of Pakhuis tillite occurs on the top of Table Mountain at Maclear's Beacon, but most of the Pakhuis and Cederberg Formations are found as a thin layer (on average only about 60 m thick) in the Peninsula Formation rocks of the more inland mountains to the west of a line between Swellendam and Calvinia. These diamictite rocks are composed of finely ground mud, containing a jumble of faceted pebbles. They can easily be recognized at a distance as this formation readily erodes into fertile, gently sloping, green swaths in a landscape where this contrasts starkly with the bare rocky surfaces of the quartzites above and below. In several locations the quartzites below the glacial horizon have been rucked into a series of folds. This is believed to have been caused by the movement of ice ploughing into the underlying unconsolidated sands. A good example of this can be seen on a ridge of rocks near Maclear's Beacon on Table Mountain, close to the edge of the plateau overlooking the Cape Town City Bowl and Table Bay.

The Pakhuis Formation is also well exposed on the road along Michell's Pass just below the Tolhuis, and especially on the Pakhuis Pass near Clanwilliam, from which the formation derives its name.

The glaciers which formed the Pakhuis and Cederberg formations came from the north west, in the direction of the South Pole which was located in the neighborhood of Cameroon at the time.

The Upper Peninsula Formation, above the Pakhuis and Cederberg Formations, consists of much softer sandstone than the Lower Peninsula Formation, and is often referred to as the Nardouw Formation. In the Cederberg this formation has been eroded by the wind into a wide variety of "sculptures", caves, and other fascinating structures for which these mountains have become well-known.

=== Bokkeveld Group ===
About 400 million years ago (in the early Devonian Period) there was further subsidence of the rift valley floor. This brought about the deposition of deeper-water, fine grained sediments of the Bokkeveld Group. This is in marked contrast to the predominantly sandy sediments of the Table Mountain Group. The Bokkeveld Group consists predominantly mudstones.

After the Cape Supergroup had been folded into the Cape Fold Mountains, these soft mudstones readily washed away from the mountain tops, and only remain in the valleys. Here they form the fertile soils on which the vineyards and fruit orchards of the Western Cape flourish with the help of irrigation from the rivers that have their sources in the surrounding mountains.

The Bokkeveld Group does not extend on to the Cape Peninsula or its isthmus (the Cape Flats). Here the Stellenbosch, Franschhoek, Paarl, Durbanville, Tulbagh and Constantia vineyards have been planted on the weathered Cape Granite and Malmesbury shale soils, which form the basement rocks on which the Cape Supergroup rocks in this region rest.

The Bokkeveld Group extends eastwards to Port Alfred (near Grahamstown), approximately 120 km beyond the eastern extent of the Cape Fold Belt.

The bulk of the fossils found in the Cape Supergroup occur in the Bokkeveld mudstones. They include a variety of brachiopods, as well as trilobites, molluscs, echinoderms (including starfish, crinoids, and the extinct blastoids and cystoids), foraminifera and fish with jaws (placoderms).

=== Witteberg Group ===
The upper layers of the Bokkeveld Group become increasingly more sandy, grading into the sandstone of the Witteberg Group, named for the range of mountains to the south of Matjiesfontein and Laingsburg in the southern Karoo. These rocks were laid down 370 – 330 million years ago in the silted up, and therefore shallow marine conditions of what remained of the Agulhas Sea. The group contains fewer fossils than the Bokkeveld Group, but the assemblage that is preserved includes primitive fish, an extinct species of shark, brachiopods, bivalves, and a meter long sea scorpion. There are also plant fossils and numerous animal tracks. The Witteberg Group is truncated by the overlying Dwyka sediments of glacial origin. The latter forms part of the Karoo Supergroup. Therefore, the Witteberg Group forms the uppermost layer of the Cape Supergroup. It tends to form the most inland outcrops of the Cape Supergroup, and can be traced eastwards as far as the Bokkeveld Group can be traced (i.e. to Port Alfred), about 120 km beyond the Cape Fold Belt.

The Bokkeveld and Witteberg groups do not occur in the north-eastern Eastern Cape and KwaZulu-Natal, where the Cape Supergroup is represent only by the Natal Group and a trace of the Peninsula Formation (without the intervening Graafwater Formation).

=== Formation of the Fold Mountains ===
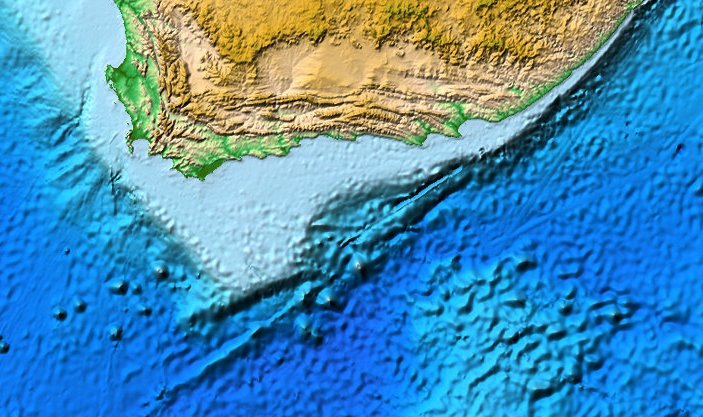
The Agulhas Bank is the broad, shallow part of the southern African continental shelf which extends up to 250 km (160 mi) south of Cape Agulhas before falling steeply to the abyssal plain. It represents the remains of the Falkland Plateau still attached to Southern Africa. The Agulhas Ridge (or Agulhas-Falkland Fracture Zone) which runs from the south-eastern edge of the Bank towards the south west for 1,200 kilometres (750 mi) across the South Atlantic, is the transform fault along which the remainder of the Falkland Plateau moved to the southern tip of South America, a short while after Gondwana broke up, 110 million years ago.

The Witteberg sediments were laid down in what remained of the Agulhas Sea – a shallow, much reduced expanse of water compared to its size during the Bokkeveld period. Immediately following the Witteberg period (about 330 million years ago) much of Gondwana (particularly what was to become Africa and Antarctica, but also parts of South America and India) became covered in a kilometers thick layer of ice as the super-continent drifted over the South Pole. The diamictite deposits left by these glaciers form the first layer of the Karoo Supergroup, called the Dwyka Group. During the glaciation period the Falkland Plateau started to move northwards into what was to become southern Africa, closing the depression that had been the Agulhas Sea, and rucking the Cape Supergroup sediments into folds running roughly parallel to what would ultimately become the south-western and southern coastlines of South Africa. This mountain building continued into the next phase of the Karoo sedimentation, which began about 260 million years ago, after the ice sheets had melted, leaving a large lake (the Karoo Sea) extending over much of South Africa. The resulting marine or lacustrine deposits form the Karoo's Ecca Group. During these Ecca times continued collision of the Falkland Plateau into Southern Africa, and subduction of oceanic crust under the plateau caused the formation of a range of mountains of Himalayan proportions to the south of South Africa. The Cape Fold Mountains became fully formed during this period to become the northern foothills of this enormous mountain range. The folding that occurred during this period therefore involved not only the Cape Supergroup sediments, but also the southern portions of the Dwyka and Ecca Groups of the Karoo Supergroup.

By the time Gondwana broke up about 150 million years ago, the Falkland Mountains had been all but eroded away, before drifting south-westwards to their present position off the coast of southern South America, close to Cape Horn, leaving behind only the submarine Agulhas Bank along the southern coastline of Africa. The Cape Fold Mountains possibly survived erosional obliteration, firstly because of the extremely hard rocks (the Peninsula Formation Sandstone) that form the backbone of the mountain chains, but also possibly because they had become buried under the Karoo deposits which originated in the Falkland Mountains. Thus traces of Karoo deposits can, for instance, be found in the Worcester-Robertson valley in the middle of the Fold Belt.

Although the Dwyka and Ecca sediments adjoining the Cape Fold Mountains were subjected to the same compression forces that gave rise to the Cape Mountains, they do not form the same mountain ranges as do the Cape Fold Mountains. This is because they are composed of much softer rocks than the Peninsula Formation Sandstone, and were thus soon eroded into the flat plains of the "Lower Karoo", except where they were protected by hard, erosion resistant dolerite or turbidite caps, to form isolated mountains that stand out from the plain.

== Appearance ==
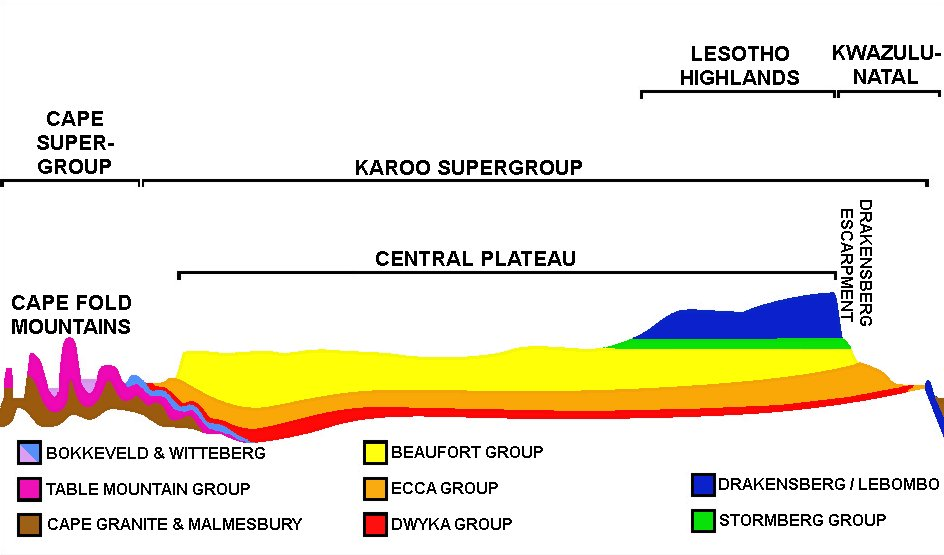
An approximate SW-NE geological cross section through South Africa, with the Cape Peninsula (with Table Mountain) on the far left, and north-eastern KwaZulu-Natal on the right. Diagrammatic and only roughly to scale to scale. The difference in both composition and structure of the Cape Fold Mountains and the Central Plateau surrounded by the Great Escarpment, in particular the Drakensberg, can clearly be seen.

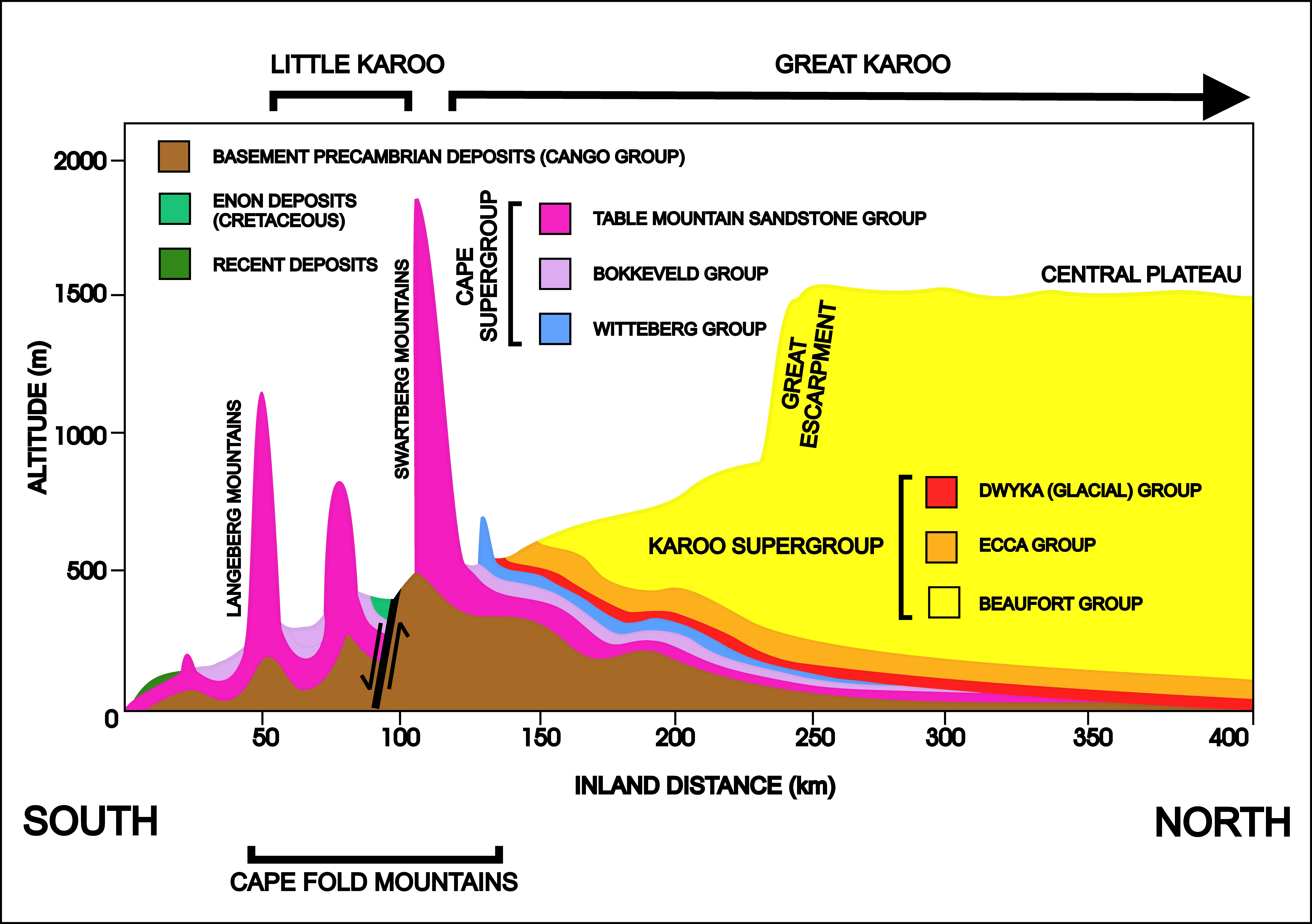
A diagrammatic 400 km north-south cross-section through the southern portion of the country at approximately 21° 30' E (i.e. close to Calitzdorp in the Little Karoo), showing the relationship between the Cape Fold Mountains (and their geological structure) and the geology of the Little and Great Karoo, as well as the position of the Great Escarpment. The colour code for the geological layers is the same as those used in the diagram above. The heavy black line flanked by opposing arrows is the fault that runs for nearly 300 km along the southern edge of the Swartberg Mountains. The Swartberg Mountain range owes some of its great height to uplift along this fault. The subsurface structures are not to scale.

The mountains are not particularly ancient, despite their old-looking appearance. They are considered middle-aged in geologic terms. They were created when the Falkland Plateau collided with Southern Africa, when Pangaea, the supercontinent formed during the Cambrian-Ordovician periods (from 510 to about 330–350 million years ago),. Their stature, with heights varying from 1000m to 2300m, is mostly due to the weather-resistant rocks of quartzitic sandstone of the Peninsula Group (see above).

They occur in long parallel ranges each not much more than 10 km wide, separated by equally long valleys with a maximum width of about 50 km (mostly only 15–30 km wide). Almost all of these ranges consist of hard erosion resistant Peninsula Group rocks. The valleys tend to be floored by Bokkeveld Group mudstones. A remarkable feature of these ranges is that the 1500 m high mountains (from base to crest) are cut through by very narrow, almost vertically walled defiles, not much more than 50–70 m wide at the bottom, through which rivers flow from the inland Great Escarpment to the sea. It is from within these narrow defiles, many of which can be traveled by road, that one is afforded a cross sectional view of the mountains, and can appreciate their intense folding and distortion (see the photographs on the top right above). Their origin is as follows:

After the fold mountains had been formed they became buried under sediments derived from the massive Himalaya-sized Falkland Mountains to the south of the Cape Fold Belt. Sediments eroded from these mountains provided the bulk of the 6 km thick Beaufort sediments in the Karoo Basin, but they also covered the Cape Fold Belt, thereby protecting them from erosion. At the end of the Karoo Period about 180 million years ago, the subcontinent was covered by a thick layer of Drakensberg lavas, an event that was accompanied by upliftment or bulging of Southern Africa, ushering in an almost uninterrupted period, continuing to the present, of erosion removing many kilometers of surface rocks from the entire subcontinent. Rivers running off this bulging interior into the seas that were forming around South Africa as Gondwana was breaking up 150 million years ago, eventually encountered rocky ridges as the protective layer over the Cape Fold Belt eroded away, exposing their mountain tops. The rivers breached these ridges, after possibly being dammed back for a short period, creating a narrow passage through the low rocky barrier. Continued erosion exposed more and more of these quartzitic mountain ranges, but the rivers, now confined to narrow, fast flowing gorges, continued breaking through each barrier as the surrounding landscape eroded to lower and lower levels, particularly during the past 20 million years.

These 150‑million-year-old rivers therefore cut the defile, starting by flowing over, and then through the gradually erupting Cape Fold Mountains, to form the spectacular "poorte" and "klowe" (plural of "poort" and "kloof", the Afrikaans for defile or chasm) that characterize these mountains today. The best known defiles are: Meiringspoort, Seweweekspoort, the Tradouws Pass, Kogmanskloof, Garcia's pass, the Gourits River gorge (which does not have a road running through it), and Michell's Pass, which is, however, more V-shaped than the others, but impressive nevertheless. In addition several roads and highways crest the mountains over cols, or go through them via tunnels.

A number of parallel faults still run roughly parallel with the coast, having formed during the Gondwana rifting when South America and the Falkland Plateau separated from Africa. Patagonia was to the west of Cape Town and the Falkland Islands were to the south during the Jurassic Period prior to separation. Most of these faults are inactive today, but on 29 September 1969 the towns of Ceres and Tulbagh, about 160 km north-east of Cape Town, were severely damaged by a major earthquake, originating from movement of the northern end of the Worcester Fault.

Another major (inactive) fault runs for 300 km along the southern edge of the Swartberg Mountains. The Swartberg Mountains were uplifted along this fault, to such an extent that in the Oudtshoorn region the rocks that form the base of the Cape Supergroup are exposed. These are locally known as the "Cango Group", but are probably continuous with the "Malmesbury Group" that forms the base of Table Mountain on the Cape Peninsula, and similar outcrops in the Western Cape. In the Little Karoo the outcrop is composed of limestone, into which an underground stream has carved the impressively extensive Cango Caves.

== The ranges ==
The following is a list of the largest individual ranges within the Cape Fold Belt include from west to east. (Translations in brackets; berg is Afrikaans for mountain; its plural is berge.)

- Cederberg (Cedar) – Table Mountain Group
- Olifants River Mountains (Elephant's) – Table Mountain Group
- Piketberg (Picket) – Table Mountain Group
- Winterhoek Mountains (Winter corner) – Table Mountain Group
- Skurweberge (Rough or scaly) – Witteberg Group
- Hex River Mountains (Witch river) – Table Mountain Group
- Cape Peninsula and Table Mountain – Table Mountain Group
- Du Toitskloof Mountains (Du Toit's canyon, from a French surname) – Table Mountain Group
- Drakenstein Mountains (Dragon stone, the name of a country estate in the Netherlands) – Table Mountain Group
- Simonsberg (Simon's) – Table Mountain Group
- Hottentots-Holland Mountains (Hottentot, an old name for the Khoi aboriginal inhabitants) – Table Mountain Group
- Kogelberg (Bullet, or cone-shaped) – Table Mountain Group
- Stettynsberge (probably a surname) – Table Mountain Group
- Langeberg (Long) – Table Mountain Group
- Riviersonderend Mountains (River without end) – Table Mountain Group
- Kleinrivier Mountains (Small river) – Table Mountain Group
- Witteberge (White) – Witteberg Group
- Swartberge (Black) – Table Mountain Group
- Outeniqua Mountains (aboriginal: place of honey) – Table Mountain Group
- Langkloof Mountains (Long valley) – Table Mountain Group
- Kouga Mountains (aboriginal) – Table Mountain Group
- Tsitsikamma Mountains (aboriginal: place of much water) – Table Mountain Group
- Baviaanskloof Mountains (Valley of baboons) – Table Mountain Group
- Zuurberge (Sour, acid or acidic) – Witteberg Group

== See also ==
- Geology of South Africa
- Cape Peninsula – Rocky peninsula in the Western Cape, South Africa
- Table Mountain – Mountain overlooking Cape Town, South Africa
- Table Mountain Sandstone – Group of rock formations within the Cape Supergroup sequence of rocks
- Karoo Supergroup – Late Paleozoic-early Mesozoic stratigraphic unit in Africa
- Great Escarpment – Major topographical feature in Africa
