= Spirophyton =

Trace fossil

Spirophyton is the name of an ichnogenus or trace fossil that several (but not all) authors consider to be a subjective synonym of Zoophycos.
