= Versfeld Pass =

Mountain Pass in South Africa

- Versfeldpas
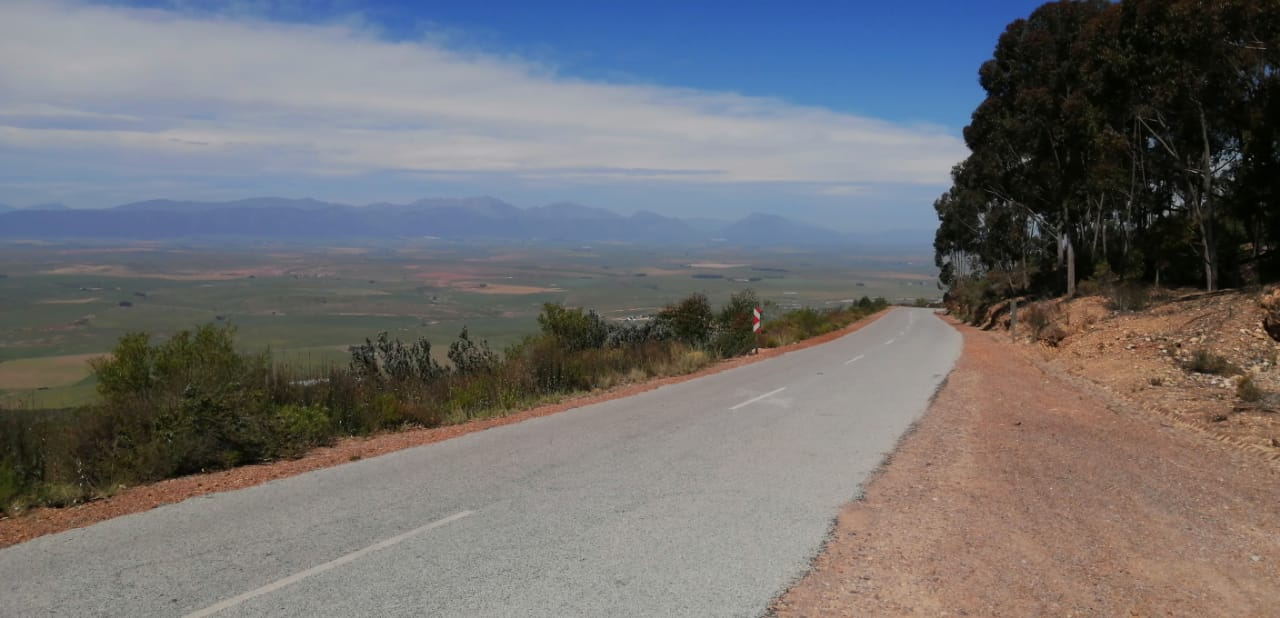
- Photo from the top of Versfeld Pass

- Location within Western Cape
- Elevation: 689 metres (2,260 ft)

First Approach
- Avg gradient: 1:12 %

Second Approach
- Length: 6 kilometres (3.7 mi)

Third Approach
- Location: South Africa
- Range: Piketberg mountain Range
- Coordinates: 32°51′22″S 18°44′24″E

Versfeld Pass is a mountain pass located to the west of the R366, the pass is used to give access to the top of the Piketberg mountain range where many fruit farms are located. The pass is two lanes wide and often has heavy motor vehicles using it to reach the aforementioned farms. The summit of the pass is 689m high. There is a viewpoint both at the summit, and midway through the pass for vehicles to pull over.

== First Pass History ==
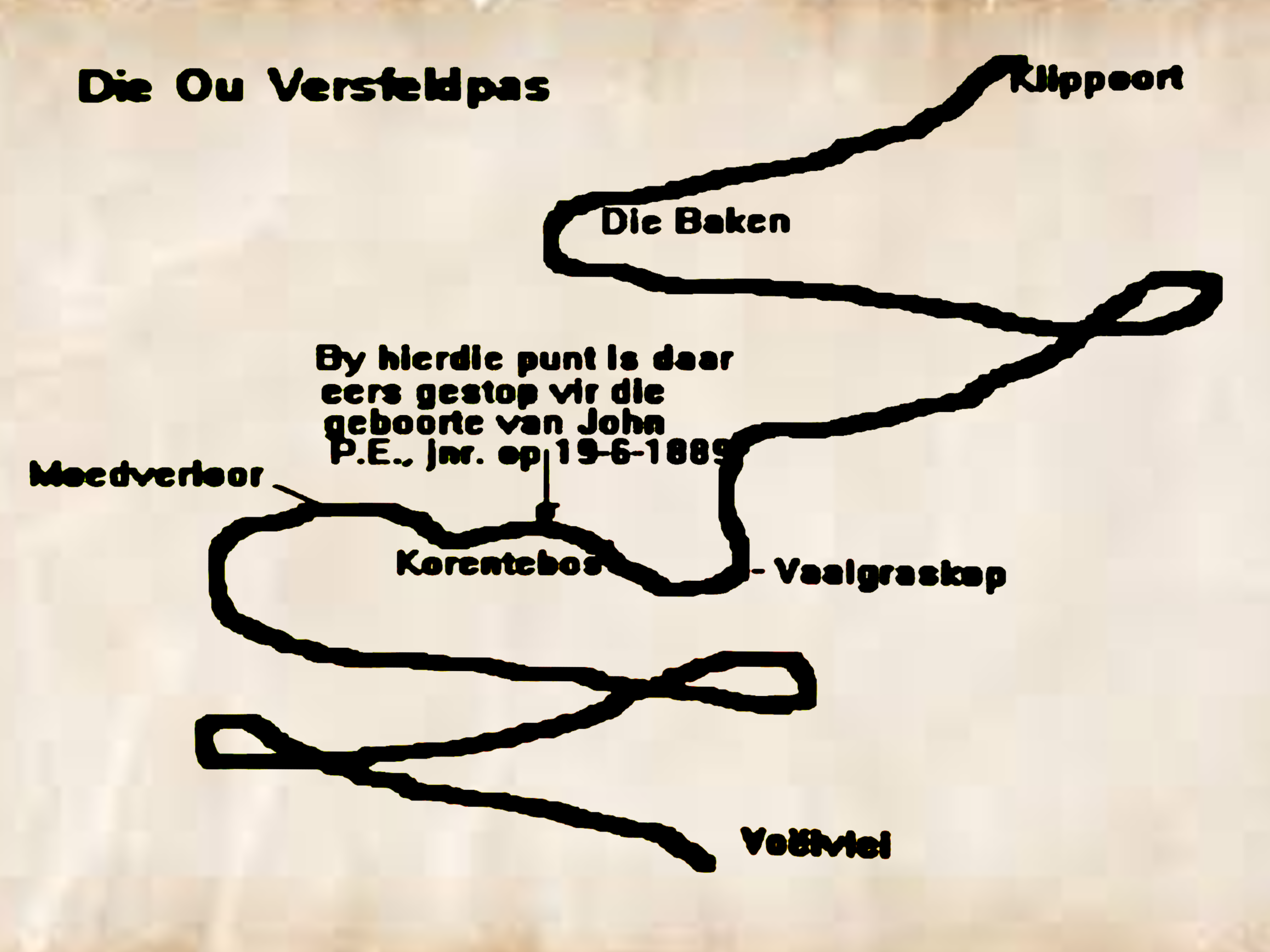
Sketch of Versfeld pass by L.W

The first pass, sometimes referred to as “die ossewapas” (the ox wagon pass) by the locals, was built from 9 km outside of Piketberg to the top of Piket-Bo-Berg. The first pass was built in 1889 by Johannes Paulus Eksteen Verfeld (John). Before the pass was built, the journey to the top of the mountain was a dangerous and slow trip, typically taking 4 hours to traverse the mountain. Later it was recorded that John had many close encounters on these trips where his children almost died, which strengthened his belief that a pass was needed. Soon after one of these trips, John went to the local government and petitioned for a pass to be built; when John realised that the government of the time had no intent to build a pass, he set out to build one himself.

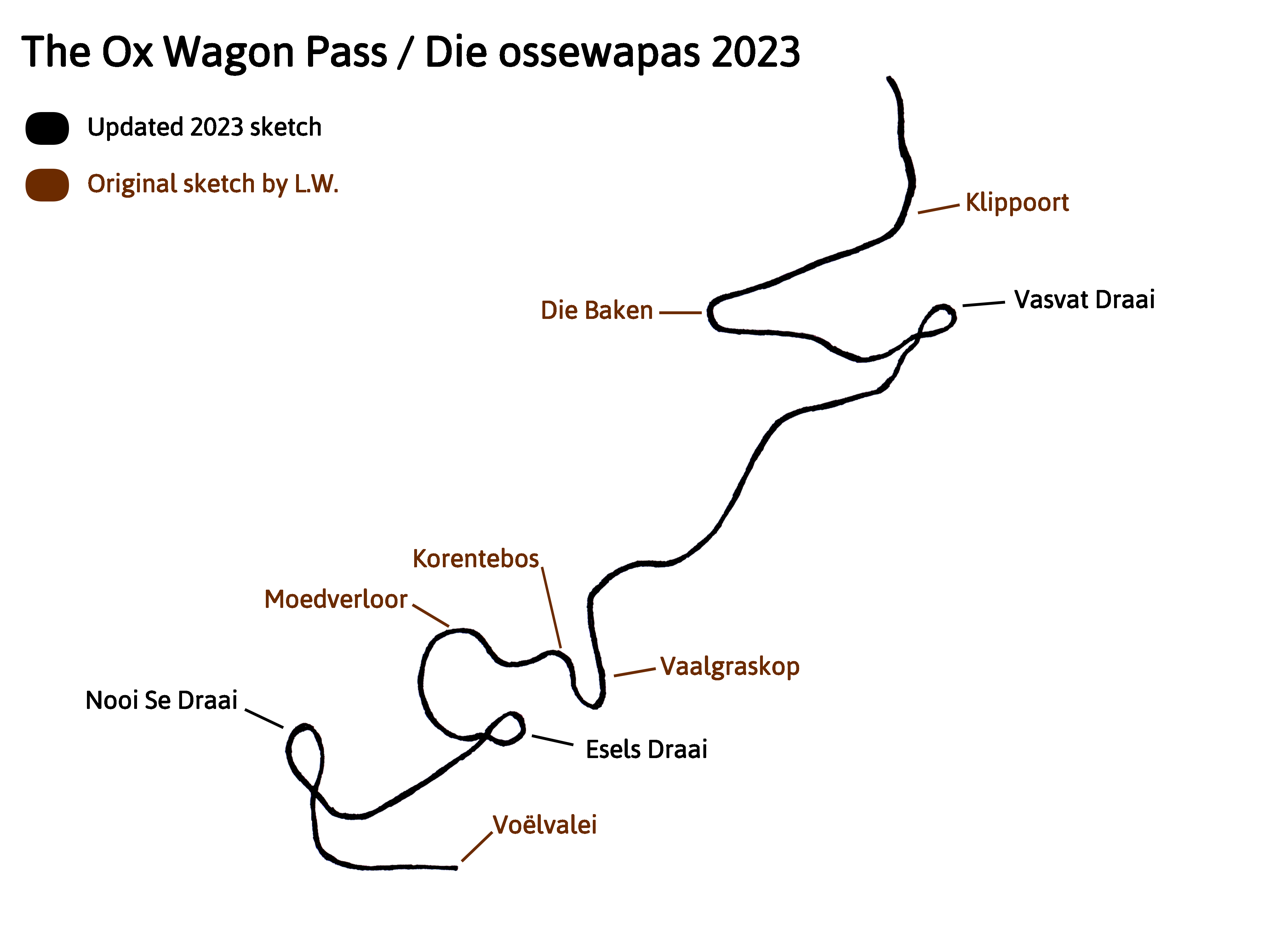
Updated 2023 sketch of die ossewapas

As the story goes, John would go out of his house every day near sunset and go sit on a rock overlooking Piketberg in the valley below, he'd sit smoking his pipe until sundown. He did this for about a month. One day he woke up in the middle of the night, looked at his watch glistening in the moonlight and shouted, “That's it… That is what I will do with my pass!”. The shape he saw in the moonlight would later become the distinctive loops on the first pass.

Soon after that John set out to make his pass. He hired 16 workers, and they started working on the first pass. John supervised its building and was present every day from its start to its completion. He only stayed away on one day, which was for the birth of his son. Due to having built the pass incorrectly the first time, the completion time took 3 months in total with a gradient of 1:4, at a cost of £200 or R400 (£32,000 or R750,000 in today's currency).

== Second Pass History ==
The first motor vehicles started to use the pass in 1926 until in 1943 a man by the name of Christopher Armstrong from Heldervue farm realised that the pass was no longer adequate for the standards of a modern pass. He went to the local divisional counsel and advocated for a new pass. Thus, the mountain pass was reconstructed 4 km closer to Piketberg, and named in honor of Versfeld for building the first one. Later on in 1958 the pass was widened and then in addition to that in 2017 the pass's third wall was widened again.

== Photos from first pass ==
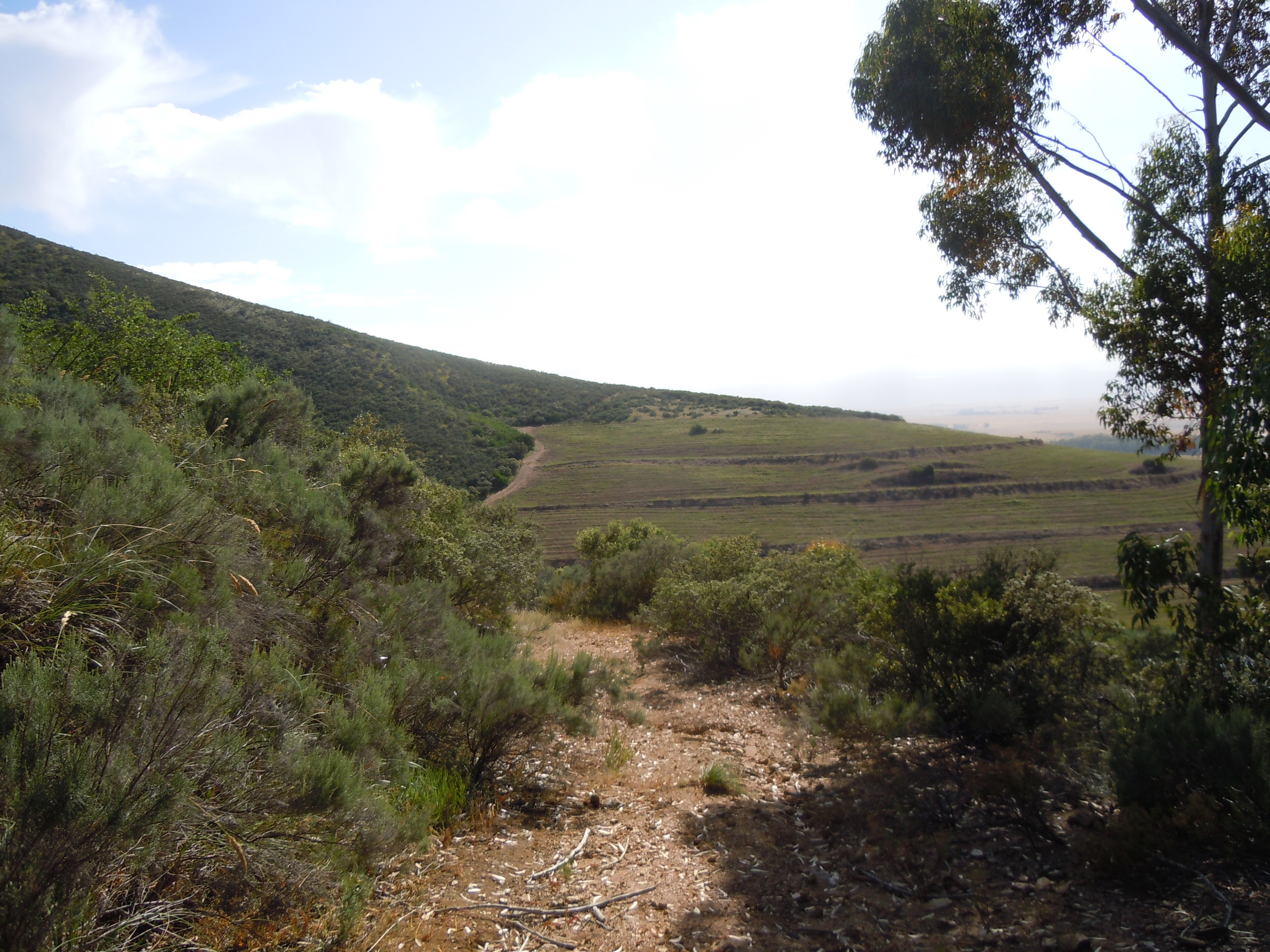
View of Voelvalei looking down

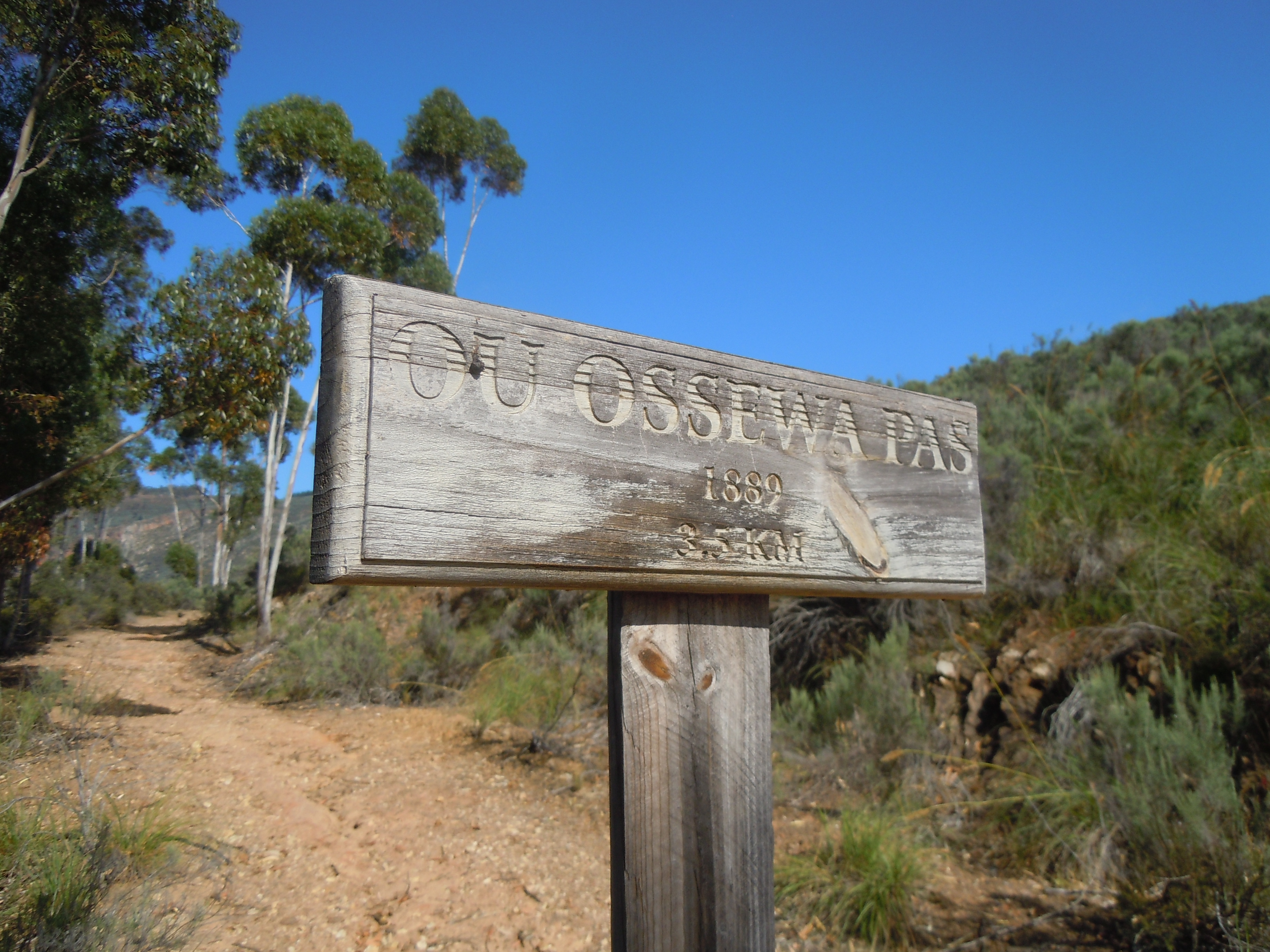
Sign at bottom of pass

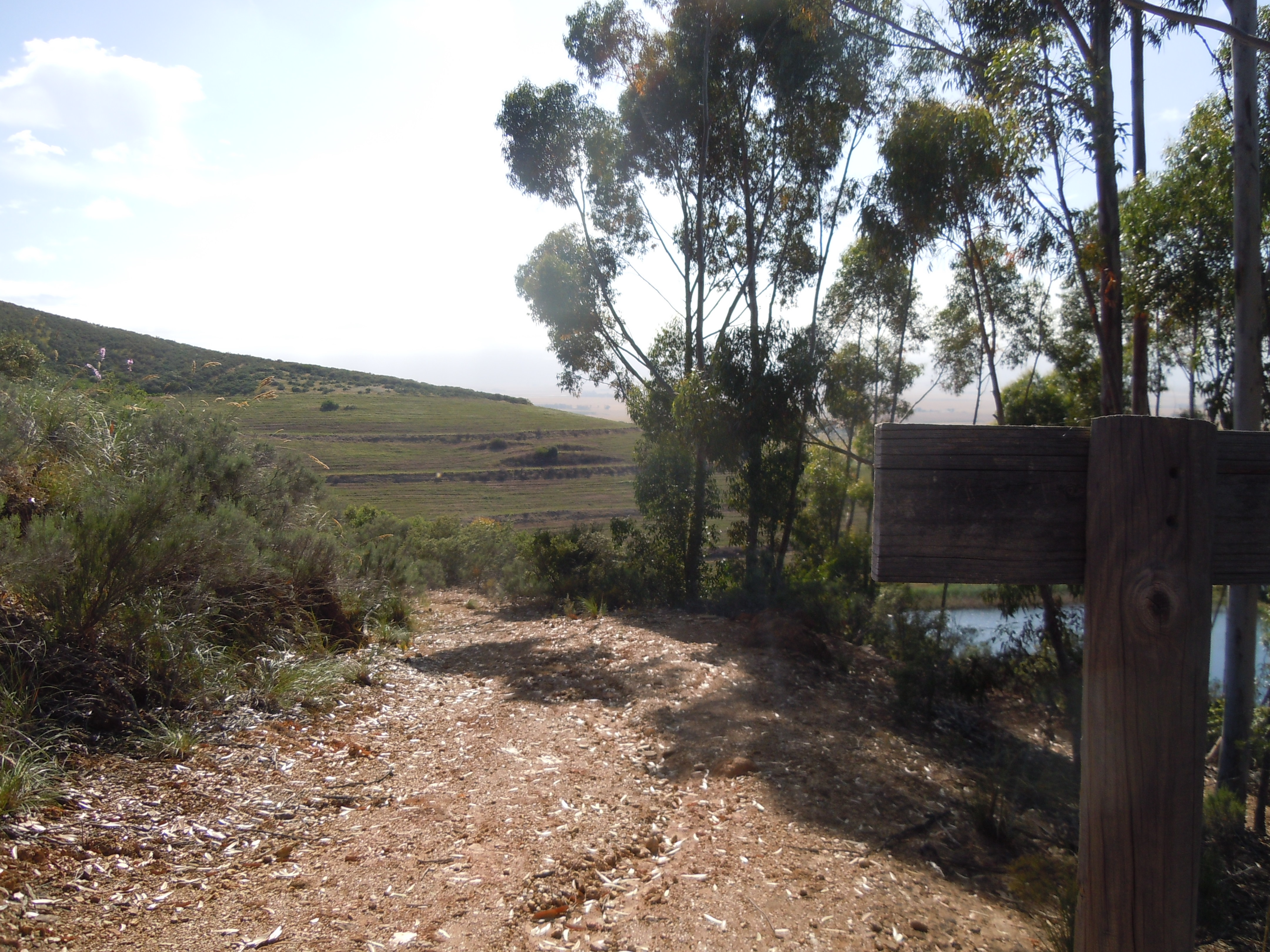
Bottom of pass looking down at Voëlvalei

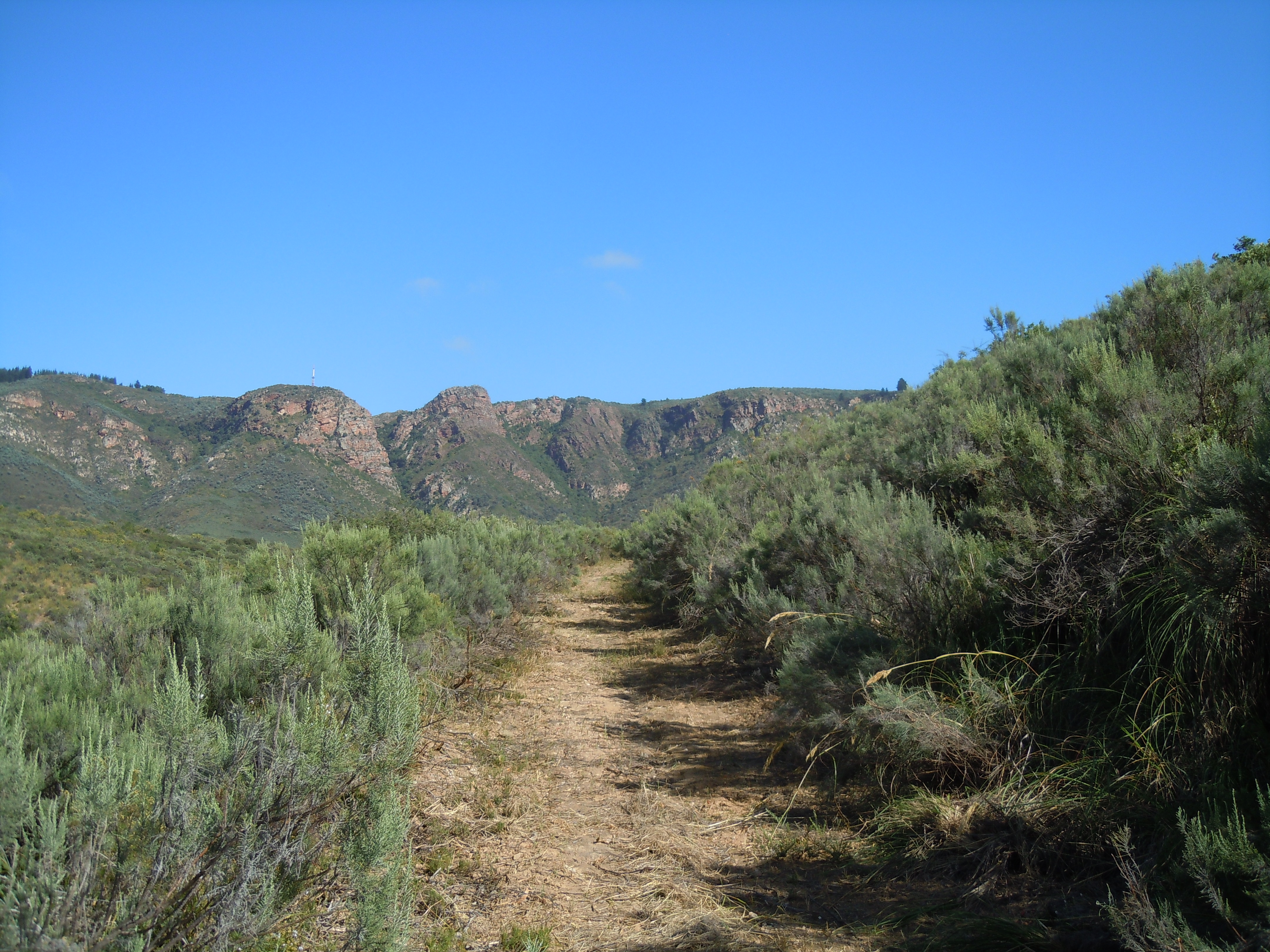
Bottem of pass looking up

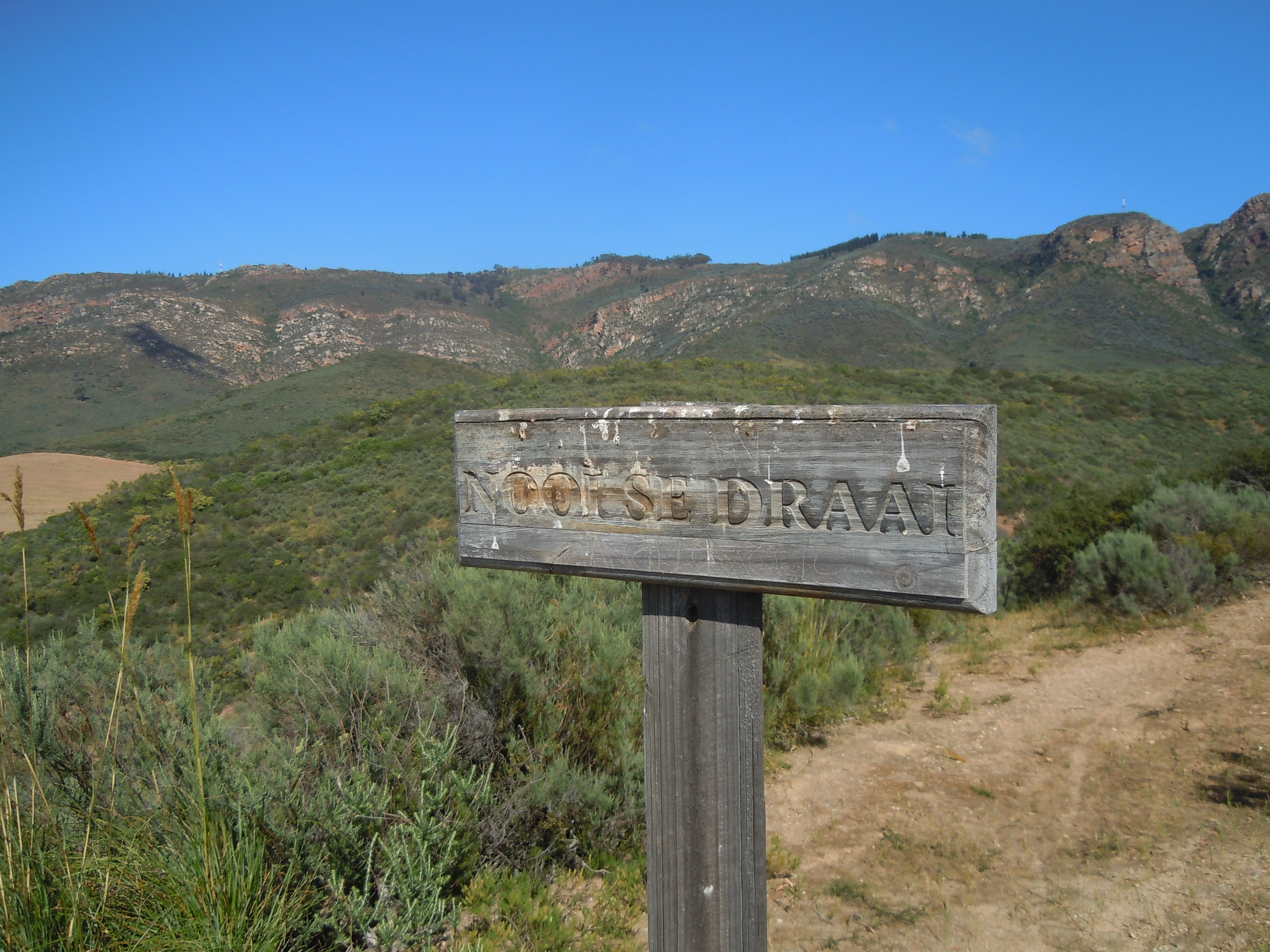
Nooi se Draai sign

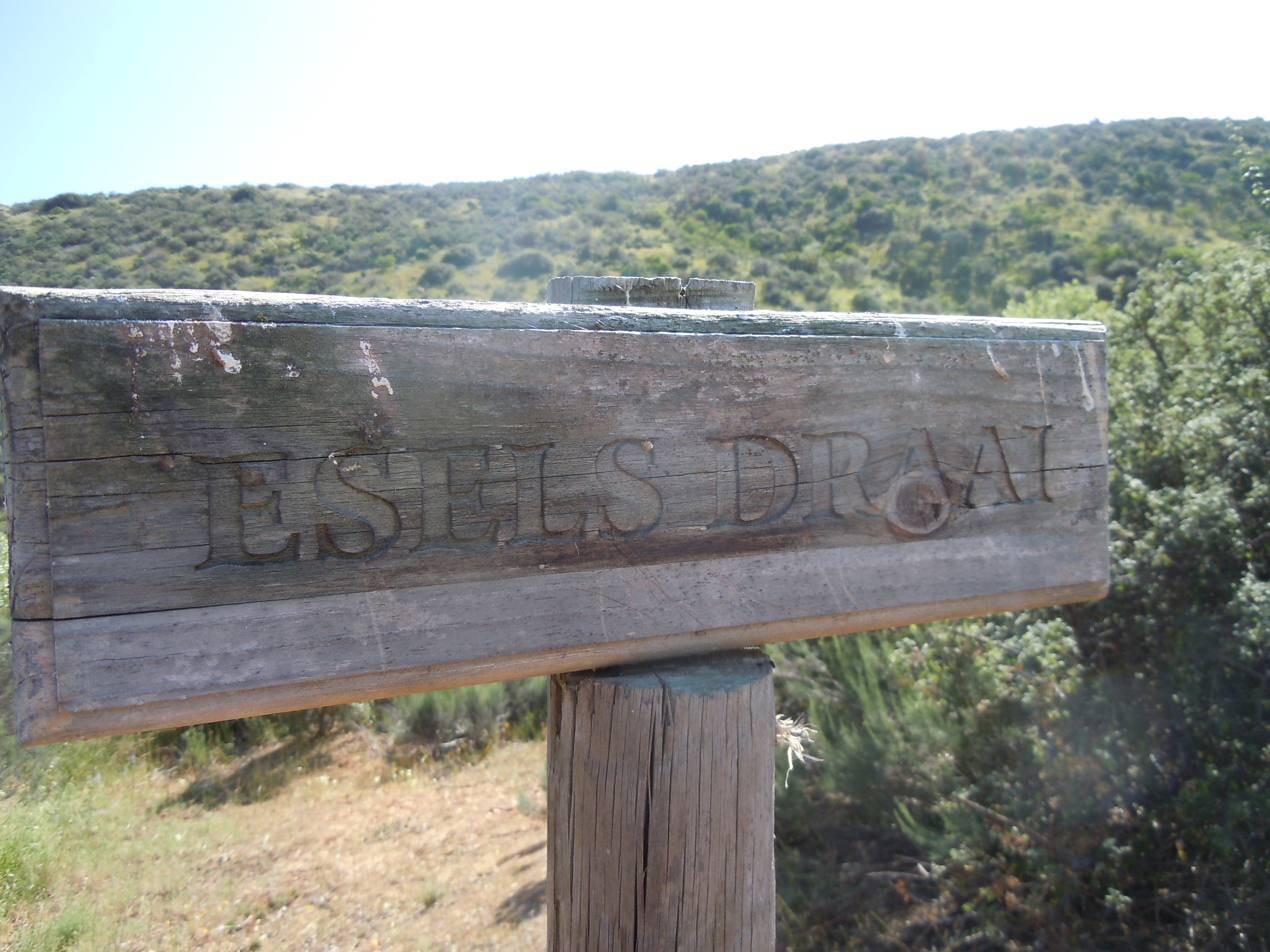
Esels Draai sign

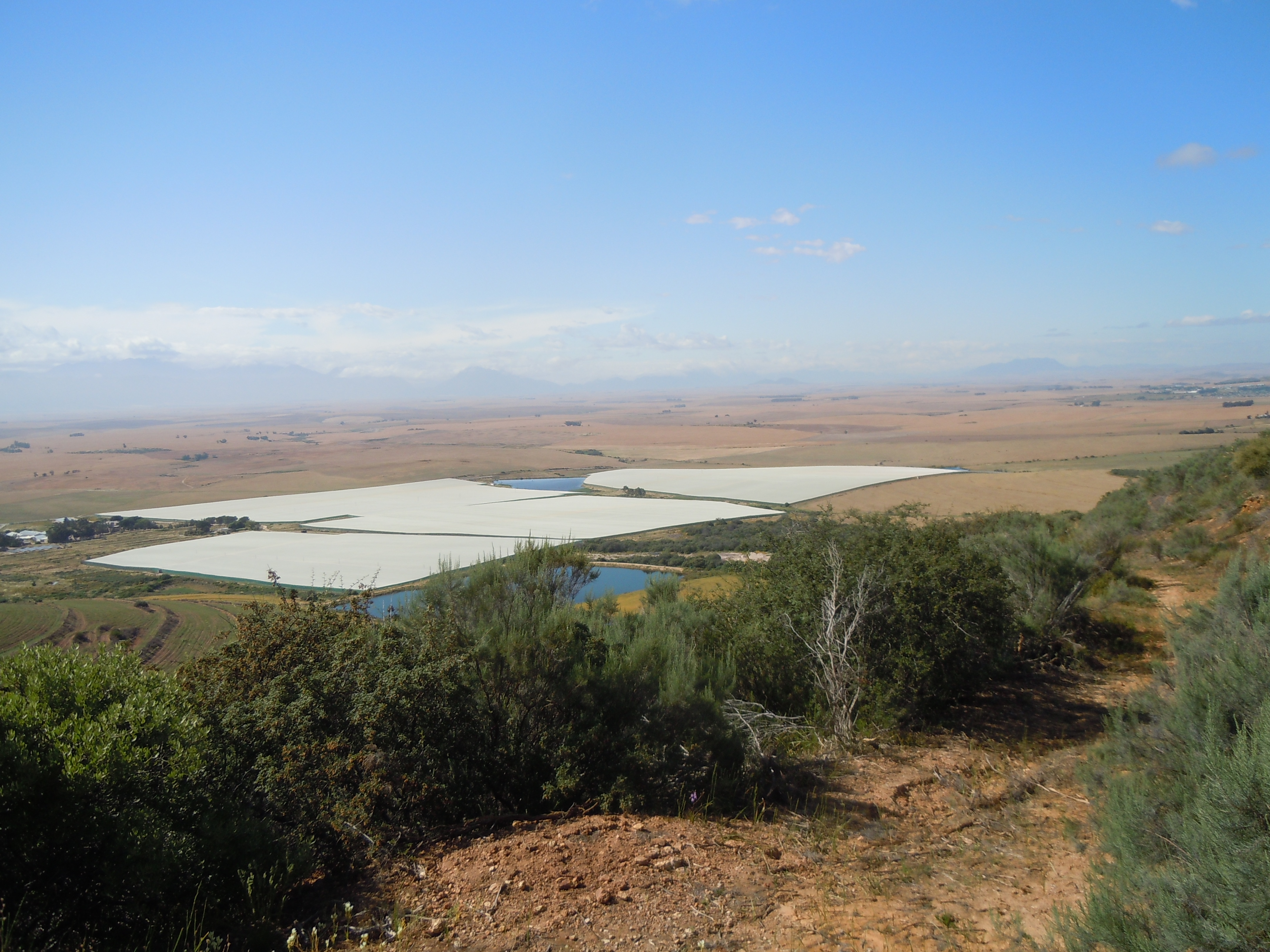
Esels Draai looking down

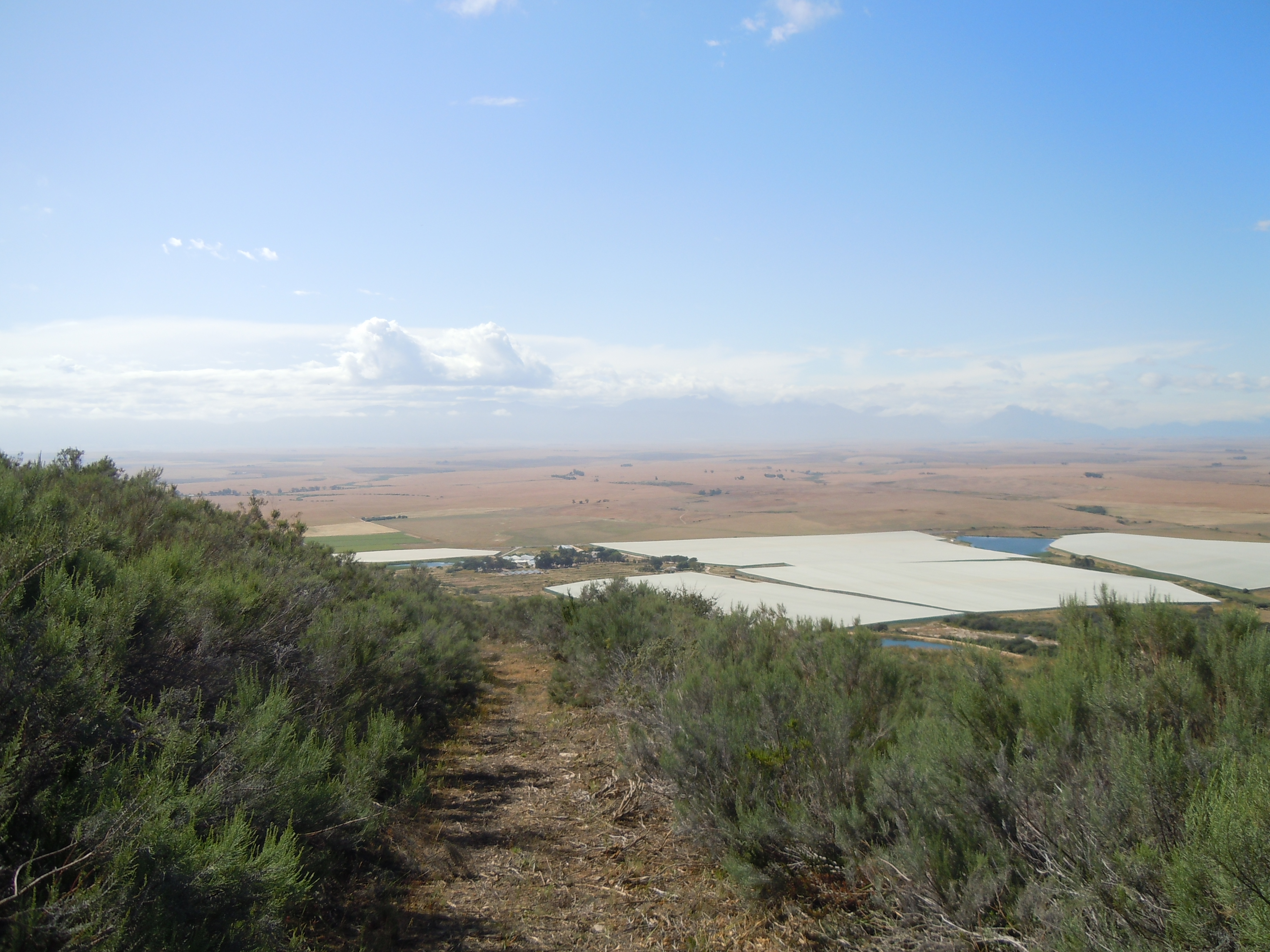
View from Moedverloor looking down

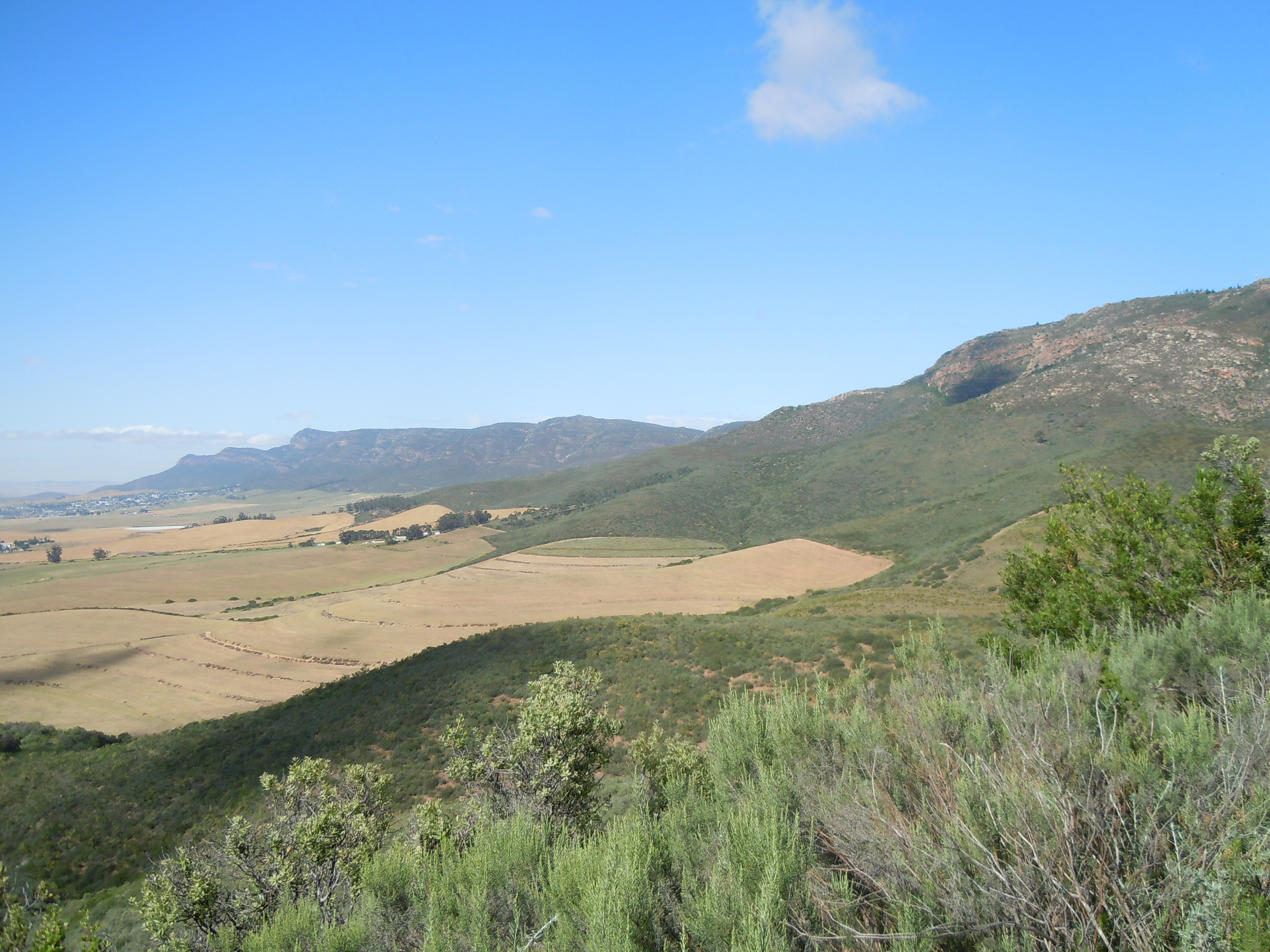
View from Moedverloor

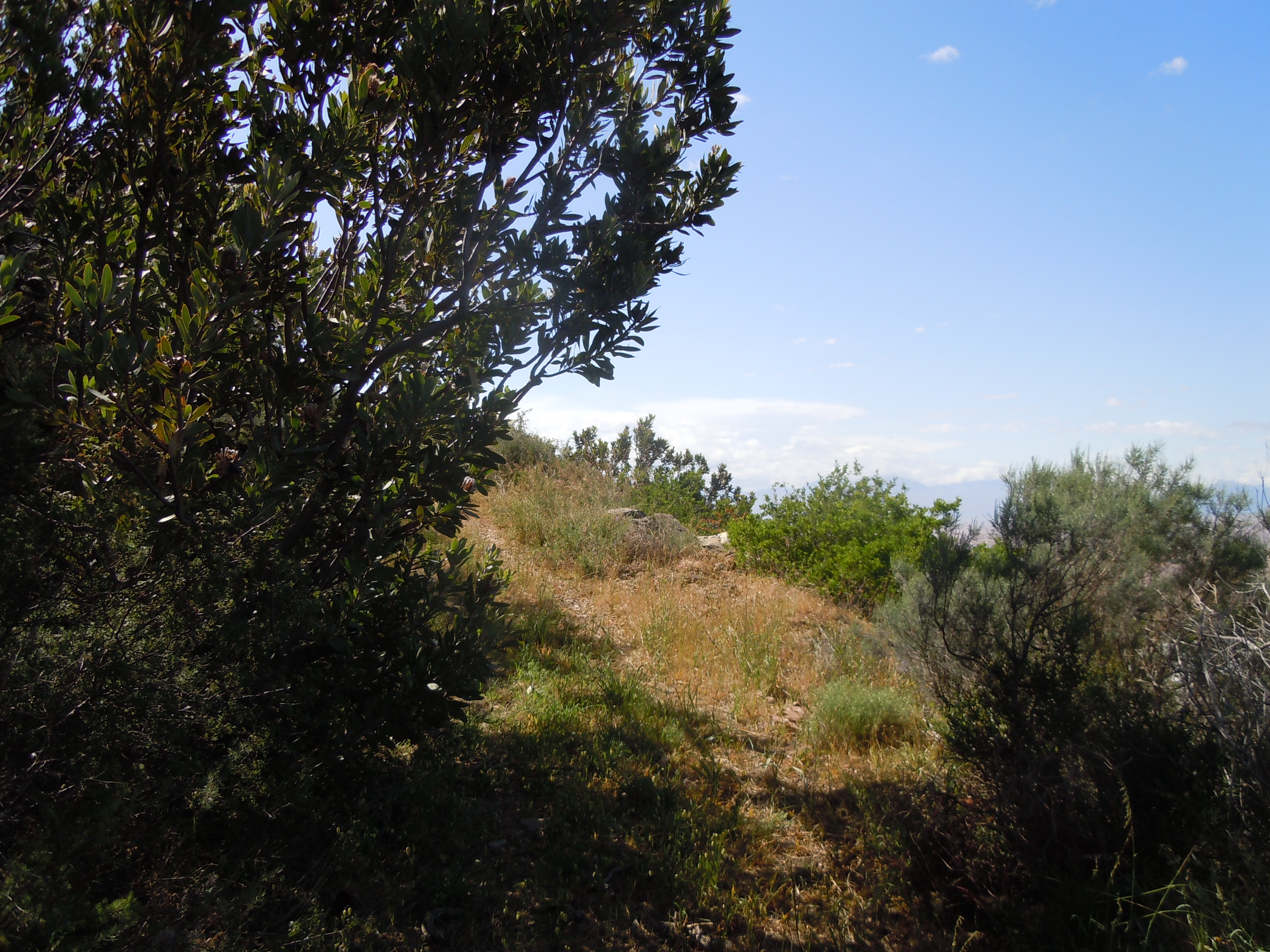
View from Korentebos looking up

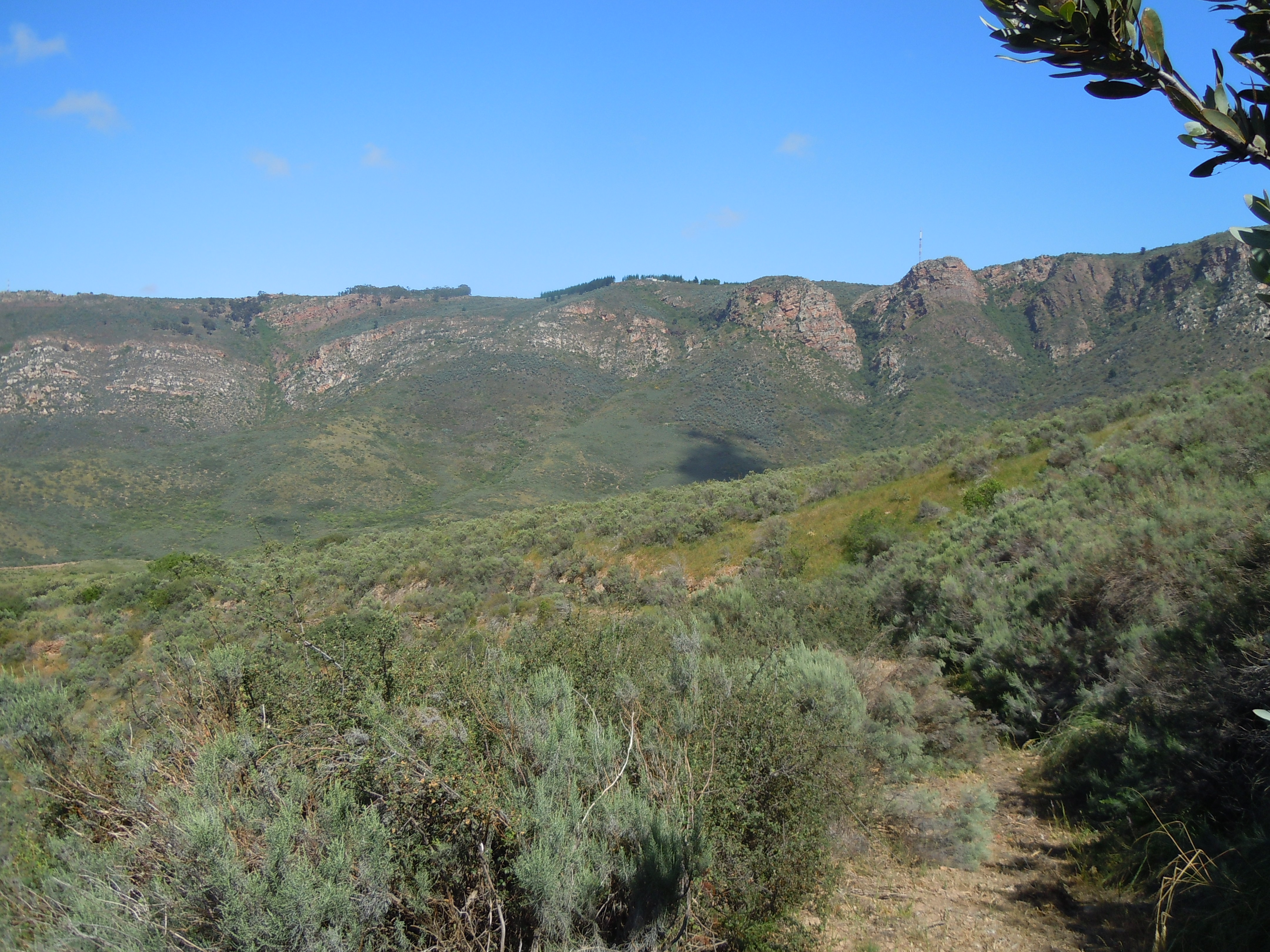
View from Korentebos looking down

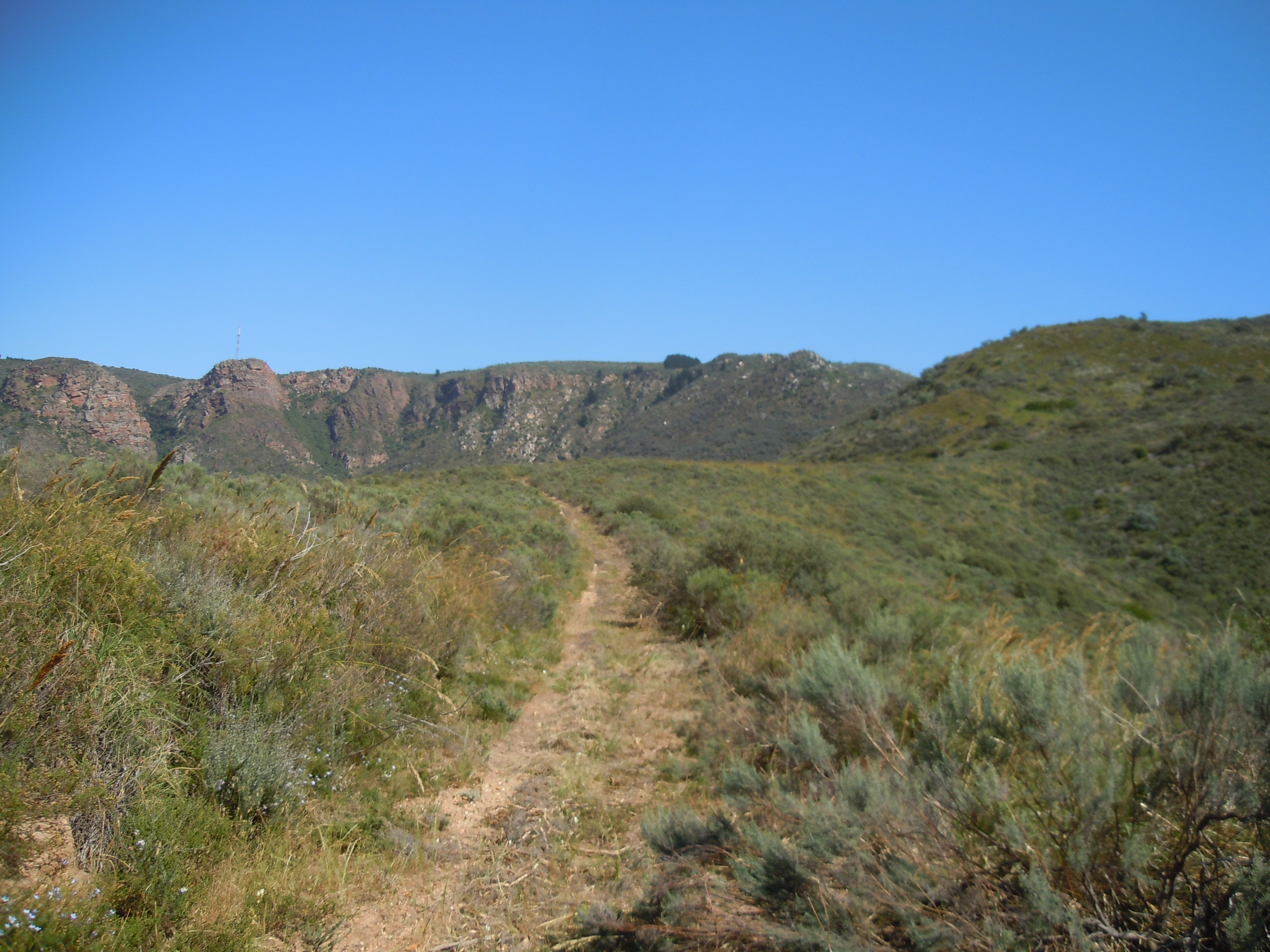
View from Valgrasskop looking up

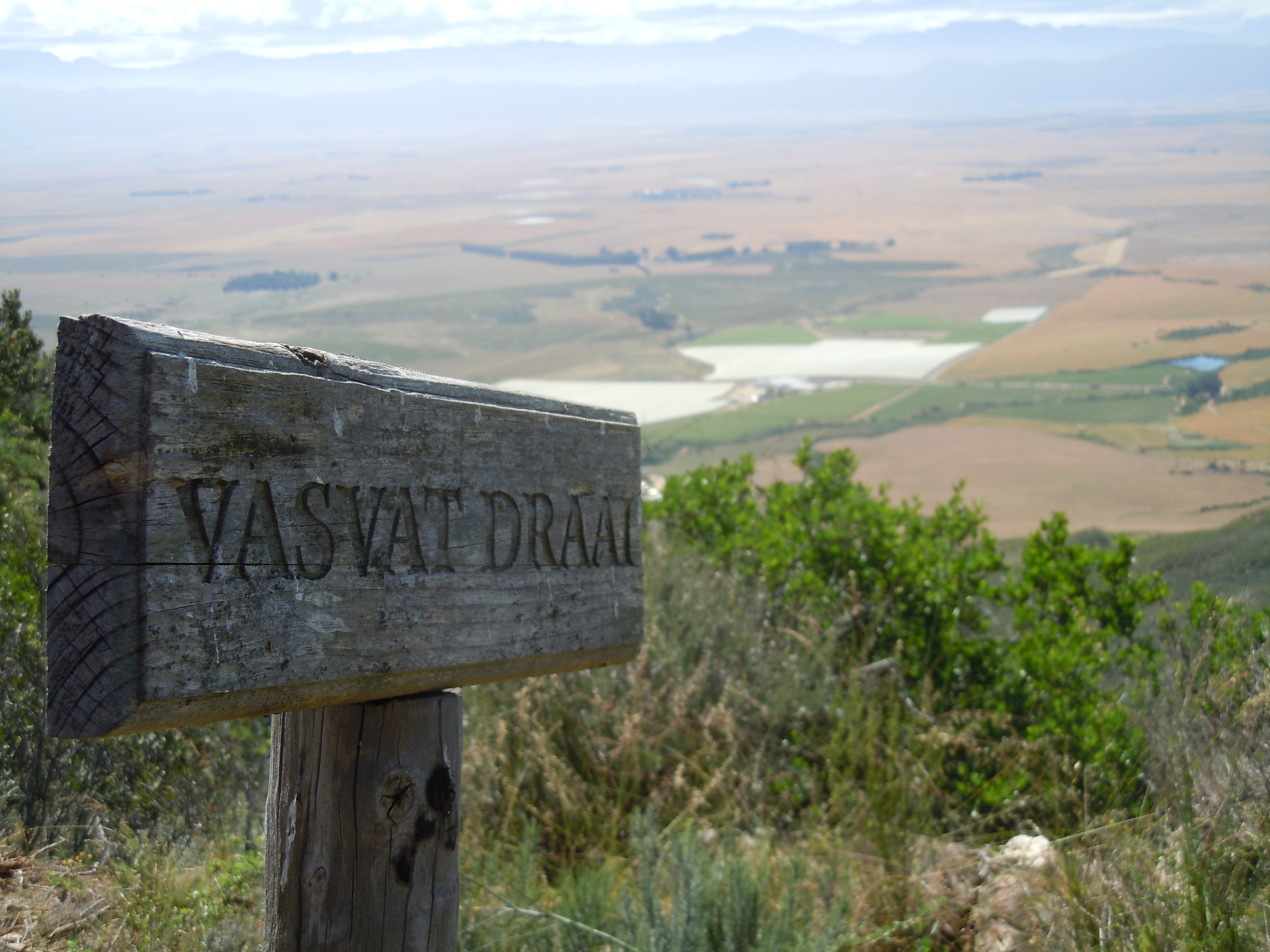
Vasvat Draai sign

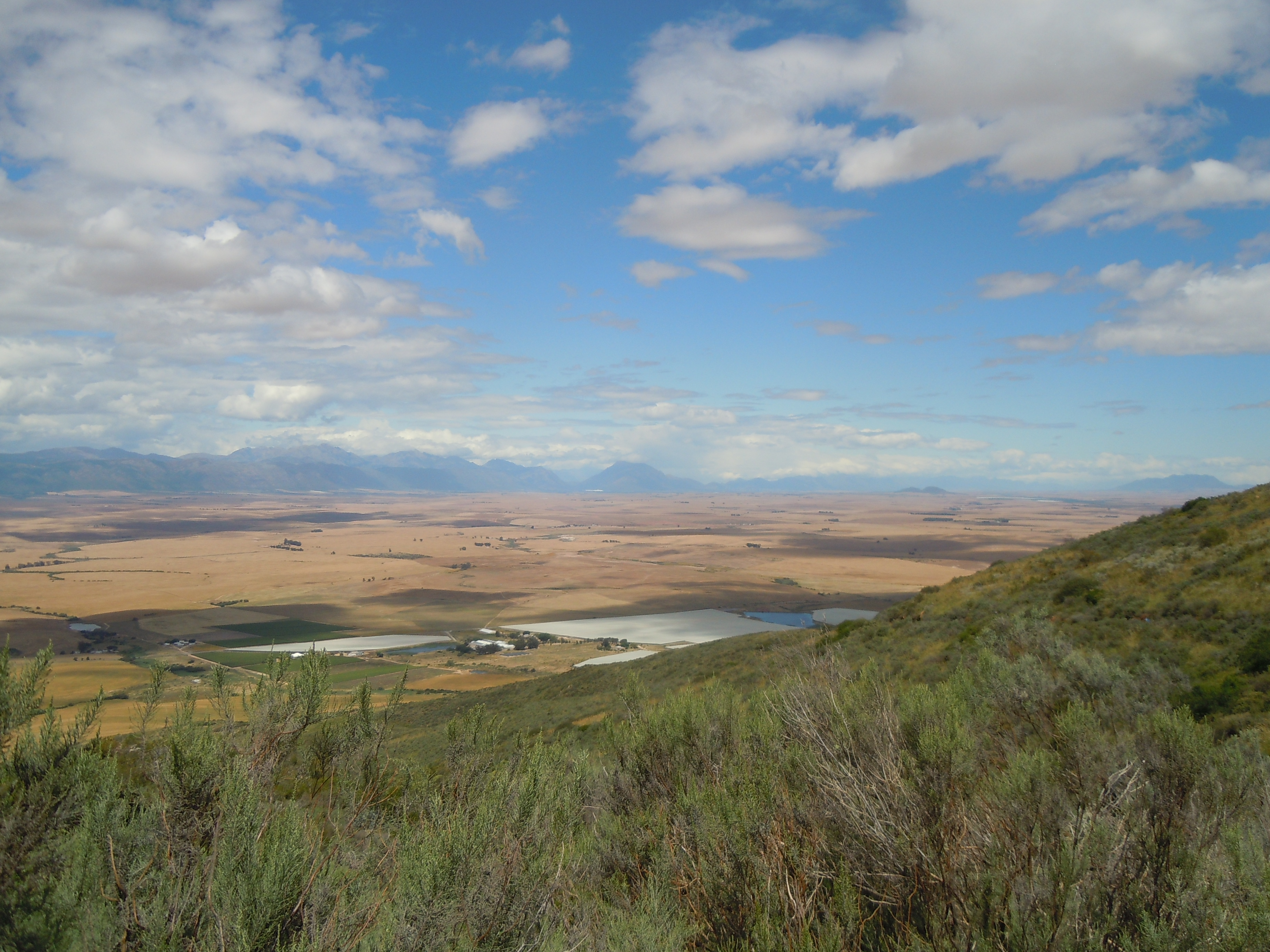
View from Vasvat Draai

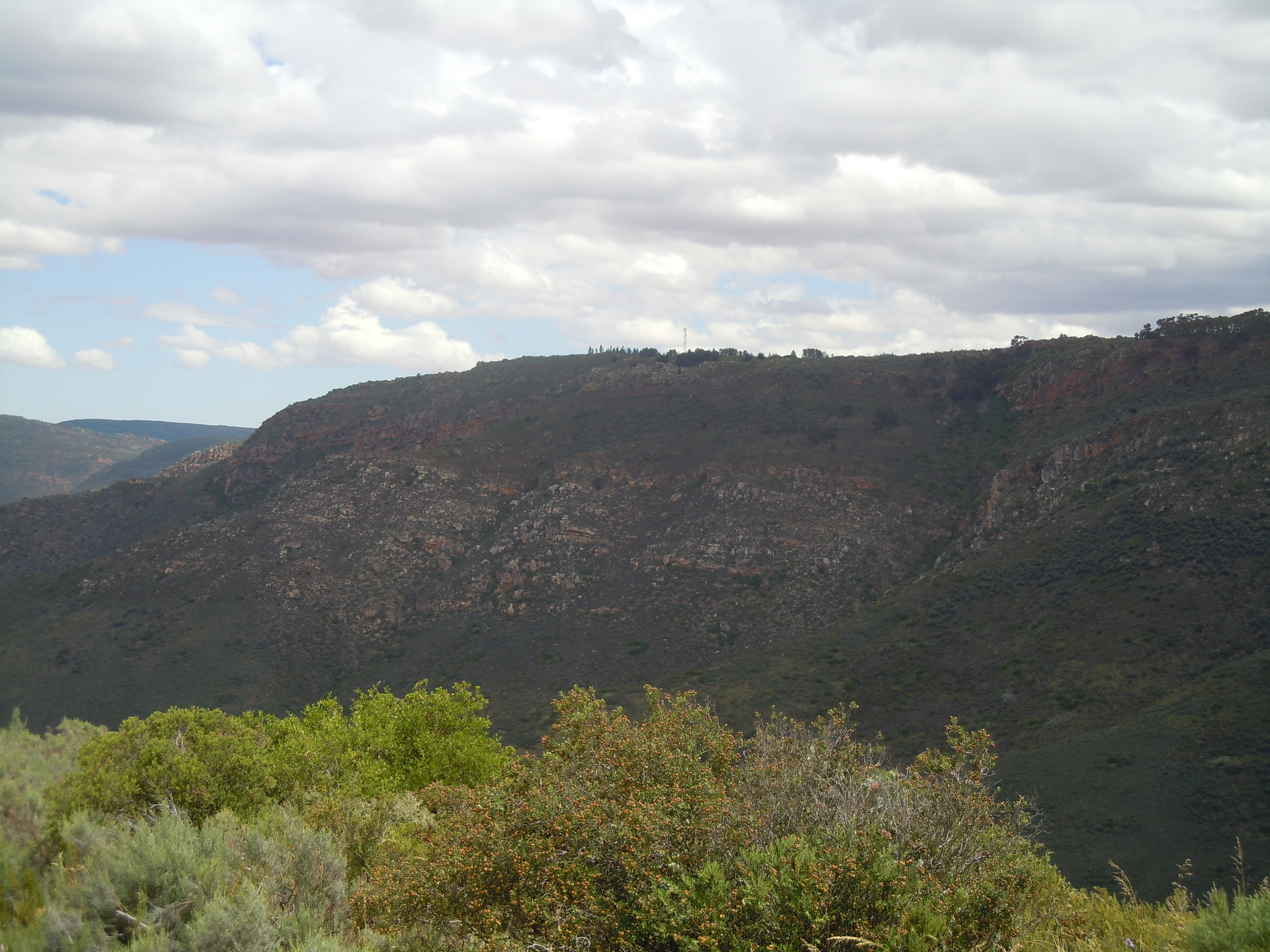
View from Die Baken

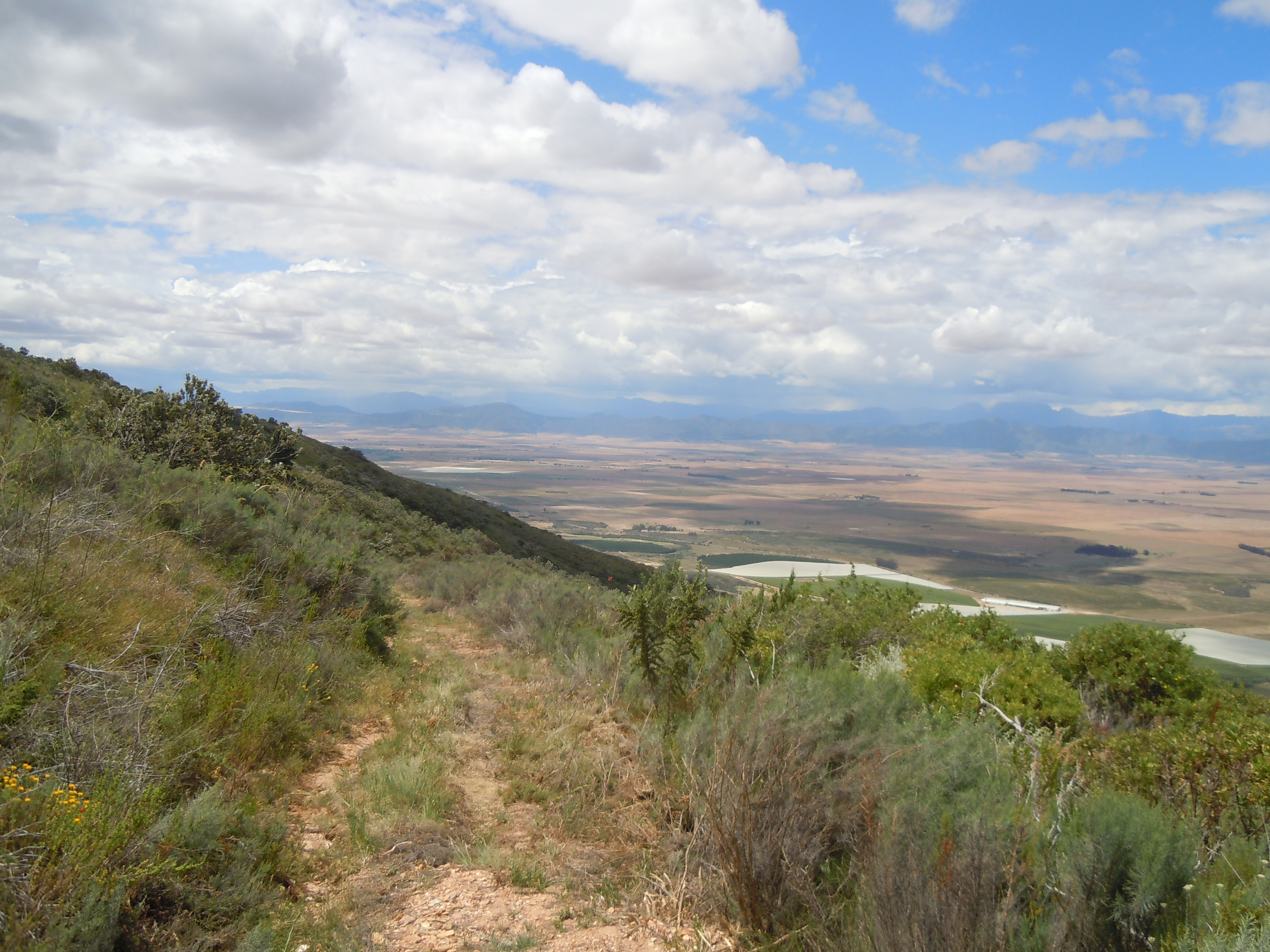
Second View from Die Baken

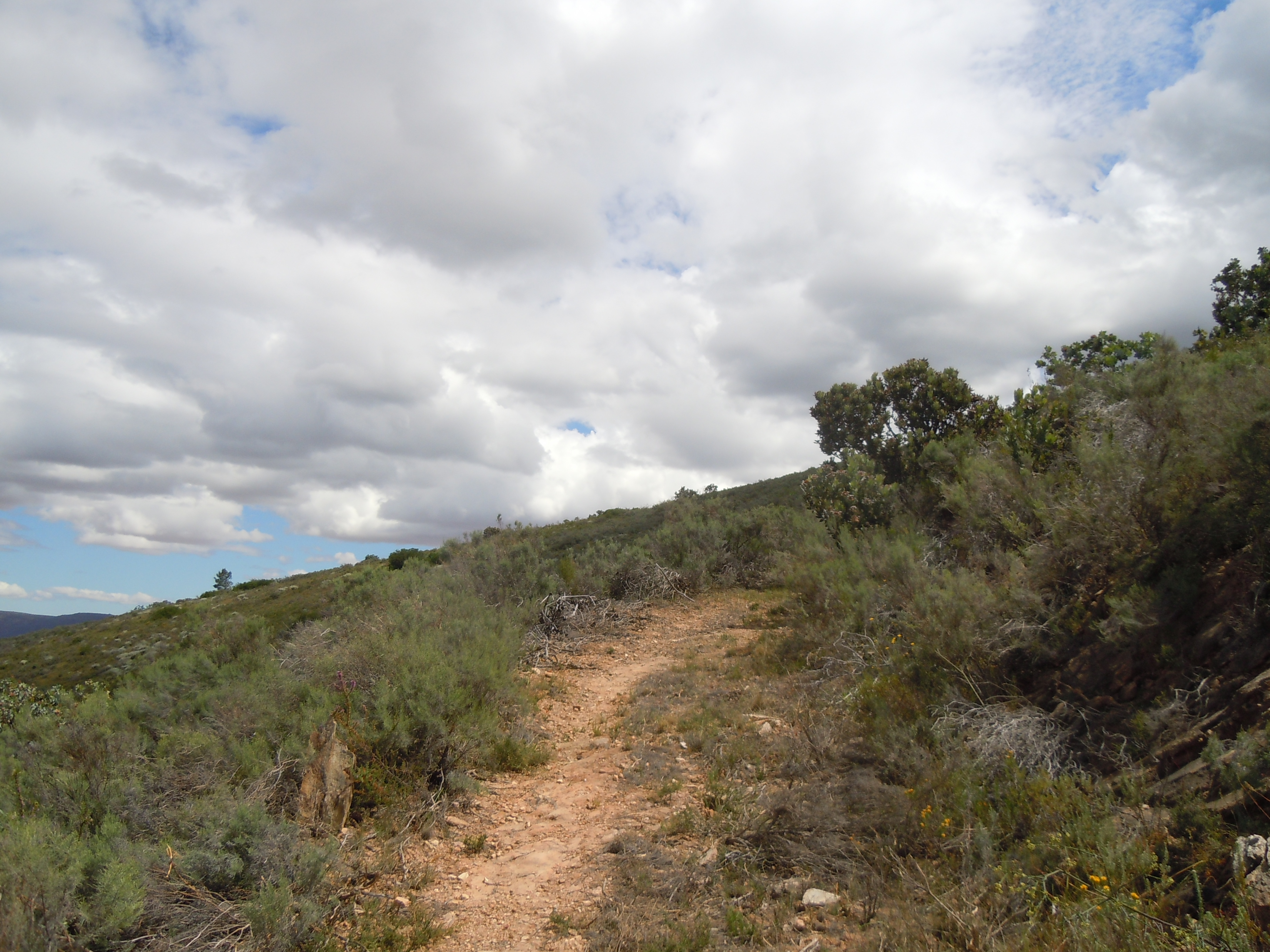
Third View from Die Baken

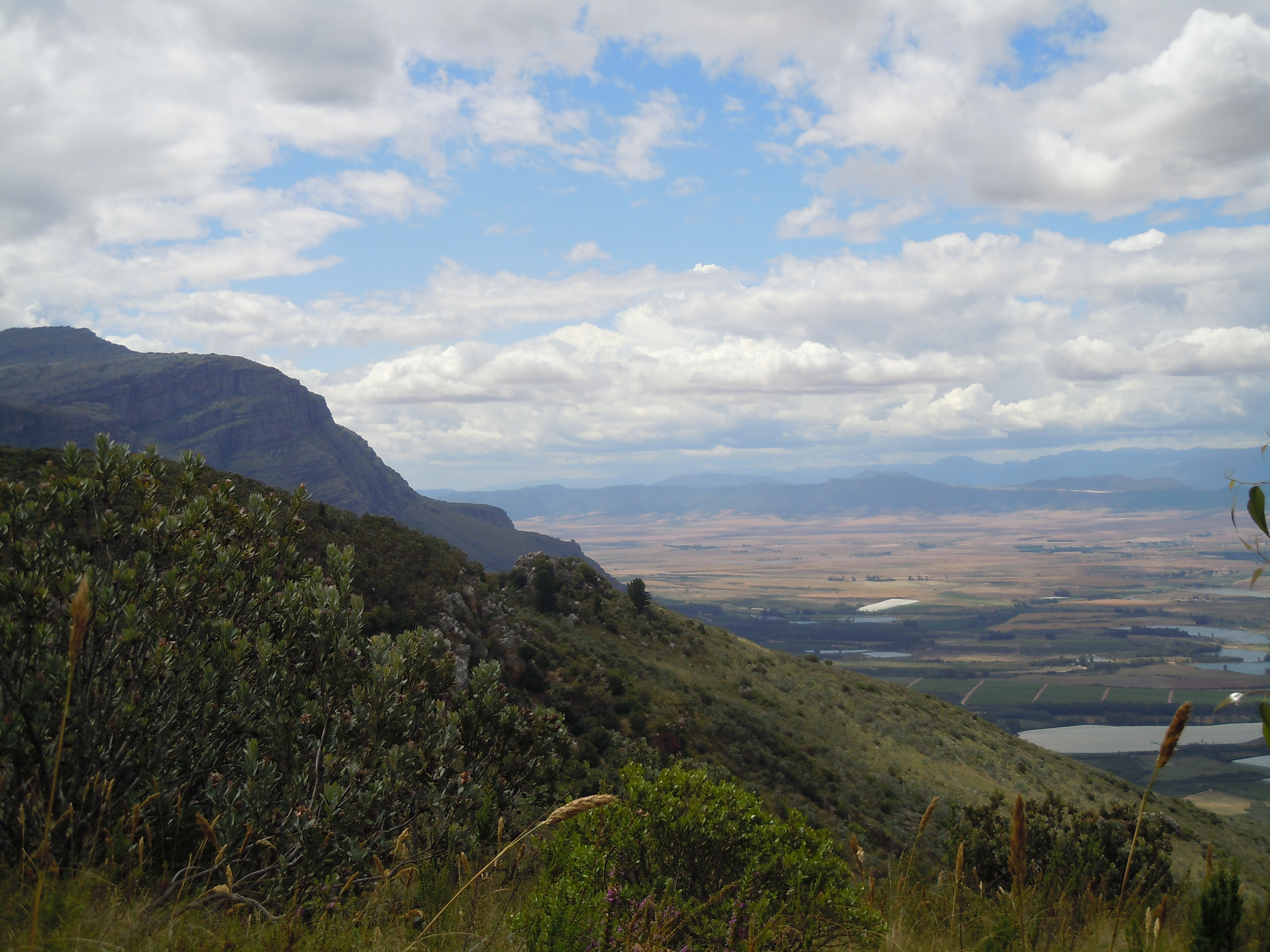
View from Klipoort

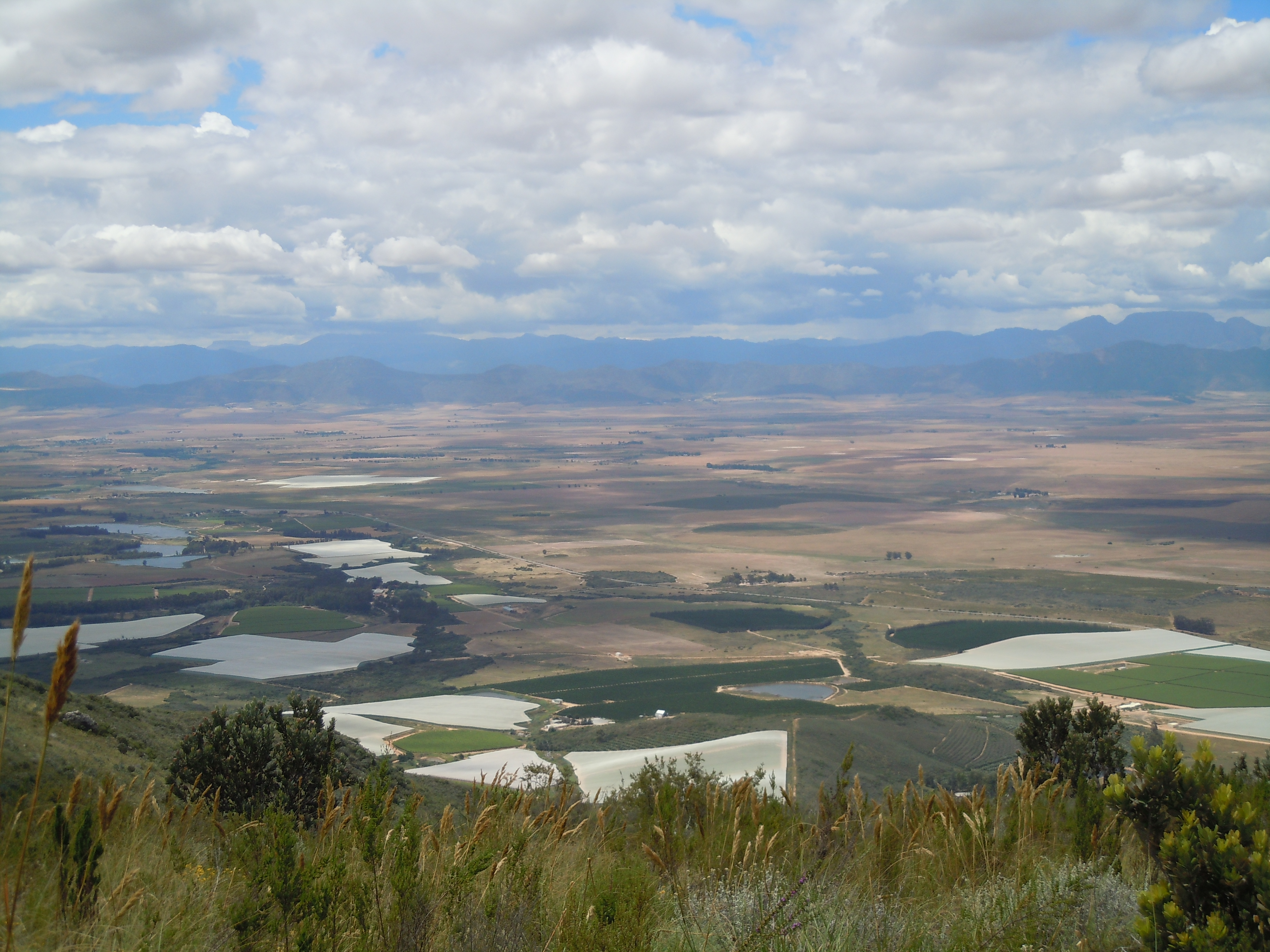
Second View from Klipoort

== Photos from second pass ==
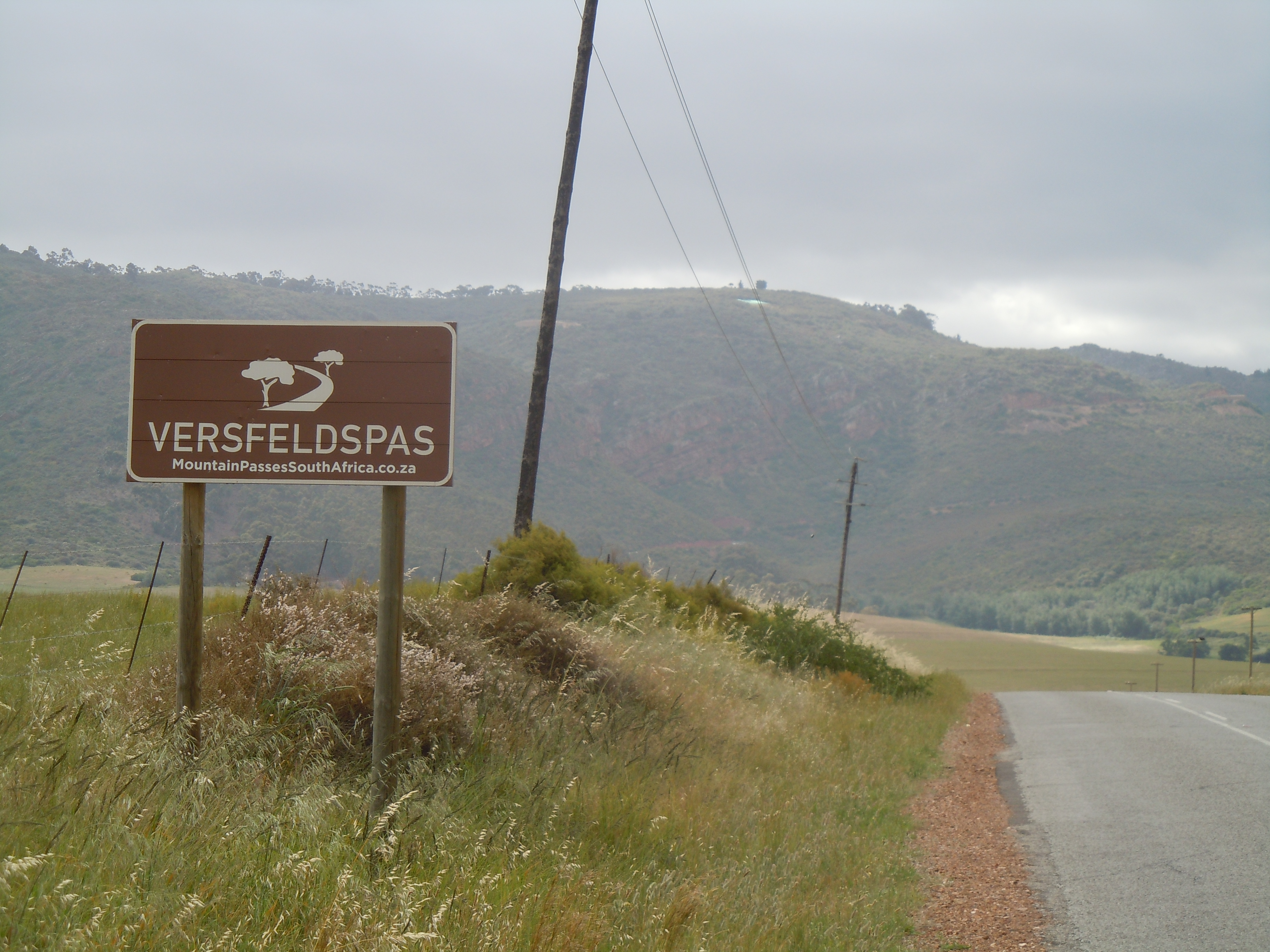
Versfeld pass tourist sign at the start of the pass

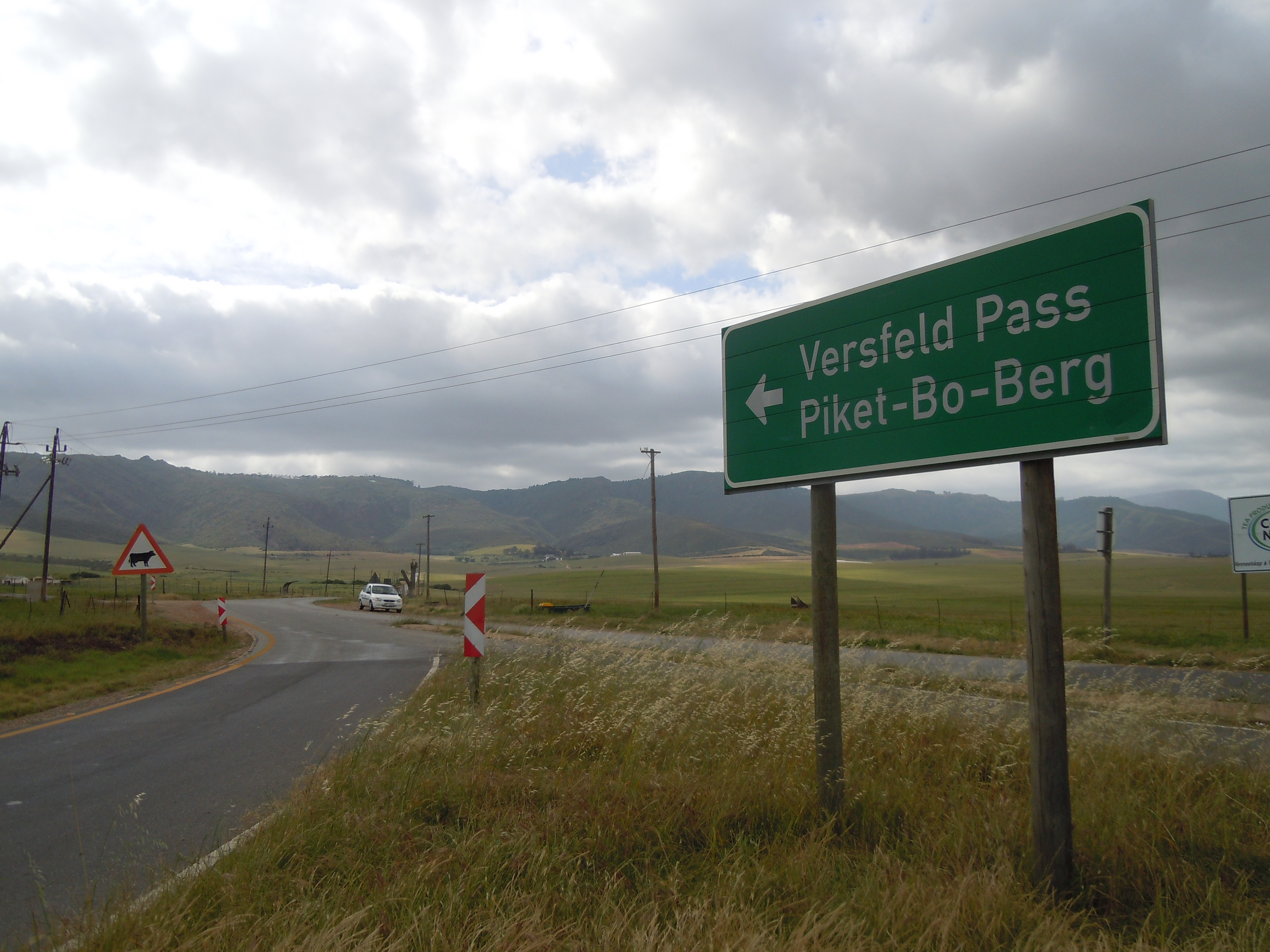
Versveld pass direction sign, 500m before the start of the pass

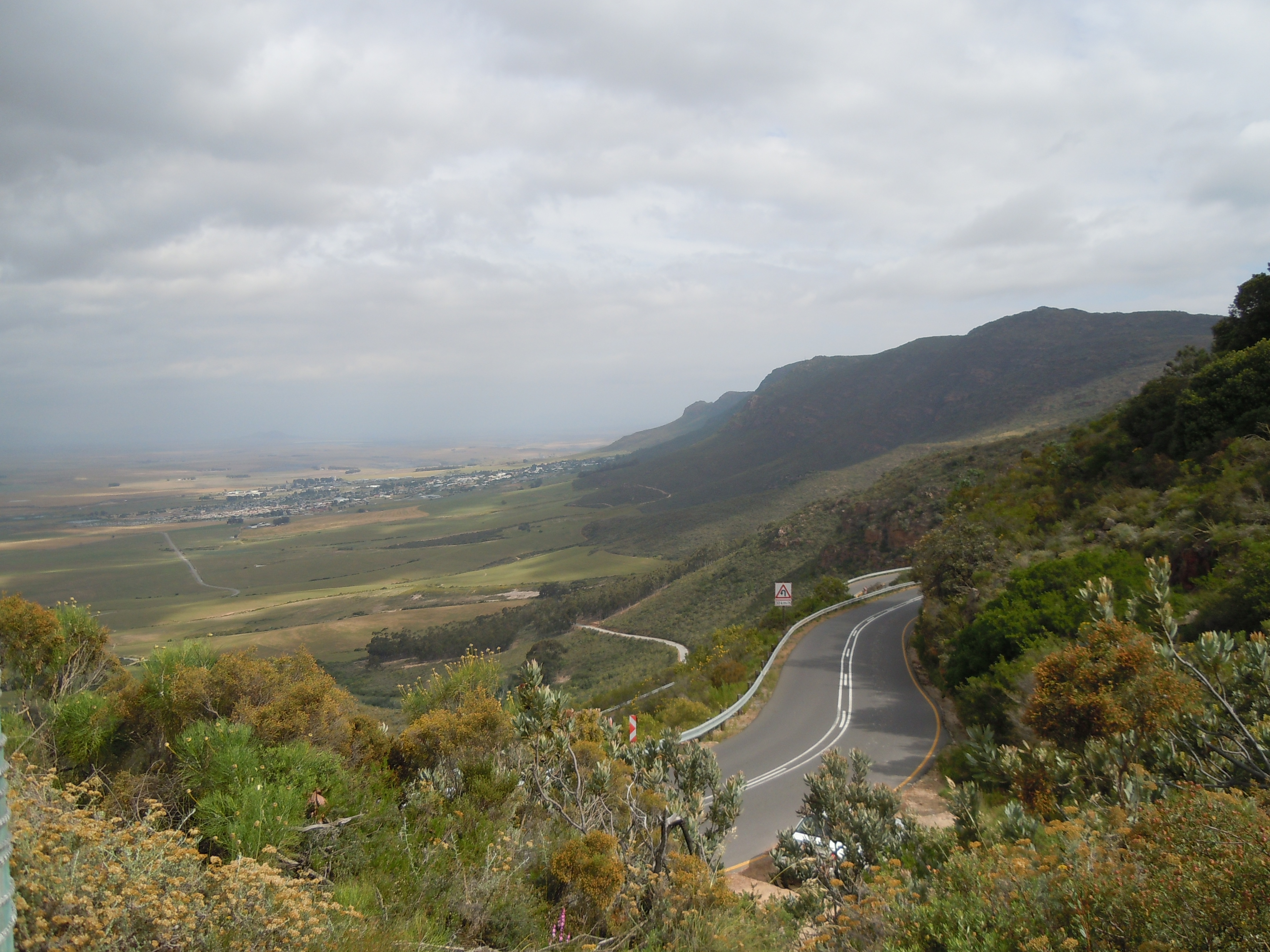
View from middle view point of Versfeld pass

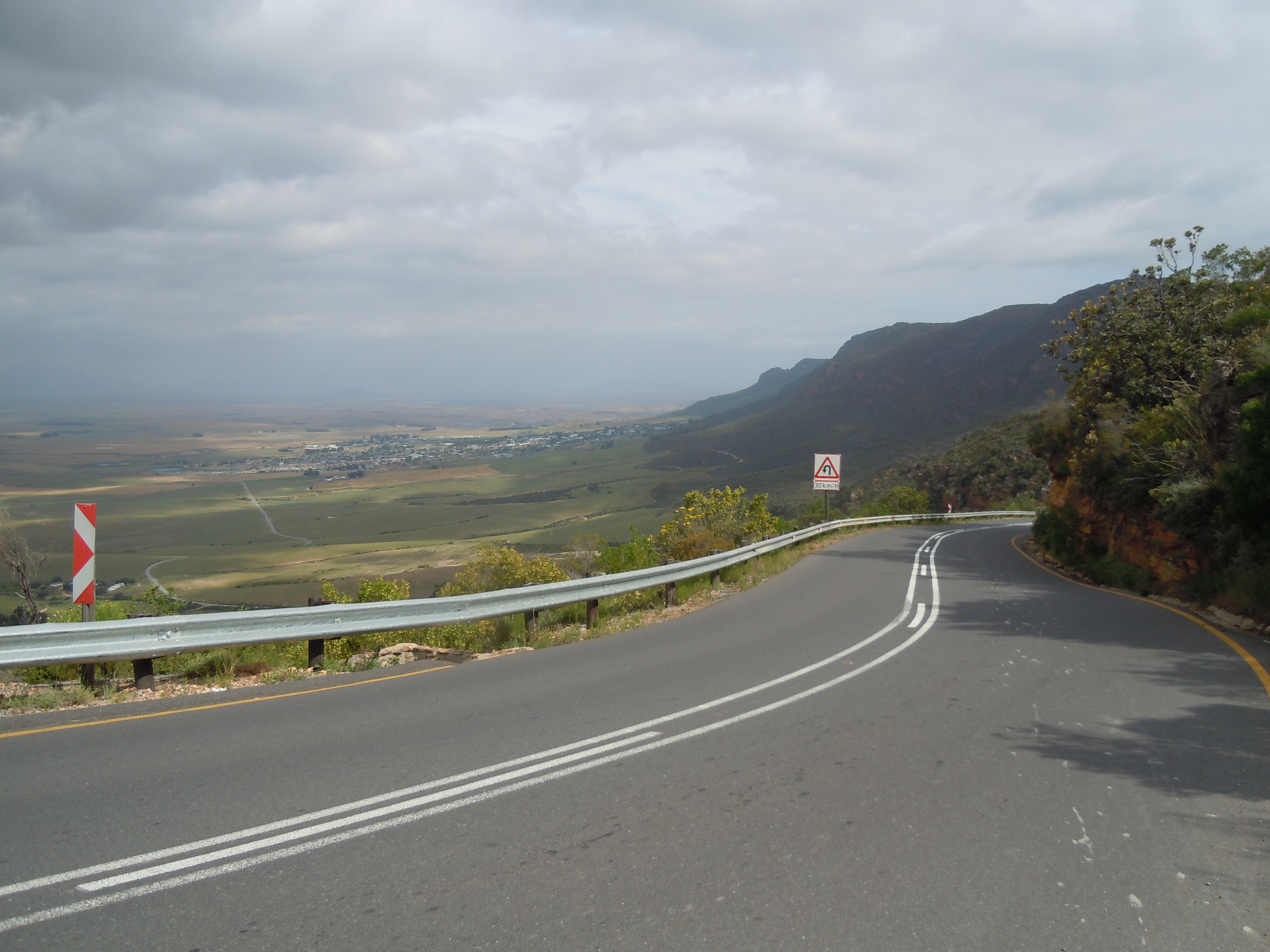
View from middle of pass

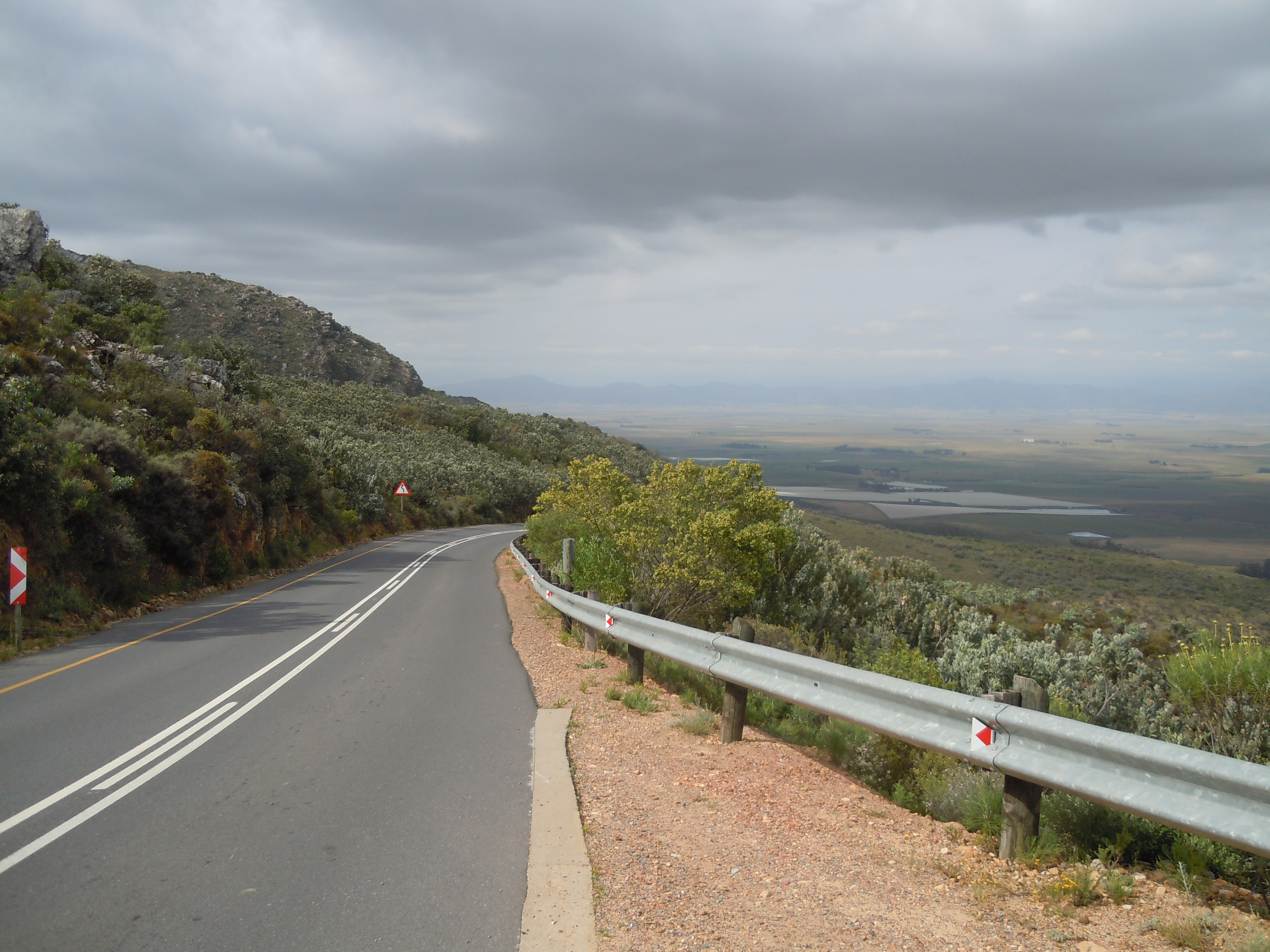
View form small stop point near top

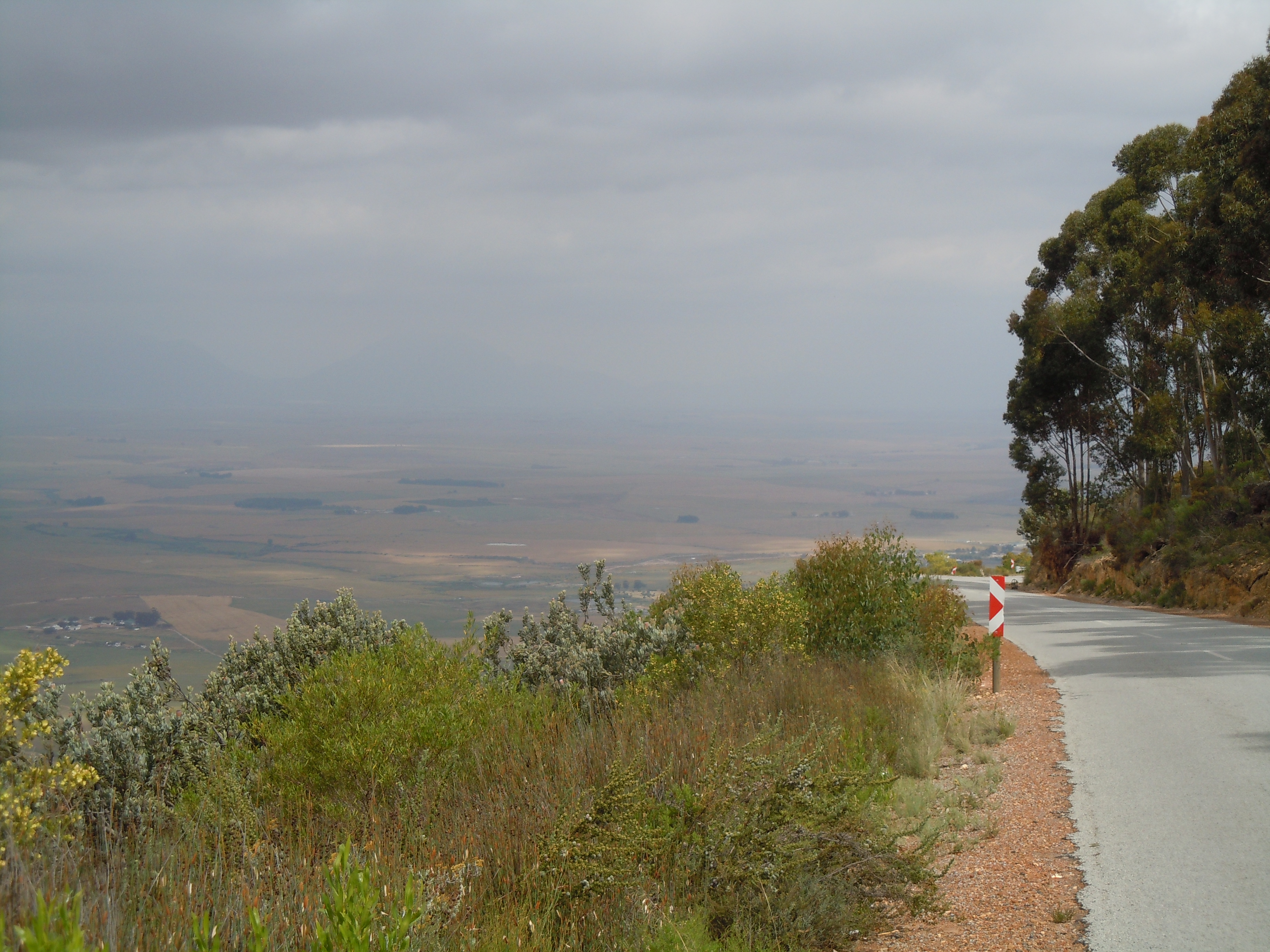
View from top of pass

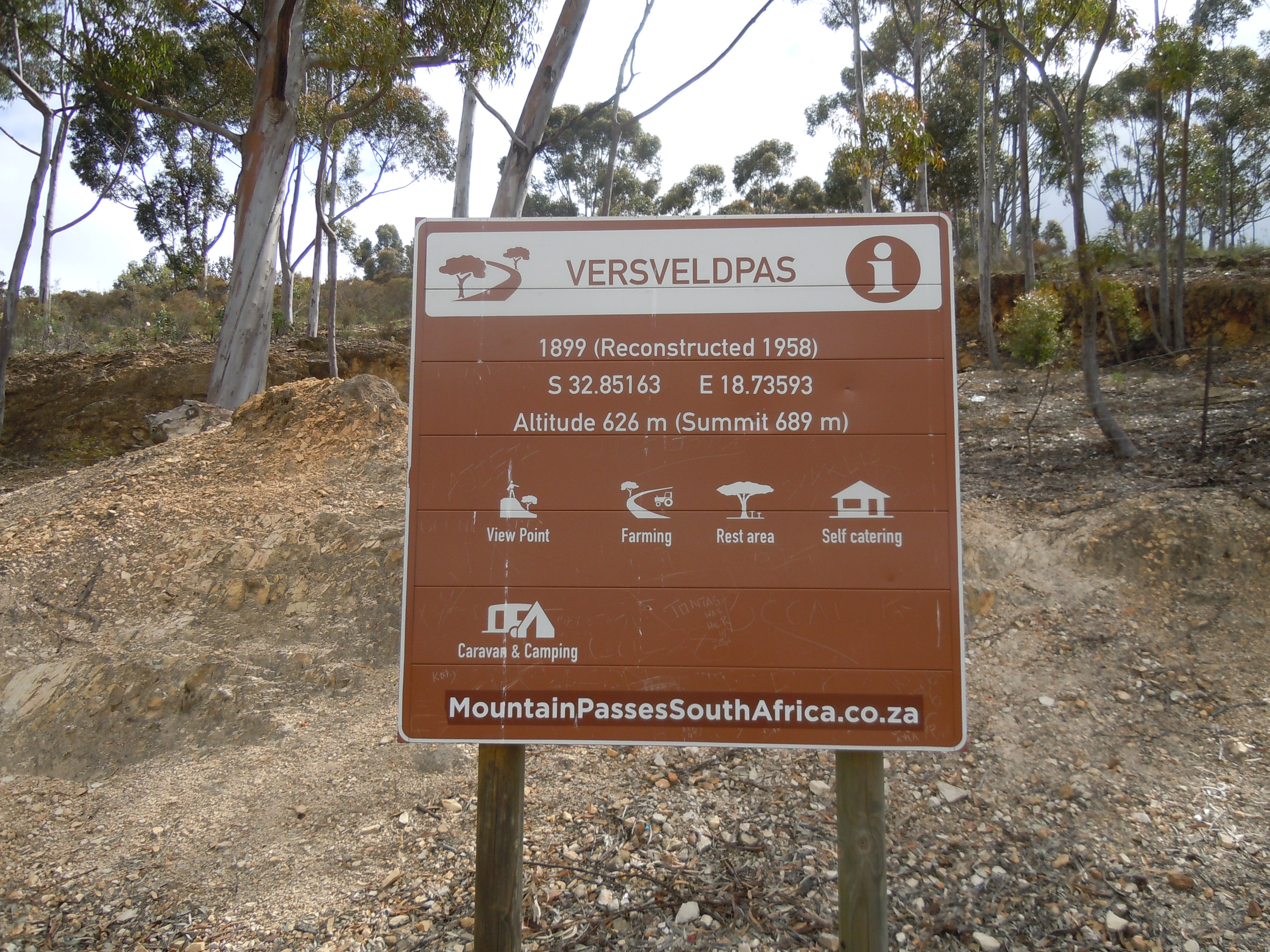
Versfeld pass tourist sign at the top viewpoint of pass
