= Piketberg Mountain Range =

Mountain range in South Africa

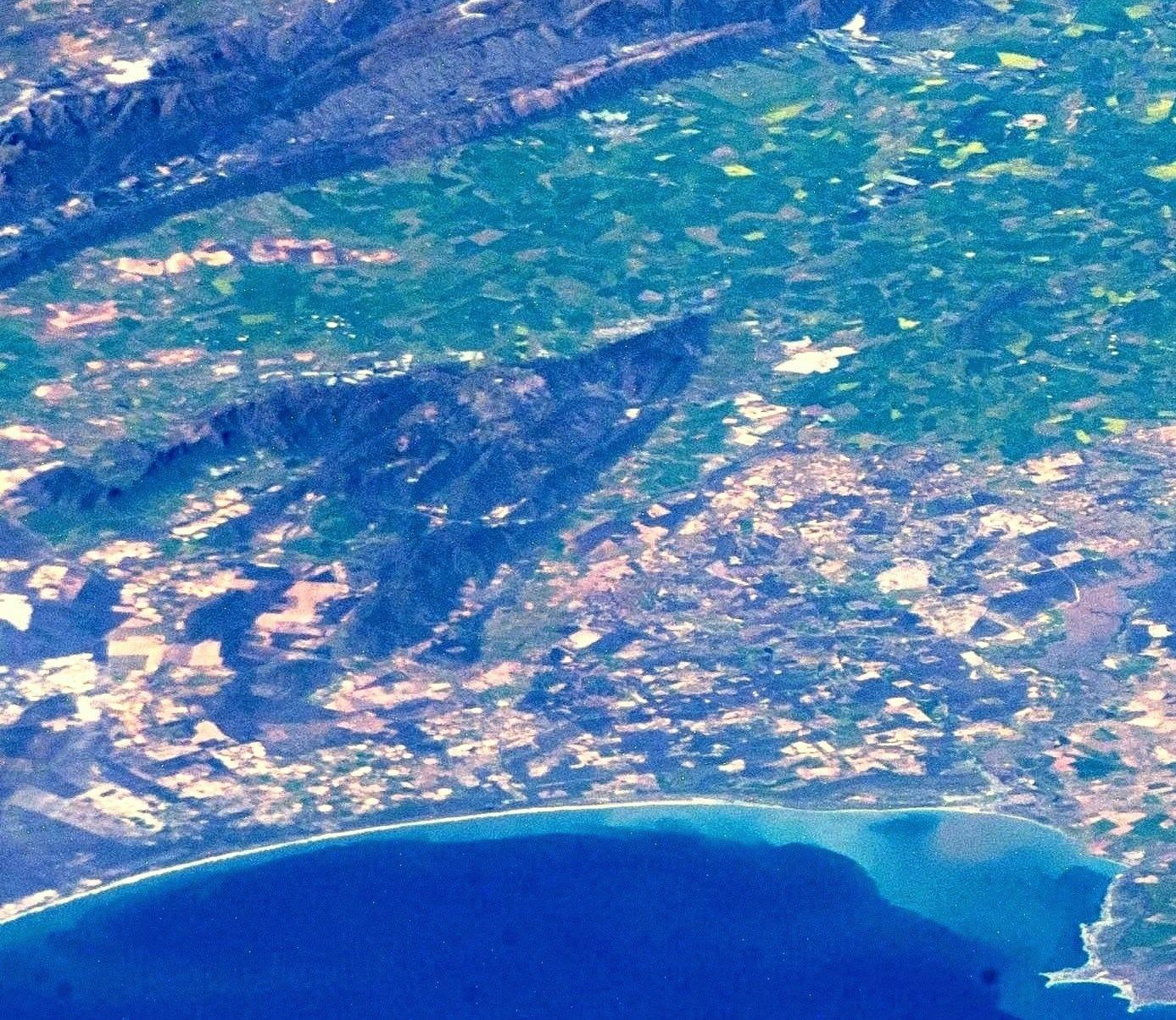
- The angular shape of the mountain as seen from the northwest, from the International Space Station

Highest point
- Elevation: 1,459 m (4,787 ft)
- Coordinates: 32°47′S 18°41′E

Naming
- Language of name: Afrikaans

Geography
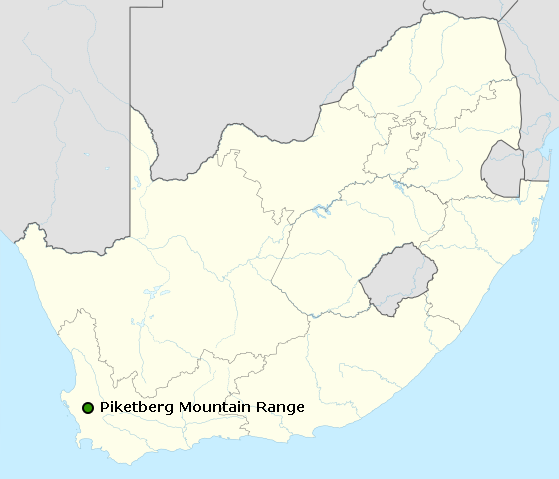
- Location: South Africa

Geology
- Mountain type: Table Mountain Sandstone

The Piketberg Mountain Range is a mountain range located in the Swartland (Black land) region of the Western Cape in South Africa.

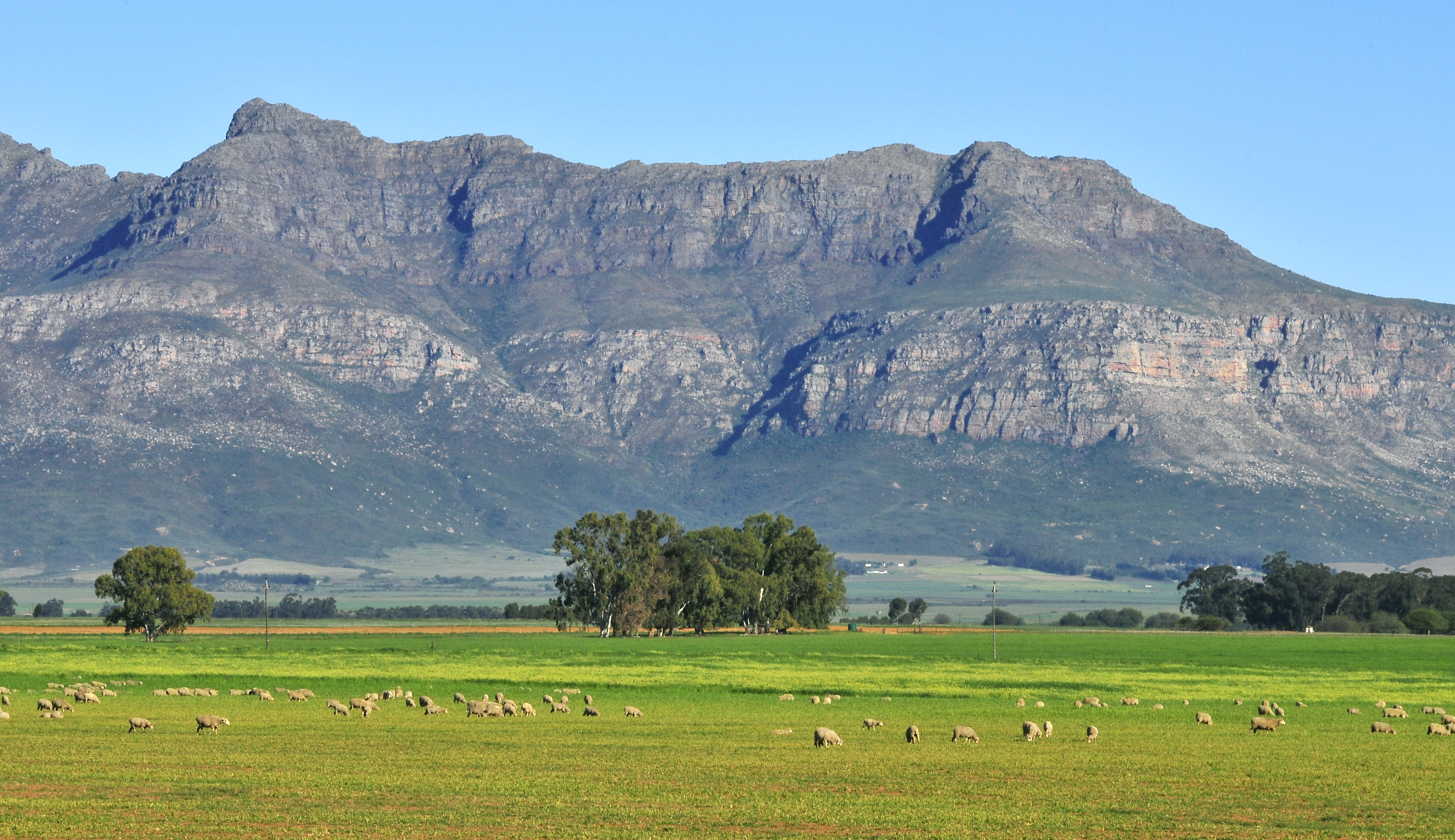
Image of the Piketberg mountains from a south-easterly perspective.

The mountain range is made up of low mountains primarily composed of Table Mountain Sandstone. It is a mountain range, which stands alone, an island bordered by only three towns – Aurora to the West, Redelinghuys to the North and Piketberg on its Eastern slopes. It is accessed by the Versfeld Pass.

== Etymology ==
The name originates from the old Dutch word 'picquet' as a small military outpost or 'pickets' were posted here in the 1670s to protect the farmers from cattle rustling raids by the Kogikwa Khoikhoi led by Gonnema.

Another possible source of Piketberg's name could be related to the French card game piquet. According to folklore, a French refugee (or Huguenot) who lived on the side of the mountain often played rounds of Piquet with his wife. One day a French official tasked with the recording of the names of farms and their inhabitants visited them (he had apparently visited them a few times before, and each time they had been playing the game). After remarking that whenever he visited they were always playing piquet, he asked them what the name of their farm was. The Frenchman, who was supposedly Jaques Mouton, replied: "Eh bien, monsieur, écrivez Mont de Piquet" (Well then sir, let's write Piketberg.)
