= Laingsburg Local Municipality =

Laingsburg
- Local municipality
- Seal

- Location of Laingsburg Local Municipality within the Western Cape
- Coordinates: 33°15′S 21°00′E
- Country: South Africa
- Province: Western Cape
- District: Central Karoo
- Seat: Laingsburg
- Wards: 4

Government
  - Type: Municipal council
  - Mayor: Aletta Theron (Democratic Alliance)
  - Deputy Mayor: Lindi Potgieter

Area
  - Total: 8,784 km^{2} (3,392 sq mi)

Population (2022)
  - Total: 11,366
  - Density: 1.294/km^{2} (3.351/sq mi)

Racial makeup (2011)
  - Black African: 3.5%
  - Coloured: 87.5%
  - Indian/Asian: 0.5%
  - White: 7.6%

First languages (2011)
  - Afrikaans: 94.3%
  - English: 1.7%
  - Xhosa: 1.2%
  - Other: 2.8%
- Time zone: UTC+2 (SAST)
- Municipal code: WC051

Laingsburg Municipality (Afrikaans: Laingsburg Munisipaliteit) is a local municipality located in the Western Cape province of South Africa. As of 2022, the population is 11,366. Its municipality code is WC051.

== Geography ==
The municipality covers an area of 8,784 square kilometres (3,392 sq mi) on the south-western edge of the Great Karoo. The southern edge of the municipality lies along the Anysberg and Swartberg mountains, while its northern edge is the provincial border with the Northern Cape. It abuts on the Beaufort West and Prince Albert Municipalities to the east, the Kannaland Municipality to the south, the Langeberg, Breede Valley and Witzenberg Municipalities to the west, and the Karoo Hoogland Municipality to the north.

According to the 2022 census, the population of the municipality was 11,366 people, increasing at an annual rate of 3.1% from 2011. 87.5% of the population is "Coloured," 7.6% identified as "White," and "Black Africans" were 3.5%.

The principal settlement in the municipality is the town of Laingsburg, which as of 2011 has a population of 5,667. West of Laingsburg is the village of Matjiesfontein, population 422.

== History ==
At the end of the apartheid era, the area that is today the Laingsburg Local Municipality formed part of the Central Karoo Regional Services Council (RSC). The town of Laingsburg was governed by a municipal council elected by the white residents while the coloured residents were governed by a management committee subordinate to the white council.

After the national elections of 1994 a process of local government transformation began, in which negotiations were held between the existing local authorities, political parties, and local community organisations. As a result of these negotiations the municipality and the management committee were dissolved, and the Laingsburg Transitional Local Council (TLC) was established to replace them in December 1994.

The TLC was initially made up of members nominated by the various parties to the negotiations, until May 1996 when elections were held. At the time of these elections the Central Karoo District Council was established in place of the Central Karoo RSC, and transitional representative councils (TRCs) were elected to represent rural areas outside the TLCs on the District Council. The area that was to become Laingsburg Local Municipality was covered by the Laingsburg TRC.

At the local elections of December 2000 the TLC and TRC were both dissolved and the Laingsburg Local Municipality was established as a single local authority. At the same election the Central Karoo District Council was dissolved and replaced by the Central Karoo District Municipality.

== Politics ==
The municipal council consists of ten members elected by mixed-member proportional representation. Five councillors are elected by first-past-the-post voting in five wards, while the remaining five are chosen from party lists so that the total number of party representatives is proportional to the number of votes received.

The following table shows the results of the 2026 election.

Party	Ward			List			Total seats
Party	Votes	%	Seats	Votes	%	Seats	Total seats
ActionSA	895	26.84	2	881	26.34	1	3
Democratic Alliance	837	25.10	1	856	25.59	2	3
African National Congress	828	24.84	2	808	24.16	0	2
People's Movement for Change	282	8.46	0	300	8.97	1	1
Patriotic Alliance	232	6.96	0	259	7.74	1	1
5 other parties	260	7.80	0	241	7.20	0	0
Total	3,334	100.00	5	3,345	100.00	5	10
Valid votes	3,334	99.02		3,345	99.14		
Invalid/blank votes	33	0.98		29	0.86		
Total votes	3,367	100.00		3,374	100.00		
Registered voters/turnout	5,288	63.67		5,288	63.80		
