= Umsinde Emoyeni Wind Power Station =

Wind Farm in South Africa

- Country: South Africa
- Location: Murraysburg, Beaufort West; Central Karoo District; Western Cape Province
- Coordinates: 31°50′56″S 23°49′32″E
- Status: Under construction
- Construction began: June 2024
- Commission date: Q4 2026 Expected
- Owner: African Infrastructure Investment Managers (AIIM)
- Operator: "Umsinde Emoyeni Power Consortium"

Wind farm
- Type: Onshore

Power generation
- Nameplate capacity: 140 MW

The Umsinde Emoyeni Wind Power Station (UEWPS), is a 140 MW wind power plant under construction in South Africa. The power station is under development by a consortium comprising (i) African Clean Energy Developments (ACED) and (ii) Energy Infrastructure Management Services (EIMS Africa). Both entities are subsidiaries of African Infrastructure Investment Managers (AIIM), an asset manager entity headquartered in Cape Town, South Africa.

The power generated here is intended for sale to Sibanye-Stillwater, the South African mining conglomerate, to support its gold, platinum-group elements and related metals mining operations in South Africa. The power will be transmitted from the wind farm to the off-taker by Eskom, the national electricity utility company under a 20-year power purchase agreement (PPA) and a long-term "wheeling agreement".

== Location ==
The power station is located near the town of Murraysburg, in Beaufort West, in Central Karoo District in extreme northeastern Western Cape Province, close to its border with the Northern Cape Province of South Africa. Murraysburg is located approximately 619 kilometres (385 mi), by road, northeast of Cape Town, the provincial capital.

== Overview ==
The design calls for a wind farm with generation capacity of 140 megawatts.

== Developers ==
The table below illustrates the ownership of this power station. The owner(s) are expected to form a special purpose vehicle (SPV) company to own, design, fund, build, operate and maintain the wind farm. For descriptive purposes, we will refer to the SPV company as Umsinde Emoyeni Power Consortium.

Shareholding In Umsinde Emoyeni Power Consortium
Rank	Shareholder	Domicile	Percentage	Notes
1	African Clean Energy Developments (ACED)	South Africa		
2	Energy Infrastructure Management Services (EIMS Africa)	South Africa		
3	Reatile Renewables Pty Limited	South Africa		
	Total		100.00	

== Funding and time table ==
African Infrastructure Investment Managers (AIIM) are funding the renewable energy project. AIIM is the parent entity of the two main shareholders, ACED and EIMS Africa. The project received financial support from Old Mutual Alternative Investments (OMAI)’s IDEAS Fund and from a syndicated loan arranged by Rand Merchant Bank. Construction is expected to start in June 2024 with commercial commissioning planned in the fourth quarter of 2026.

== Other considerations ==
With the attainment of financial closure for Umsinde Emoyeni Wind Farm, Sibanye-Stillwater has attained 407 MW of green renewable energy for its exclusive use, in its decarbonization and greening efforts. The 407 MW mitigates 24 percent of the miner's carbon footprint, equivalent to approximately 1,450,000 tonnes of CO2 annually, beginning in January 2027. Sibanye-Stillwater still plans to increase this portfolio of renewable green power sources to 600 MW, as it progresses towards total carbon neutrality by 2040.

== See also ==
- List of power stations in South Africa
- Khangela Emoyeni Wind Power Station
