= Khangela Emoyeni Wind Power Station =

Wind farm in South Africa

- Country: South Africa
- Location: Murraysburg, Beaufort West, Central Karoo District, Western Cape, South Africa
- Coordinates: 31°50′56″S 23°49′32″E
- Status: Under construction
- Owner: Khangela Emoyeni Wind Farm (Pty) Limited

Power generation
- Units operational: 32 x 4.5 MW
- Nameplate capacity: 144 MW

The Khangela Emoyeni Wind Power Station is a 144 megawatts wind power energy project in South Africa. The power station is owned by and is under development by a consortium comprising (a) African Clean Energy Developments (ACED) and (b) Energy Infrastructure Management Services (EIMS Africa). Both entities are subsidiaries of African Infrastructure Investment Managers (AIIM), an asset manager entity headquartered in Cape Town, South Africa.

The power generated here is intended for sale to Richards Bay Minerals (RBM), the South African subsidiary of the international mining conglomerate Rio Tinto, to support its mining operations in South Africa. The power will be transmitted from the wind farm to the off-taker by Eskom, the national electricity utility company under a 20-year power purchase agreement (PPA) and a long-term "wheeling agreement".

== Location ==
The power station is located near the town of Murraysburg, in Beaufort West, in Central Karoo District in extreme northeastern Western Cape Province, close to its border with the Northern Cape Province of South Africa. Murraysburg is located approximately 619 kilometres (385 mi), by road, northeast of Cape Town, the provincial capital of Western Cape.

== Overview ==
The design calls for 32 wind motors each rated at 4.5 megawatts and individually mounted on a pylon, for a total generating capacity of 144 megawatts or approximately 460 GWh of annual production. The engineering, procurement and construction (EPC) contract was awarded to Vestas, the Demark-based multinational manufacturer, seller, installer, and servicer of wind turbines. The contract calls for the supply, installation and 10-year maintenance of the thirty-two V163-4.5 MW wind turbines.

== Construction and timeline ==
Delivery of the wind turbines is planned during the first half of 2025. Construction is expected to conclude during the first half of 2026.

== Developers ==
The table below illustrates the ownership of this power station. The owners have formed a special purpose vehicle (SPV) company to own, design, fund, build, operate and maintain the wind farm. The SPV company is called Khangela Emoyeni Wind Farm (Pty) Limited.

Shareholding In Khangela Emoyeni Wind Farm (Pty) Limited
Rank	Shareholder	Domicile	Percentage	Notes
1	African Clean Energy Developments (ACED)	South Africa		
2	Energy Infrastructure Management Services (EIMS Africa)	South Africa		
3	Reatile Renewables Pty Limited	South Africa		
	Total		100.00	

== Funding ==
Rand Merchant Bank is arranging all the necessary funding for this renewable energy project.

== See also ==
- Umsinde Emoyeni Wind Power Station
