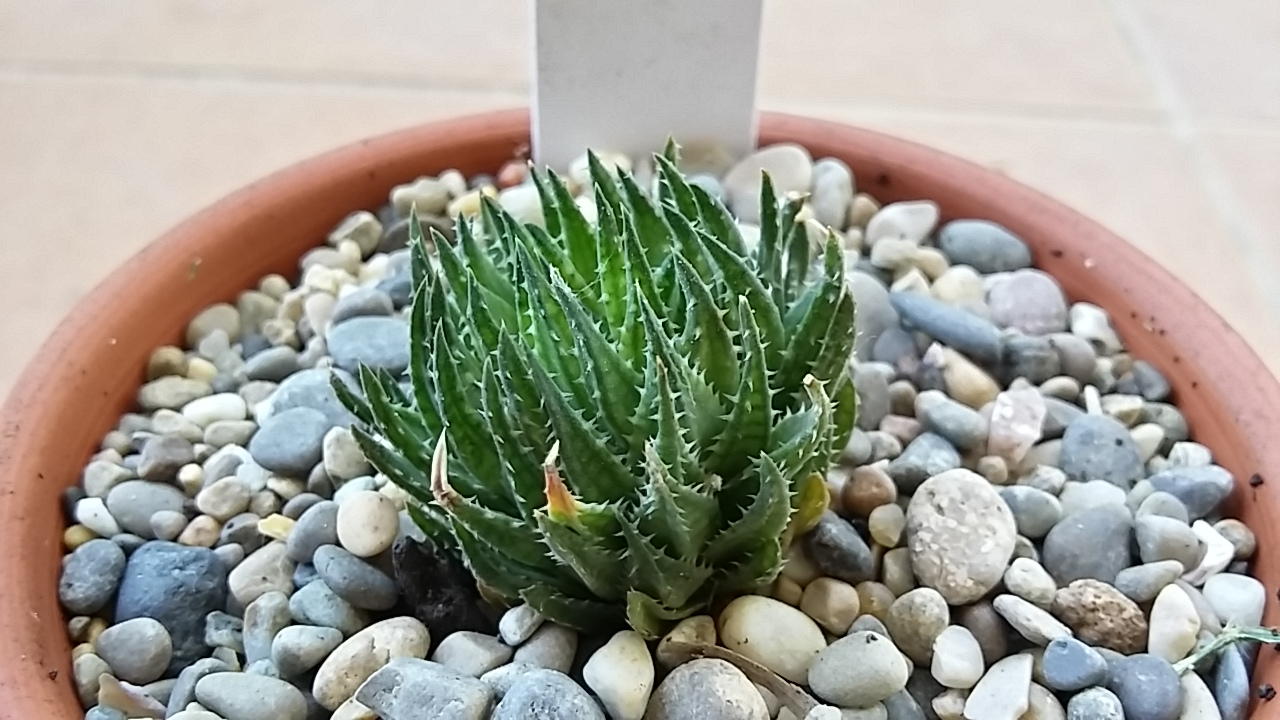

Scientific classification
- Kingdom: Plantae
- Clade: Tracheophytes
- Clade: Angiosperms
- Clade: Monocots
- Order: Asparagales
- Family: Asphodelaceae
- Subfamily: Asphodeloideae
- Genus: Haworthia
- Species: H. pulchella

Binomial name
- Haworthia pulchella M.B.Bayer

Synonyms
- Haworthia chloracantha var. pulchella (M.B.Bayer) Halda

= Haworthia pulchella =

Species of succulent

Haworthia pulchella is a perennial succulent belonging to the genus Haworthia and is part of the fynbos. The species is endemic to the Western Cape and occurs from Touws River to Laingsburg and on the Anysberg.

== Varieties ==
There are two varieties:

- Haworthia pulchella var. globifera M.B.Bayer
- Haworthia pulchella var. pulchella
