= Valley of Desolation =

Valley of Desolation may refer to:

- The Valley of Desolation (South Africa) in the Karoo region of South Africa
- The Valley of Desolation on the Bolton Abbey Estate in North Yorkshire, United Kingdom
