= Beaufort West Local Municipality =

Local municipality in Western Cape, South Africa

Beaufort West Beaufort-Wes
- Local municipality
- Seal

- Location of Beaufort West Local Municipality within the Western Cape
- Coordinates: 32°20′S 22°45′E
- Country: South Africa
- Province: Western Cape
- District: Central Karoo
- Seat: Beaufort West
- Wards: 7

Government
  - Type: Municipal council
  - Mayor: Georgina Juliana Duimpies (DA)
  - Deputy Mayor: October Haarvoor (DA)
  - Speaker: Elvico Links (DA)

Area
  - Total: 21,917 km^{2} (8,462 sq mi)

Population (2022)
  - Total: 72,972
  - Density: 3.3295/km^{2} (8.6233/sq mi)

Racial makeup (2022)
  - African: 15.7%
  - Coloured: 77.5%
  - Indian/Asian: 0.4%
  - White: 5.0%

First languages (2011)
  - Afrikaans: 84.3%
  - Xhosa: 10.7%
  - English: 2.5%
  - Other: 2.5%
- Time zone: UTC+2 (SAST)
- Municipal code: WC053

Beaufort West Municipality (Afrikaans: Beaufort-Wes Munisipaliteit; Xhosa: uMasipala wase Bhobhofolo) is a local municipality located in the Western Cape province of South Africa. As of 2011, the population is 49,586. Its municipality code is WC053.

== Geography ==
The municipality covers an area of 21,917 square kilometres (8,462 sq mi), making it the largest local municipality in the Western Cape and the sixth-largest in South Africa. It is located in the furthest northeastern part of the province in the Great Karoo. It abuts on the Karoo Hoogland Municipality to the northwest, the Ubuntu Municipality to the north, the Dr Beyers Naudé Municipality to the southeast, the Prince Albert Municipality to the south and the Laingsburg Municipality to the southwest.

== Demographics ==
At the time of the South African National Census of 2022, the population of the municipality was 72,972 people, a 47.2% increase from 2011. 77.5% of the population identified as "Coloured," 15.7% as "Black African," and 5% White.

According to the 2011 census the municipality has a population of 49,586 people in 13,089 households. Of this population, 73.5% describe themselves as "Coloured", 16.3% as "African", and 9.2% as "White". The first language of 84.3% of the population is Afrikaans, while 10.7% speak Xhosa and 2.5% speak English.

The main town in the municipality is Beaufort West, which as of 2011 has a population of 34,085. Murraysburg (pop. 5,069) is situated in the far east of the municipality. Nelspoort (pop. 1,699) is situated northeast of Beaufort West, while Merweville (pop. 1,592) is in the far west of the municipality.

== History ==
At the end of the apartheid era, the area that is today the Beaufort West Local Municipality was divided between two Regional Services Councils (RSCs): the western part around Beaufort West formed part of the Central Karoo RSC, while the eastern part around Murraysburg formed part of the Kamdeboo RSC. The towns of Beaufort West and Murraysburg were governed by municipal councils elected by their white residents, while the coloured residents of the towns were governed by management committees subordinate to the white councils. Kwa-Mandlenkosi was governed by a town council established under the Black Local Authorities Act, 1982.

After the national elections of 1994 a process of local government transformation began, in which negotiations were held between the existing local authorities, political parties, and local community organisations. As a result of these negotiations, the existing local authorities were dissolved and transitional local councils (TLCs) were created for each town and village. In December 1994 the Beaufort West TLC replaced the Municipality of Beaufort West, Beaufort West Management Committee and Kwa-Mandlenkosi Town Council. In January 1994 the Murraysburg TLC replaced the Municipality of Murraysburg and Murraysburg Management Committee. In June 1995 the Murraysburg district was removed from the Kamdeboo RSC and added to the Central Karoo RSC.

The transitional councils were initially made up of members nominated by the various parties to the negotiations, until May 1996 when elections were held. At these elections the Central Karoo District Council was established, replacing the Central Karoo RSC. Transitional representative councils (TRCs) were also elected to represent rural areas outside the TLCs on the District Council; the area that was to become Beaufort West Local Municipality included Beaufort West and Murraysburg TRCs.

At the local elections of December 2000 the transitional councils were dissolved. The Central Karoo District Council was replaced by the Central Karoo District Municipality. The Beaufort West Local Municipality was established as a single local authority covering the area of the Beaufort West TLC and TRC, except for the Karoo National Park which became a District Management Area (DMA). The area of the Murraysburg TLC and TRC also became a DMA. In 2011 DMAs were abolished and these areas were included into the Beaufort West Local Municipality.

== Politics ==
The municipal council consists of thirteen members elected by mixed-member proportional representation. Seven councillors are elected by first-past-the-post voting in seven wards, while the remaining six are chosen from party lists so that the total number of party representatives is proportional to the number of votes received.

In the election of 4 November 2026 no party obtained a majority of seats on the council.

The following table shows the results of the 2026 election.

Party	Ward			List			Total seats
Party	Votes	%	Seats	Votes	%	Seats	Total seats
Democratic Alliance	4,840	29.93	4	4,933	30.47	0	4
African National Congress	4,043	25.00	3	4,038	24.94	0	3
Community First Party	1,386	8.57	0	1,377	8.50	1	1
Patriotic Alliance	1,342	8.30	0	1,375	8.49	1	1
People's Movement for Change	1,174	7.26	0	1,108	6.84	1	1
ActionSA	774	4.79	0	757	4.68	1	1
Activists for the Restoration of the Karoo	681	4.21	0	675	4.17	1	1
Karoo Democratic Force	586	3.62	0	591	3.65	1	1
9 other parties	1,343	8.31	0	1,338	8.26	0	0
Total	16,169	100.00	7	16,192	100.00	6	13
Valid votes	16,169	98.36		16,192	98.53		
Invalid/blank votes	269	1.64		242	1.47		
Total votes	16,438	100.00		16,434	100.00		
Registered voters/turnout	29,422	55.87		29,422	55.86		
