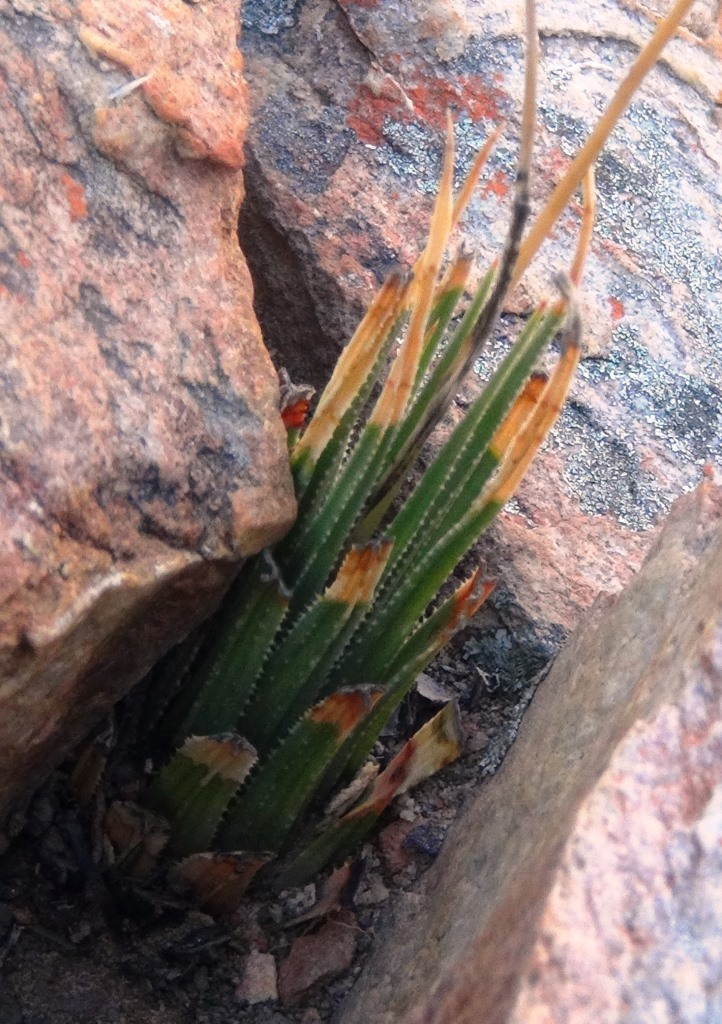

Scientific classification
- Kingdom: Plantae
- Clade: Tracheophytes
- Clade: Angiosperms
- Clade: Monocots
- Order: Asparagales
- Family: Asphodelaceae
- Subfamily: Asphodeloideae
- Genus: Haworthia
- Species: H. wittebergensis

Binomial name
- Haworthia wittebergensis W.F.Barker, (1942)

= Haworthia wittebergensis =

Species of succulent

Haworthia wittebergensis is a perennial succulent belonging to the genus Haworthia and is part of the fynbos. The species is endemic to the Western Cape and occurs from the Witteberg to Anysberg. It has a range of 305 km^{2} and is considered rare. Although it is collected illegally, the plant is still abundant.
