= Disa cochlearis =

Scientific classification
- Kingdom: Plantae
- Clade: Tracheophytes
- Clade: Angiosperms
- Clade: Monocots
- Order: Asparagales
- Family: Orchidaceae
- Subfamily: Orchidoideae
- Genus: Disa
- Species: D. cochlearis

Binomial name
- Disa cochlearis S.D.Johnson & Liltved

Synonyms
- Amphigena cochlearis (S.D.Johnson & Liltved) Szlach.

Species of flowering plant

Disa cochlearis is a perennial plant and geophyte belonging to the genus Disa and is part of the fynbos. The plant is endemic to the Western Cape and occurs on the Elandsberg, southeast of Laingsburg, where it grows on the south-facing slopes. There is only one population. The plant has no threats and the plant is considered rare.
