= Prince Albert Local Municipality elections =

Local elections in the Western Cape, South Africa

The Prince Albert Local Municipality council consists of ten members elected by mixed-member proportional representation. Five councillors are elected by first-past-the-post voting in five wards, while the remaining five are chosen from party lists so that the total number of party representatives is proportional to the number of votes received.

In the election of 4 November 2026 no party obtained a majority of seats.

== Results ==
The following table shows the composition of the council after past elections.

Event	ANC	DA	KGP	PA	Other	Total
2000 election	2	4	—	—	—	6
2002 floor-crossing	2	2	—	—	2	6
2006 election	3	3	—	—	0	6
2011 election	2	2	3	—	0	7
2016 election	2	3	2	—	0	7
2021 election	1	3	2	1	0	7
2026 election	1	4	—	5	0	10

== December 2000 election ==
The following table shows the results of the 2000 election.

Party	Votes	%	Seats
Democratic Alliance	2,349	63.32	4
African National Congress	1,361	36.68	2
Total	3,710	100.00	6
Valid votes	3,710	98.20	
Invalid/blank votes	68	1.80	
Total votes	3,778	100.00	
Registered voters/turnout	4,740	79.70	

=== October 2002 floor crossing ===
In terms of the Eighth Amendment of the Constitution and the judgment of the Constitutional Court in United Democratic Movement v President of the Republic of South Africa and Others, in the period from 8–22 October 2002 councillors had the opportunity to cross the floor to a different political party without losing their seats.

In the Prince Albert council, two councillors from the Democratic Alliance (DA) crossed to the New National Party, which had formerly been part of the DA.

Party	Seats before	Net change	Seats after
Democratic Alliance	4	▼2	2
African National Congress	2	0	2
New National Party	—	▲2	2

== March 2006 election ==
The following table shows the results of the 2006 election.

Party	Votes	%	Seats
African National Congress	2,011	51.91	3
Democratic Alliance	1,624	41.92	3
Independent Democrats	239	6.17	0
Total	3,874	100.00	6
Valid votes	3,874	99.13	
Invalid/blank votes	34	0.87	
Total votes	3,908	100.00	
Registered voters/turnout	5,542	70.52	

== May 2011 election ==
The following table shows the results of the 2011 election.

Party	Ward			List			Total seats
Party	Votes	%	Seats	Votes	%	Seats	Total seats
Karoo Gemeenskap Party	2,632	50.42	3	2,635	50.47	0	3
Democratic Alliance	1,336	25.59	0	1,334	25.55	2	2
African National Congress	1,231	23.58	1	1,252	23.98	1	2
Independent candidates	21	0.40	0				0
Total	5,220	100.00	4	5,221	100.00	3	7
Valid votes	5,220	98.83		5,221	98.96		
Invalid/blank votes	62	1.17		55	1.04		
Total votes	5,282	100.00		5,276	100.00		
Registered voters/turnout	6,566	80.44		6,566	80.35		

== August 2016 election ==
The following table shows the results of the 2016 election.

Party	Ward			List			Total seats
Party	Votes	%	Seats	Votes	%	Seats	Total seats
Democratic Alliance	1,848	33.56	1	1,845	33.49	2	3
Karoo Gemeenskap Party	1,759	31.95	2	1,823	33.09	0	2
African National Congress	1,775	32.24	1	1,709	31.02	1	2
Independent Civic Organisation of South Africa	50	0.91	0	50	0.91	0	0
Economic Freedom Fighters	37	0.67	0	45	0.82	0	0
Freedom Front Plus	37	0.67	0	37	0.67	0	0
Total	5,506	100.00	4	5,509	100.00	3	7
Valid votes	5,506	98.69		5,509	98.69		
Invalid/blank votes	73	1.31		73	1.31		
Total votes	5,579	100.00		5,582	100.00		
Registered voters/turnout	7,386	75.53		7,386	75.58		

== November 2021 election ==
The following table shows the results of the 2021 election.

Party	Ward			List			Total seats
Party	Votes	%	Seats	Votes	%	Seats	Total seats
Democratic Alliance	2,103	37.65	2	2,091	37.23	1	3
Karoo Gemeenskap Party	1,220	21.84	2	1,247	22.20	0	2
Patriotic Alliance	805	14.41	0	802	14.28	1	1
African National Congress	619	11.08	0	595	10.59	1	1
Karoo Democratic Force	226	4.05	0	294	5.24	0	0
United Community Front	276	4.94	0	236	4.20	0	0
Good	117	2.09	0	113	2.01	0	0
Spectrum National Party	101	1.81	0	109	1.94	0	0
Karoo Ontwikkelings Party	46	0.82	0	64	1.14	0	0
Economic Freedom Fighters	47	0.84	0	41	0.73	0	0
Cape Independence Party	16	0.29	0	19	0.34	0	0
Suid - Kaap Saamstaan	10	0.18	0	5	0.09	0	0
Total	5,586	100.00	4	5,616	100.00	3	7
Valid votes	5,586	98.57		5,616	98.44		
Invalid/blank votes	81	1.43		89	1.56		
Total votes	5,667	100.00		5,705	100.00		
Registered voters/turnout	8,073	70.20		8,073	70.67		

=== By-elections from November 2021 ===
The following by-elections were held to fill vacant ward seats in the period from the election in November 2021.

Date	Ward	Party of the previous councillor	Party of the newly elected councillor
14 September 2022	4	Karoo Gemeenskap Party	Democratic Alliance

The by-election took place after the Karoo Gemeenskap Party (KGP), in a coalition with the African National Congress (ANC) and Patriotic Alliance (PA), expelled its ward councillor and mayor Margy Jaftha for supporting the Democratic Alliance (DA) in a motion to replace the speaker and the deputy mayor with DA representatives. Jaftha subsequently stood for the DA against KGP leader Goliat Lottering, winning the seat, and earning the DA an outright majority on the council.

== November 2026 election ==
The following table shows the results of the 2026 election.

Party	Ward			List			Total seats
Party	Votes	%	Seats	Votes	%	Seats	Total seats
Patriotic Alliance	2,996	48.99	4	2,995	48.96	1	5
Democratic Alliance	2,241	36.65	1	2,275	37.19	3	4
African National Congress	407	6.66	0	409	6.69	1	1
ActionSA	156	2.55	0	148	2.42	0	0
Karoo Democratic Force	136	2.22	0	129	2.11	0	0
Freedom Front Plus	119	1.95	0	103	1.68	0	0
People's Movement for Change	30	0.49	0	27	0.44	0	0
Community First Party	13	0.21	0	13	0.21	0	0
Economic Freedom Fighters	11	0.18	0	12	0.20	0	0
Afrika Mayibuye Movement	6	0.10	0	6	0.10	0	0
Total	6,115	100.00	5	6,117	100.00	5	10
Valid votes	6,115	99.06		6,117	99.24		
Invalid/blank votes	58	0.94		47	0.76		
Total votes	6,173	100.00		6,164	100.00		
Registered voters/turnout	8,734	70.68		8,734	70.57		
