= Lord Milner Hotel =

Hotel in Matjiesfontein, South Africa

Coordinates: 33°13′52″S 20°34′56″E

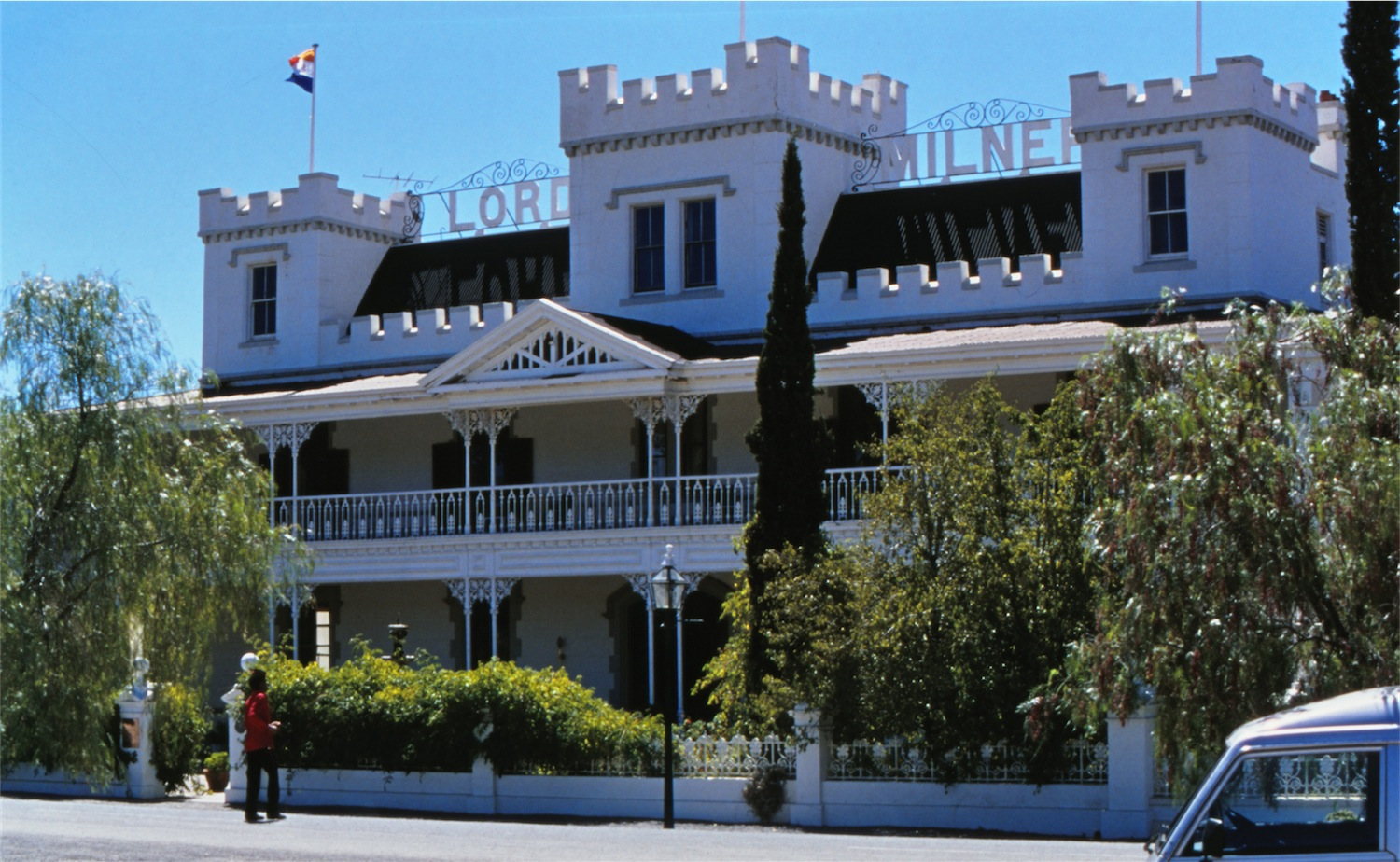
The hotel in 1988.

The Lord Milner Hotel is a historic Victorian landmark located in the railway village of Matjiesfontein, Western Cape, South Africa. The hotel was named for Lord Alfred Milner, who was the governor of the Cape during the Anglo-Boer War. Completed in 1899 by Scottish railway pioneer James Douglas Logan and situated roughly a 2.5 to 3-hour drive from Cape Town, it serves as the architectural heart of a preserved national heritage village.
