= Laingsburg, South Africa =

Laingsburg
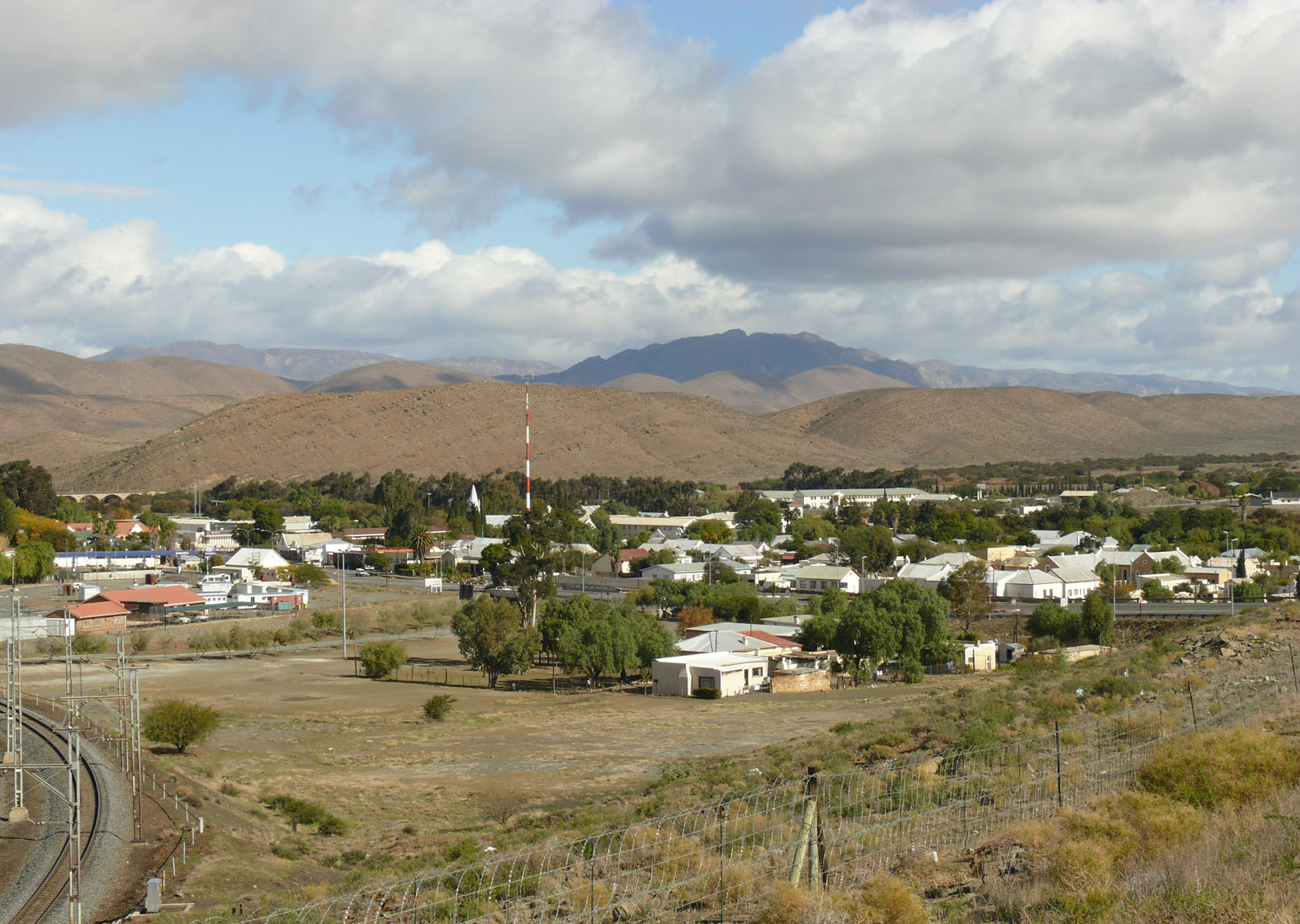
- A view of Laingsburg

- Location within Western Cape Location within South Africa Location within Africa
- Coordinates: 33°11′42″S 20°51′33″E
- Country: South Africa
- Province: Western Cape
- District: Central Karoo
- Municipality: Laingsburg

Area
  - Total: 723.72 km^{2} (279.43 sq mi)

Population (2011)
  - Total: 5,667
  - Density: 7.830/km^{2} (20.28/sq mi)

Racial makeup (2011)
  - Black African: 8.2%
  - Coloured: 82.3%
  - Indian/Asian: 0.3%
  - White: 8.5%
  - Other: 0.7%

First languages (2011)
  - Afrikaans: 93.6%
  - English: 1.7%
  - Xhosa: 1.6%
  - Other: 3.1%
- Time zone: UTC+2 (SAST)
- Postal code (street): 6900
- PO box: 6900
- Area code: 023

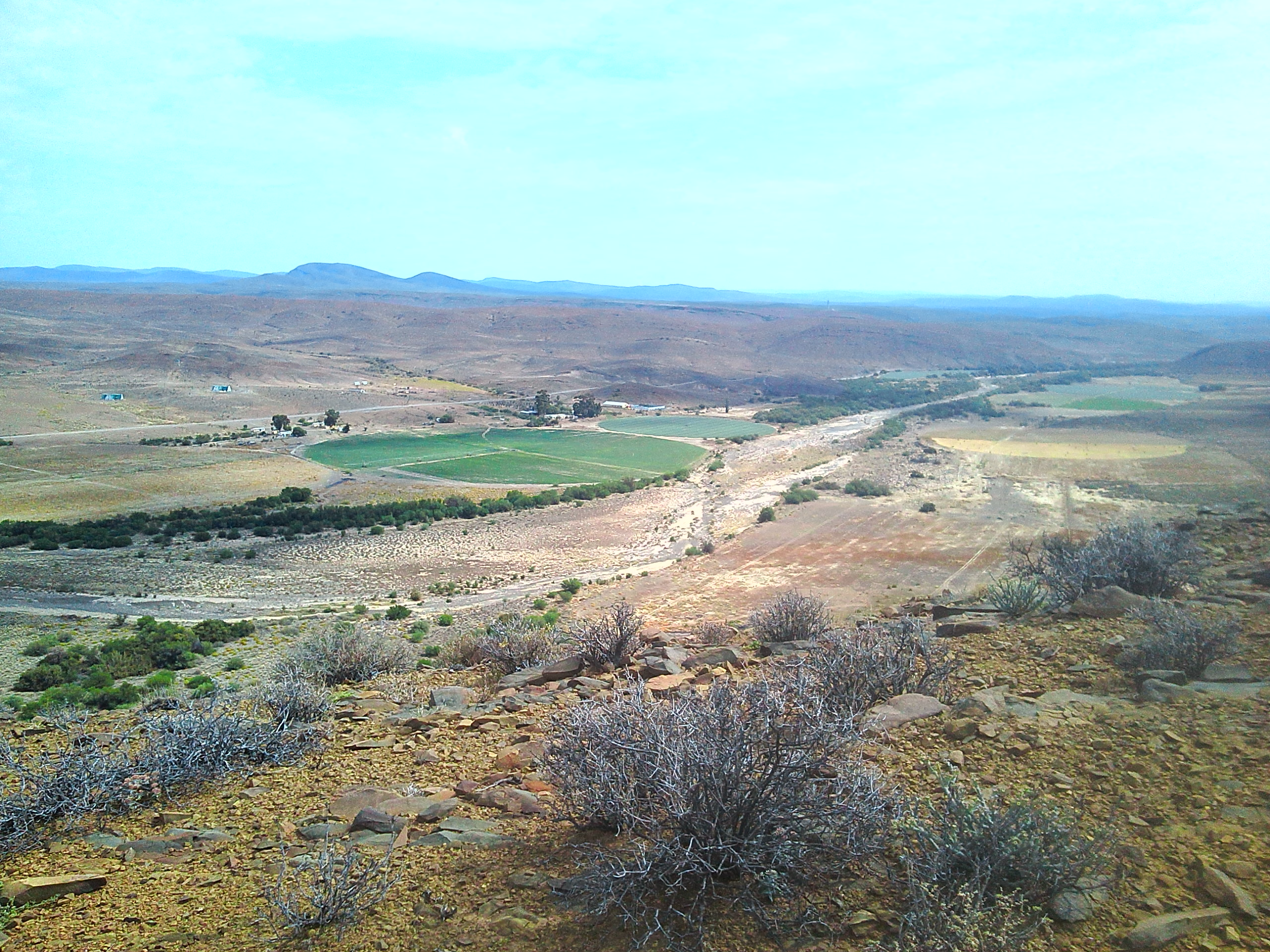

Laingsburg (Afrikaans pronunciation: [ˈlainzbœrχ]) is a town located in the Western Cape province in South Africa. It is a relatively large agricultural town in the semi-arid Great Karoo; its economy is based on farming goats, sheep, fruits, and vegetable. The town is served by two main roads, namely the N1 and the R323.

The area that became Laingsburg was first settled around 1727 or 1728. A train stop was built there in 1878, by which it had been called Buffelsrivier. It was then renamed to "Nassau", and finally to "Laingsburg". In 1904, Laingsburg became a municipality. In 1981, a flash flood, later called the Laingsburg Flood, almost completely submerged the town, destroying much of it.

== History ==
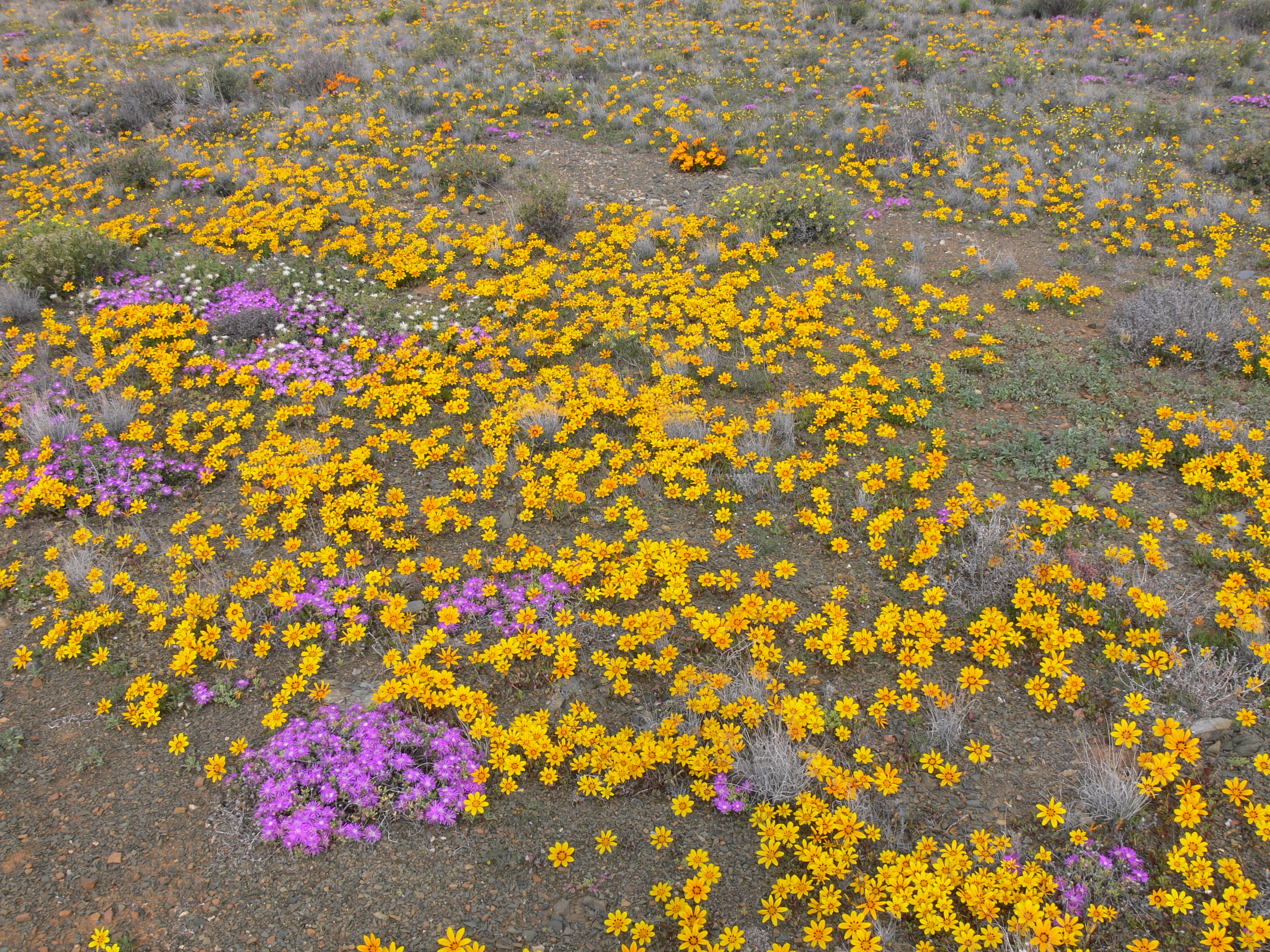

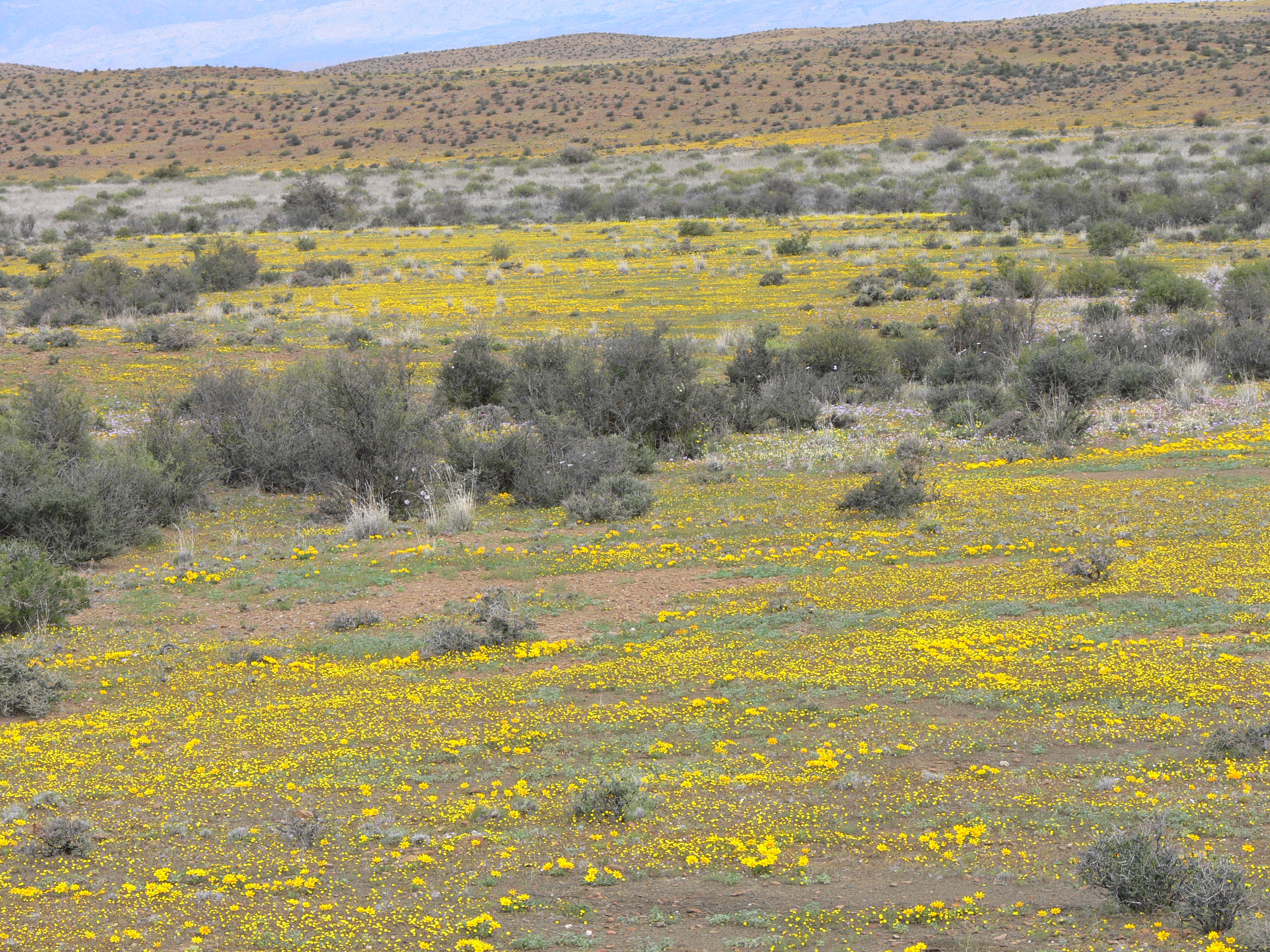
Flowering Karoo near Laingsburg

Following the arrival of the early Dutch, German and Huguenot pioneer settlers in 1727–1728, the area was settled by 18 Trekboer farmer families who trekked up from Riebeek-Kasteel and Swellendam, led by the Meiring, Bezuidenhout, Botha, van Rooyen, van Heerden, Holtzhausen, Eksteen, Du Plooy, Roussouw, Joubert and Viljoen families, who established sheep and orange farms in the area. In 1738 the settlement raised a Commando militia platoon of 20 Riflemen, 5 Mounted Riflemen, 2 field guns and 8 gunners. It was led by Commandant Cornelius Steyn and Field Cornet Petrus Holtzhausen till the 1760s. In the 1760s the Commando organised long range punitive and reconnaissance raids deep into Beaufort West and Nelspoort to recover cattle and sheep. In 1774 the settlement sent an advance commando platoon under the leadership of Veldkornet Bronkhorst of 30 Mounted Riflemen alognwith Mounted Artillerymen carrying two 80 mm field cannons to scout the area around Graaff Reinet where they engaged in a skirmish with 500 native tribes and defeated them. They also briefly clashed with a VOC Commissioned platoon of similar strength led by Field Cornet Arnoldus van der Merwe and Kapitein Gerhardus Swanepoel that trekked up from Oudtshoorn. Eventually 15 families from Laingsburg, amounting to 162 Whites, were among the first pioneer farmers to settle in Graaff Reinet in 1778, including the van der Westhuizen, van Heerden, van Zyl, Bronkhorst, Blignaut, Steyn, Holtzhausen, Reynecke, Eksteen, Engelbrecht, Viljoen, Rousouw and Terre Blanche families.

=== Railway origins ===
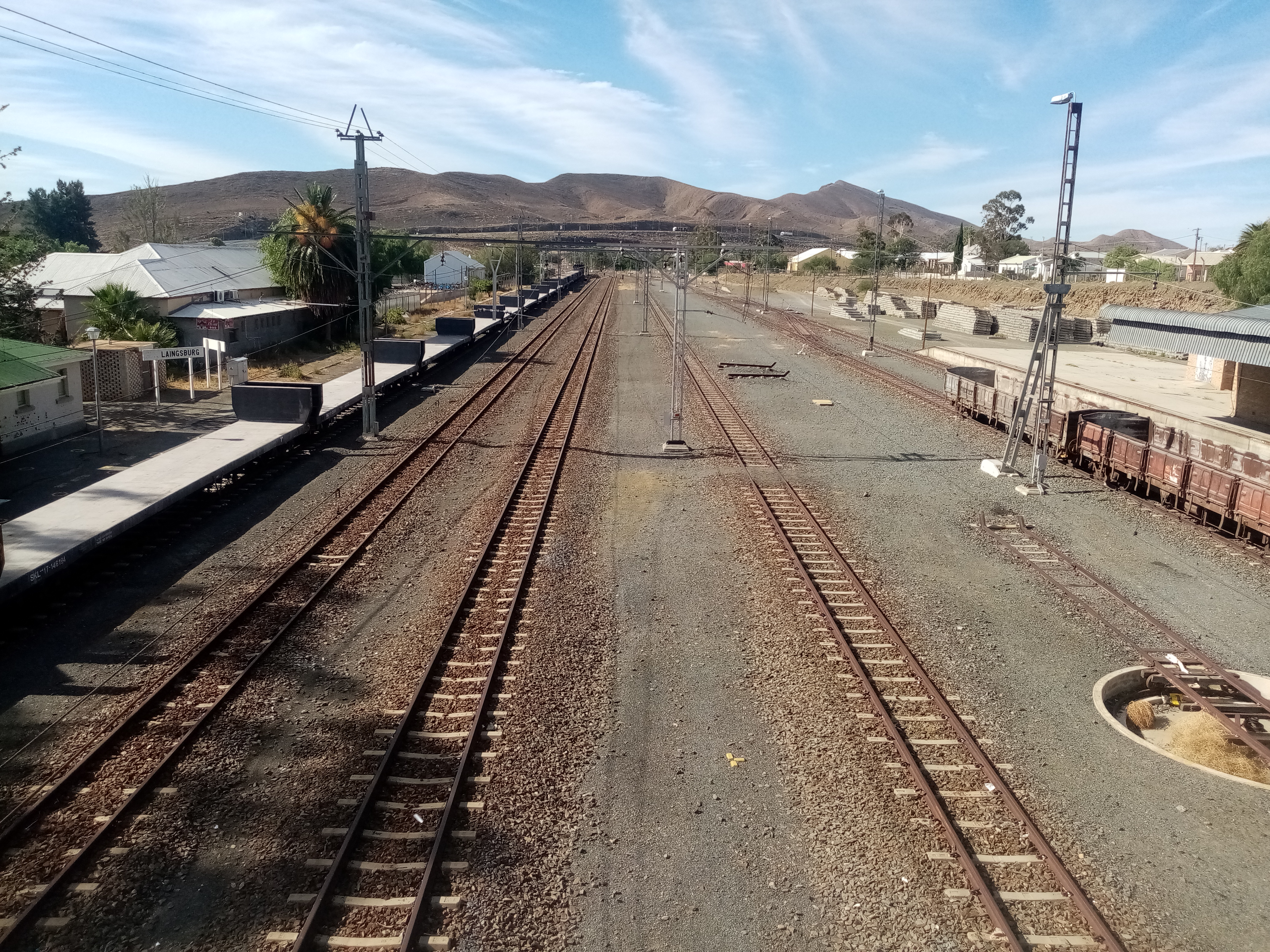

In the 1870s, the government of Prime Minister John Molteno oversaw a massive expansion of the Cape Colony's railway system. The route (chosen by the prime minister with a map, pen and ruler) ran past a farm named Vischkuil-aan-de-Buffelsrivier (fish pond on the Buffalo River) which a man called Stephanus Greeff then bought for the purpose of development.

=== Name changes ===
The line was completed in 1878 and a small siding named Buffelsrivier was built at the farm. With railway access, a town soon began developing. It was soon renamed Nassau to avoid confusion with Buffalo River in East London, and finally changed to the name Laingsburg, after John Laing who was Commissioner of Crown Lands at the time. Originally the town was to be called Laing's Town, but the Afrikaans speaking locals soon started calling it "Links Toon", which means left toe, thus the town was renamed "Laingsburg".

=== Municipality ===
The town was laid out in 1881 and became a municipality in 1904. The Laingsburg Local Municipality has since been expanded to include Bergsig, Goldnerville and Matjiesfontein.

=== 1981 Flash flood ===
On 25 January 1981, in Laingsburg's centennial year, the larger part of the town was swept away within minutes by one of the strongest floods ever experienced in the Great Karoo. After a cloud burst to the north-eastern hinterland, south of the Komsberg, a massive wall of water rushed down the Buffels River and swept away everything it encountered in its way. Animals, humans and their possessions were swept along and later dumped under meters of silt. Hydrologists estimate that a flood in Laingsburg of this magnitude has a recurrence interval of once, on average, every 100 years.

Before the flood, rain initially started with a light drizzle that was welcomed by farmers in the area, since it didn't rain often. But, the soil of the area is of such a nature that it can't absorb much rainwater. The consequence is that water drains directly into the rivers. Water built up in the Baviaans, Wilgerhout and Buffels Rivers and their confluence at the little town. The rivers quickly grew from normally small streams to a roaring wall of water almost 6 m high. Within hours the whole town was under water and residents had to fight for their lives.

During the flood ' The Great Trek Monument', which was erected in Laingsburg in the main street in 1938 to honour the 100 year anniversary of the Great Trek, was washed out. After the flood the biggest part of the monument was recovered but the pedestal of the monument disappeared. In June 2015 Andries Gertse recovered by chance the pedestal along the Buffelsriver at the Railroad Bridge. The monument was re-erected without the original pedestal but with a new one on a hill on the Buffelsriver next to the N1. With the recovery of the original pedestal the history of the Monument is completed. The municipality decided to place the pedestal in the Flood Museum. It is a great reminder of exactly how strong the water was, to be able to break the monument in two, and carry the pieces kilometers down river.

104 people died in the Laingsburg flood, and only 32 bodies were ever recovered. Out of the 184 houses in town, only 21 remained untouched by the water, the others were either completely destroyed, or so badly damaged that they had to be rebuilt.

== Geography ==
Laingsburg is situated along the N1 route, at Lat: -33.20, Long: 20.85, in the Western Cape province of South Africa.

The town is situated in the Great Karoo, a semi-desert region of South-Africa. The town's total rainfall is about 150mm per year. The main water supply is a fountain in the Moordenaars Karoo area. Although the Buffels River runs right through the town, the river hardly ever has any water. Summers are extremely hot and dry, with temperatures usually exceeding 30 °C. Winters are crisp to sometimes very cold, with snow occasionally occurring in the surrounding region. The Seweweekspoort Pass is located along the R323 to the south of the town.

== Economy ==
Laingsburg's economy is mainly based on farming of goats, sheep, lucerne (Alfalfa), fruit and vegetables.

== Climate ==
Climate data for Laingsburg, elevation 656 m (2,152 ft), (1991–2020 normals, extremes 1998–2023)
Month	Jan	Feb	Mar	Apr	May	Jun	Jul	Aug	Sep	Oct	Nov	Dec	Year
Record high °C (°F)	42.8 (109.0)	43.0 (109.4)	40.9 (105.6)	37.9 (100.2)	33.2 (91.8)	29.3 (84.7)	27.8 (82.0)	33.5 (92.3)	36.0 (96.8)	42.0 (107.6)	42.5 (108.5)	41.4 (106.5)	43.0 (109.4)
Mean daily maximum °C (°F)	34.7 (94.5)	34.6 (94.3)	32.2 (90.0)	27.4 (81.3)	23.2 (73.8)	20.0 (68.0)	19.8 (67.6)	21.2 (70.2)	24.1 (75.4)	28.6 (83.5)	30.5 (86.9)	33.1 (91.6)	27.5 (81.4)
Daily mean °C (°F)	26.4 (79.5)	26.4 (79.5)	24.1 (75.4)	19.7 (67.5)	15.5 (59.9)	12.1 (53.8)	11.7 (53.1)	13.1 (55.6)	15.9 (60.6)	20.0 (68.0)	22.2 (72.0)	24.8 (76.6)	19.3 (66.8)
Mean daily minimum °C (°F)	17.9 (64.2)	18.1 (64.6)	16.0 (60.8)	11.9 (53.4)	7.8 (46.0)	4.3 (39.7)	3.6 (38.5)	4.9 (40.8)	7.6 (45.7)	11.5 (52.7)	13.9 (57.0)	16.5 (61.7)	11.2 (52.1)
Record low °C (°F)	8.6 (47.5)	8.9 (48.0)	7.2 (45.0)	2.8 (37.0)	−0.5 (31.1)	−3.3 (26.1)	−3.1 (26.4)	−2.4 (27.7)	0.1 (32.2)	0.5 (32.9)	4.1 (39.4)	7.4 (45.3)	−3.3 (26.1)
Average precipitation mm (inches)	6.5 (0.26)	9.4 (0.37)	15.2 (0.60)	15.4 (0.61)	10.0 (0.39)	9.4 (0.37)	7.9 (0.31)	7.4 (0.29)	6.2 (0.24)	9.1 (0.36)	9.8 (0.39)	9.8 (0.39)	116.1 (4.58)
Average precipitation days (≥ 0.25 mm)	0.8	1.3	2.0	2.0	2.0	2.4	1.6	1.8	1.2	1.4	1.4	1.2	19.1
Source: Starlings Roost Weather (precipitation 1901–2005)
