= Laingsburg Flood =

Deadly 1981 flood in South Africa

The 1981 Laingsburg Flood was a flood that occurred on 25 January 1981 in the town of Laingsburg, Western Cape, South Africa. The flood killed at least 104 residents, and the bodies of 72 people were never found. A total of 184 houses were destroyed.

== Flood Waters ==
The town of Laingsburg is located near where the Buffels River converges with two of its tributaries: the Wilgehout and Baviaans (also known as Bobbejaans) rivers. The Buffels River catchment is usually dry, due to its location in the rain shadow of the Langeberg, Swartberg and Witteberg mountains. However, occasionally, a high-pressure system offshore of the Western Cape can push moist air from the coast over the mountains, resulting in increased rainfall in the Buffels River catchment, in turn leading to increased water flow in the three rivers that converge near Laingsburg. On 24 and 25 January 1981, a synoptic-scale weather event developed over the south-western parts of South Africa, causing heavy rainfall in the region.

On January 25, 1981, unprecedented rainfall in the Buffels catchment area caused the Buffels River to overflow its banks. The water level started to rise in town at about 12:00, and by 14:00, the town was almost fully covered. Flood waters and mud swept through Laingsburg, with some areas experiencing water levels reaching 10 metres above the usual flow level.

The river current, at its peak, was estimated to be 8000 cubic metres per second.

Timeline of Rising Waters (January 25, 1981):

- 10:00 AM: Water began flowing down Krige Street.
- 12:00 PM: The flood entered the old age home.
- 1:00 PM – 4:00 PM: Water levels rose steadily, reaching 5 meters deep at the school hostel.
- 5:45 PM: The flood peaked, leaving only "islands" visible in the Main (Voortrekker) Street.

== Damage ==
The flood destroyed two-thirds of Laingsburg's infrastructure, destroying 184 houses and 23 commercial buildings, including the town's old-age home. The flood killed 104 people, with 72 bodies never recovered.

A report published in January 1982 identified the geographical position of Laingsburg as making it particularly vulnerable to large floods. Laingsburg is situated on a natural flood plain on the inside bend of the Buffels River.

Another geographical factor contributing to the damage was the confluence of the Buffels, Wilgehout, and Baviaans rivers, and the east-west ridge directly downstream (south) of the confluence. The two large tributaries and the Buffels River converge immediately upstream of the poort (passage between mountains) through the ridge, and the ridge directed the flow in the tributaries northward into the southern part of town. The combined effects of all three rivers and the constriction of river by the poort accounted for much of the damage in the southern part of Laingsburg between Swartberg St and the river.

The deposition of sediment is a widespread form of flood damage in the drier regions of South Africa. Rivers in the Cape Midlands and the Karoo carry high sediment loads in high floods. The sediment-carrying capacity of flowing water depends on the velocity of the water. When the river overflows its banks, the velocity decreases as the water flows away from the river bed, particularly where it flows through a built-up area. The slower-moving water can no longer carry the sediment loads associated with the mid-stream velocities, and the sediment is deposited as the water slows down. Heavy sediment deposits result, especially in the vicinity of houses nearest to the enlarged river channel, where the flowing water's velocity is rapidly decreasing. Sediment deposits in Laingsburg were up to 3 m deep in many places and the total sediment volume deposited was about 200 000 cubic meters.

Another factor that caused much damage in Laingsburg was the large amount of floating debris. This consisted mainly of trees washed down the river from upstream, but it also included debris from buildings in the town itself. The debris caused physical damage to the buildings and aggravated sediment deposition.

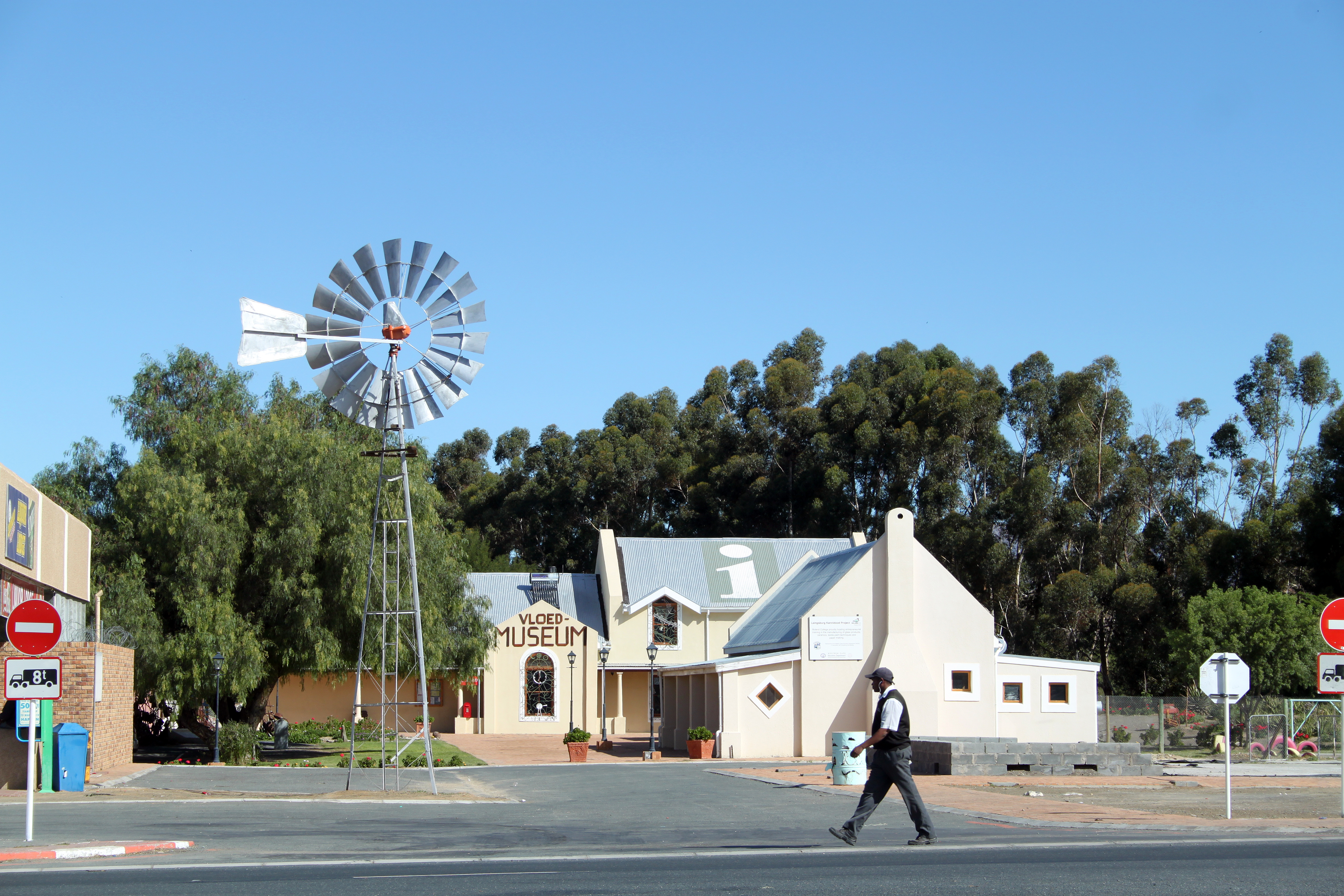
Laingsburg Flood Museum off the main street

Many buildings in Laingsburg collapsed due to high water levels alone. Those that collapsed were mainly the older buildings. Newer, more soundly constructed buildings were not seriously damaged except those subjected to high scouring velocities.

The Old Age Home saw the most significant loss of life. While some elderly residents were saved by a truck, many others were moved into the ceiling or onto the roof to escape rising water. When the building eventually collapsed, 28 people drowned, including the local Reverend and staff members.

Residents sought refuge in trees and on rooftops, often having to fend off live electrical wires and floating debris. One survivor, Jozef le Roes, was swept 15 kilometers downstream and survived, though his companions did not. Others were washed 20 kilometers into the Floriskraal Dam, where they were eventually rescued by helicopters.

== First Reports ==
The first flood reports emerged after SADF Super Frelon helicopters flew over the town at 09:00 on Monday morning the 26th of January 1981.

== Aftermath ==
The South African Defence Force (SADF) used 14 helicopters for search and rescue operations. Once rescue missions ended on January 28, they shifted to recovery, using excavators to clear massive amounts of silt from public buildings. A "tent town" of 115 tents was established on the rugby field to house the homeless. To prevent disease from contaminated water, a purification system was set up, and mobile kitchens provided daily meals.

The disaster triggered an immense public response, with tons of food, clothing, and money donated from across South Africa and abroad. Excess donated goods were eventually auctioned to fund the rebuilding phase.

== Long-Term Effects ==
The South African government spent millions—including R2.3 million for payouts and R7 million for new houses—but the process was contentious. Residents were dissatisfied that new houses were built on a rocky expanse without consultation, which made gardening and construction difficult. The rebuilding highlighted racial disparities. Narrative accounts suggest that while white cemeteries were restored, a "colored" cemetery destroyed by the flood was left in ruins, leading to long-standing resentment. Some newer homes and schools were allegedly built over these original grave sites.

The "invisible" damage included long-term trauma; many survivors remained reluctant to discuss the event decades later. For many, the sound of heavy rain still triggers memories of the disaster.
