= Karoo Gemeenskap Party =

Political party in South Africa

The Karoo Gemeenskap Party (Afrikaans: Gemeenskap meaning "community") was formed in 2010 and is a small South African regional political party, active in parts of the Karoo.

In the 2011 municipal election, the KGP contested and won three out of seven seats in the council of the Prince Albert Local Municipality, while the African National Congress (ANC) and Democratic Alliance (DA) each won two. It also held one seat on the council of the Central Karoo District Municipality, in which the ANC and the DA each held six. In both councils the KGP entered into a coalition with the ANC to control the municipality.

In the 2016 municipal election, the KGP won two out of seven seats in the council of the Prince Albert Local Municipality, while the DA won three and the ANC two. It also held two seats on the council of the Central Karoo District Municipality. In both councils the KGP entered into a coalition with the DA.

In the 2021 municipal election, the KGP again won two out of seven seats, entering into a coalition with the ANC in the aftermath. In a by-election in September 2022, the KGP lost one of its wards to the DA, resulting in a clear majority for the DA in the council.
