= Dutch Reformed Church, Murraysburg =

Church in Murraysburg, South Africa

Dutch Reformed Church
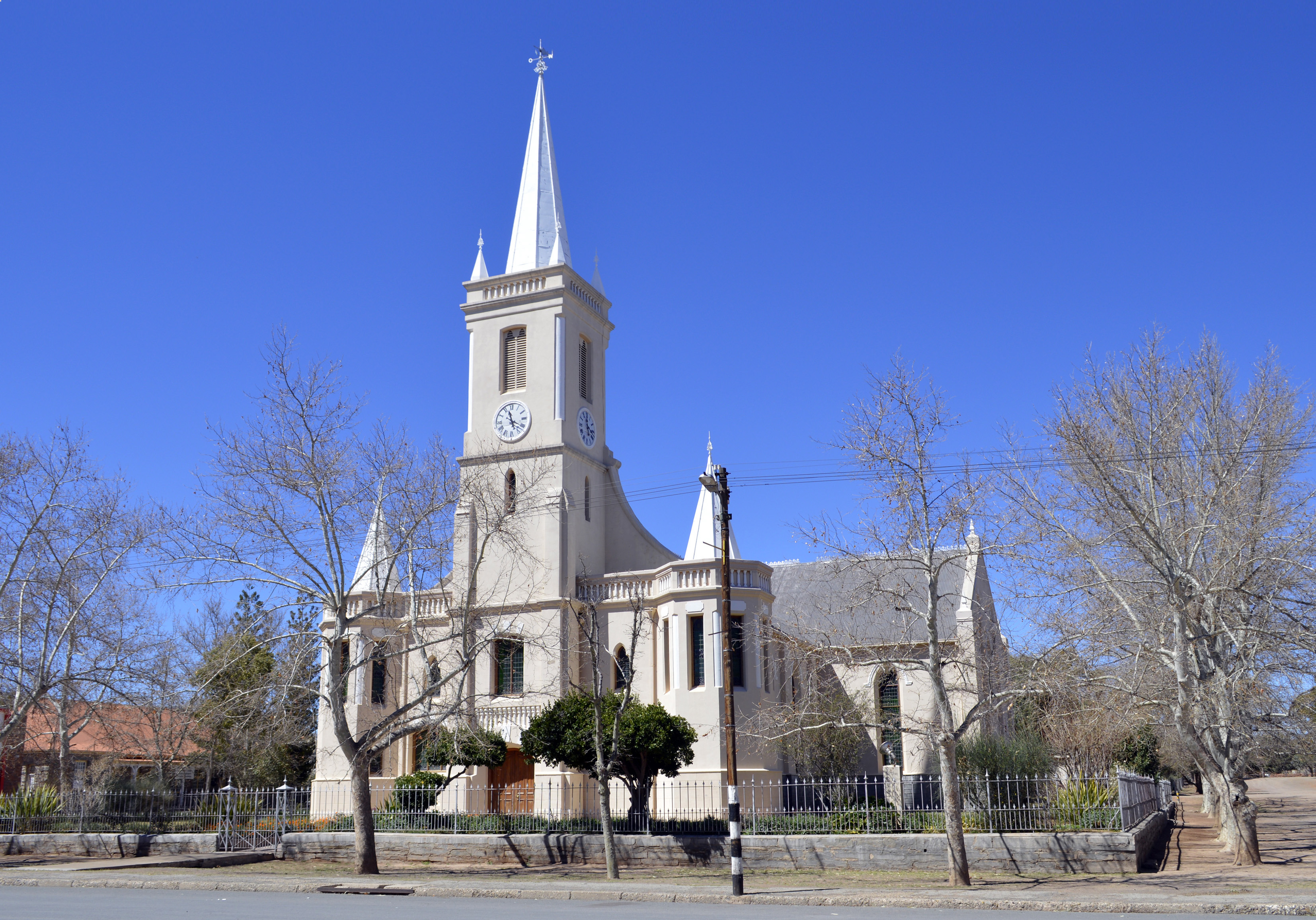
- Location: Murraysburg
- Country: South Africa
- Denomination: Nederduits Gereformeerde Kerk

History
- Founded: 1855

Architecture
- Functional status: Church

The Dutch Reformed Church in Murraysburg is a congregation of the Dutch Reformed Church in the Eastern Cape Synod, although the town of Murraysburg has been within the Western Cape province since 1994.

== Background ==
The town and congregation of Murraysburg, as was the case with the NG congregation of Richmond, originated due to the need of NG members in the field cornetship Uitvlucht from the vast district of Graaff-Reinet for a place of worship. The historic meeting of the Presbyterian Commission under the chairmanship of Rev. Andrew Murray Sr., the father of the well-known Dr. Andrew Murray, on the farm Eenzaamheid on 19 April 1855 can be regarded as the founding meeting of the congregation. At the time, it was the 64th congregation of the NG Church and today Murraysburg is the 14th oldest NG congregation in the Eastern Cape Synod. If the initial negotiations had been successful, Murraysburg would have been built on the farm Toorfontein, 10 miles (about 16 km) west of the present town.

== Ministers ==
- J.H. Hofmeyr, 1859–1867
- A.A. Louw, 1867–1882
- Johannes Hendrik van Wijk, 1884–1898 (emeritus; died 16 September 1920)
- Stefanus Jacobus Perold, 1898–1904
- Roelof Daniel MacDonald, 1905–1911
- Charles Murray Hofmeyr, 1912–1924, a son of the first minister
- George David du Toit, 1925–1937, after which until his retirement in 1948 special evangelist of the Cape Church
- Dr. W.A. Landman, 1937–1940
- Zacharias Blomerus Loots, 1941–1943
- Johannes Lodewyk Nel, 1944–1948
- Albertus Meyer Robertson, 1949–1954
- Daniël Brink, 1954–1958
- S.S. van Huyssteen, 1959–1962
- W.J. Smit, 1963–1968
- Abraham Jacobus Beukes, 1969 – 10 December 1972 (emeritus)
- J.H. Siebert, 1974–1985
- Schalk du Toit, 1985–2008 (emeritus)
- Nadine Jacobs, 22 April 2018 – 2020
- Luané McLachlan, 8 November 2020 – present

== Sources ==
- Dreyer, eerw. A. 1935.Gedenkboek van die Nederduits-Gereformeerde Kerk Somerset Oos. Kaapstad: Cape Times Beperk.
- Olivier, ds. P.L. (samesteller), Ons gemeentelike feesalbum. Kaapstad en Pretoria: N.G. Kerk-uitgewers, 1952.
- (in Afrikaans) Hofmeyr, W. Lou(w); Hofmeyr, Nico J.; Hofmeyr, S.M.; Hofmeyr, George S.; Hofmeyr, Johannes W. (samestellers). 1987. Die Hofmeyrs: 'n Familiegeskiedenis. Lynnwoodrif en Bloemfontein: Die Samestellers.
