= Nelspoort =

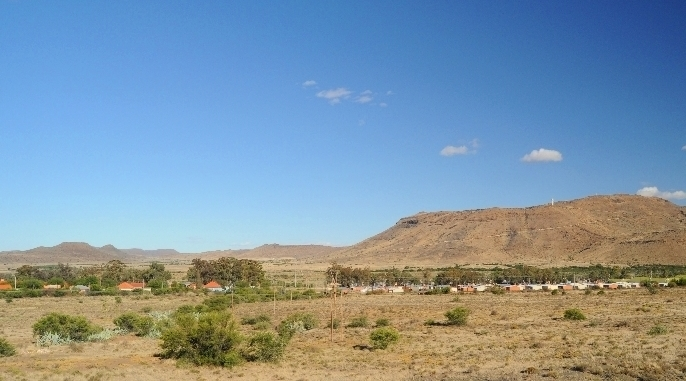
- Part of the town of Nelspoort in the Karoo

- Location within Western Cape Location within South Africa
- Coordinates: 32°7′S 23°0′E
- Country: South Africa
- Province: Western Cape
- District: Central Karoo
- Municipality: Beaufort West

Area
  - Total: 72.04 km^{2} (27.81 sq mi)

Population (2011)
  - Total: 1,699
  - Density: 23.58/km^{2} (61.08/sq mi)

Racial makeup (2011)
  - Black African: 17.0%
  - Coloured: 80.9%
  - Indian/Asian: 0.8%
  - White: 0.9%
  - Other: 0.4%

First languages (2011)
  - Afrikaans: 90.5%
  - Xhosa: 2.7%
  - English: 2.1%
  - Sotho: 2.1%
  - Other: 2.7%
- Time zone: UTC+2 (SAST)
- Postal code (street): 6973
- PO box: 6973
- Area code: 023

Nelspoort is a town located in Beaufort West Local Municipality in the Western Cape, South Africa.

The town of Nelspoort lies at the foot of the Nuweveld Mountains, 50 kilometres north-east of Beaufort West on an old section of the N1 highway. It is nearby to a watercourse, the Salt River, which flows after rains, from the Nuweveld mountains to a seasonal wetland to the south.

== History ==
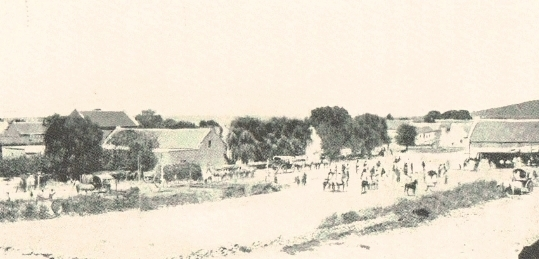
Riders and wagons outspanning in Nelspoort, 1868.

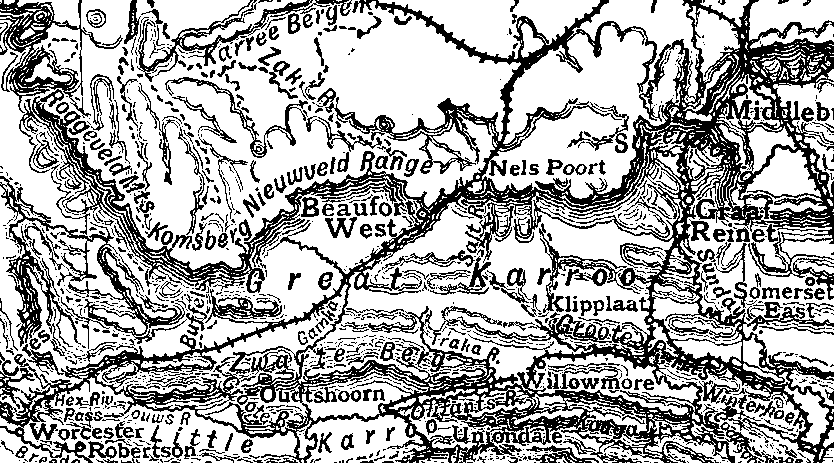
Nelspoort relative to Beaufort West in the Great Karoo. Map from 1911.

The original inhabitants of the area were the indigenous San, whose rock paintings and engravings still adorn the stones in the hills around Nelspoort, especially on the rock faces of Tierkloof. Among the animals depicted in these paintings is a possible Megalotragus, a large animal of a long extinct bovine genus. This suggests that some of the paintings might be at least 10,000 years old.

In the 1700s, waves of semi-nomadic farmers arrived from the Cape. These were the "Trekboers" and the "Griquas", Afrikaans-speaking migrants who inhabited the borderlands of the Cape Colony. In the ensuing century, the area was sporadically farmed, but much of the sparse population remained semi-nomadic.

The actual town of Nelspoort had its origins nearly a century later in 1843, when a young Anglo-Italian immigrant, John Molteno, arrived and established a farming business by that name. Over the next few years he built it into an enormous network of sheep farming estates, and eventually became the first Prime Minister of the Cape Colony. Geared towards wool exports, much of the region continued to be farmed by his successors and the Nelspoort farm itself became the nucleus for the growing town.

During the Anglo-Boer War, the British built hundreds of blockhouses in the area to protect their prime railway link, and in 1920 a Sanatorium was opened nearby for patients with Tuberculosis and other pulmonary illnesses. This institution was located here to take advantage of the dry, clean, fresh air of the Karoo mountains, and provided employment for many local villagers. It was a huge success that produced excellent results, with visitors including even the likes of the British royal family. By the 1970s though, tuberculosis was in decline and the sanatorium eventually closed.

Recently, a change in the route of both the N1 highway (the largest road in the country) and the Cape's main Railway line, have meant that the town has been deprived of a large percentage of its income and has consequently shrunk.

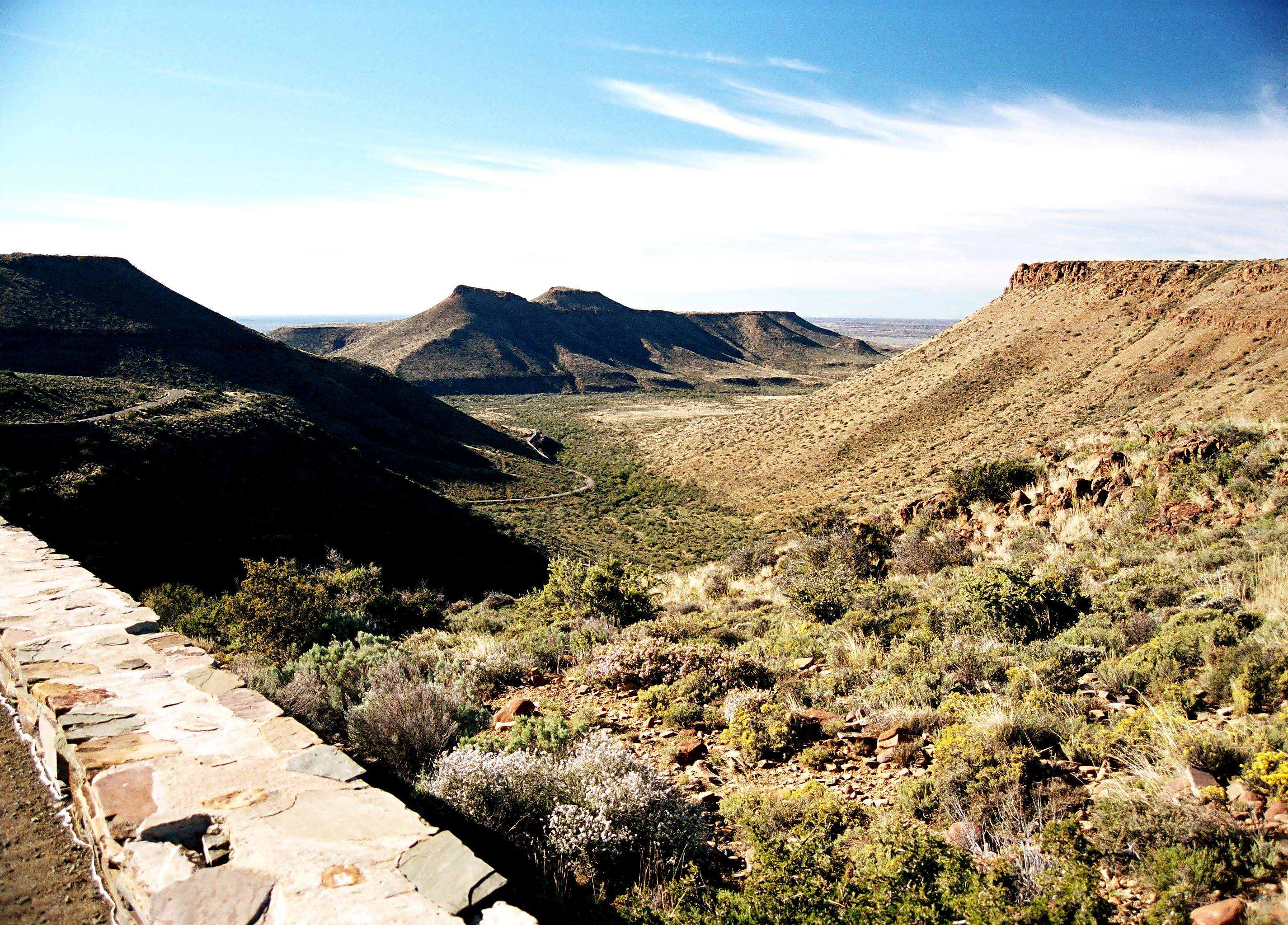
The Nuweveld Mountains in the vicinity of Nelspoort.
