= Valley of Desolation (South Africa) =

Rocky defile in Camdeboo National Park, Eastern Cape, South Africa

Coordinates: 32°15′58″S 24°29′23″E

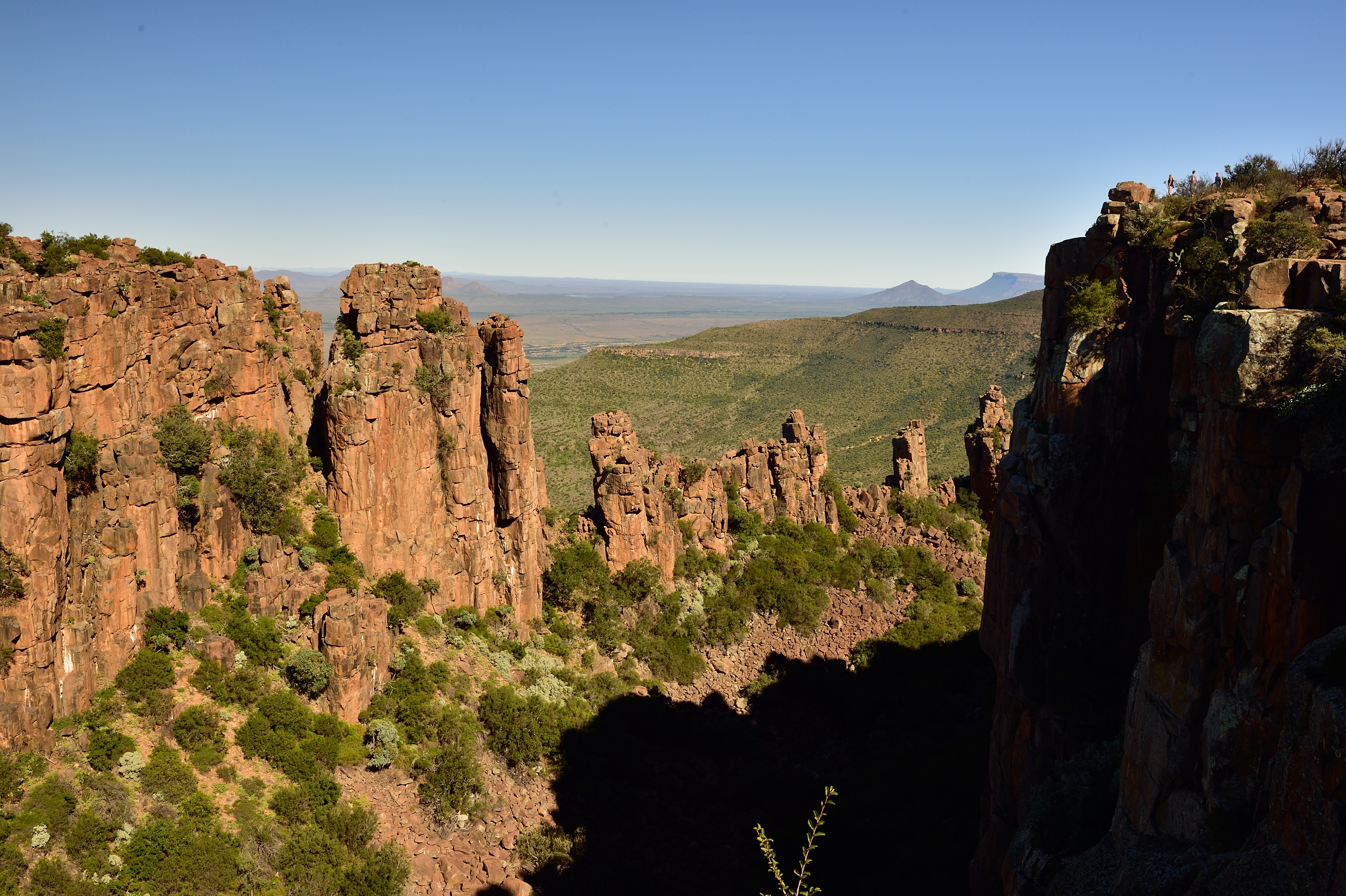

The Valley of Desolation is a rocky defile in South Africa. It is a natural monument of special geological significance. This attraction is located 14 km from Graaff-Reinet on the R63 main road to Murraysburg.

Perpendicular cliffs and high dolerite pillars against the backdrop of the plains of the Kamdeboo are the result of volcanic activity and erosion 150 to 190 million years ago.

This special piece of mountain terrain was declared a national monument in 1935. Pierneef immortalized it in one of his paintings.
