= District Management Area =

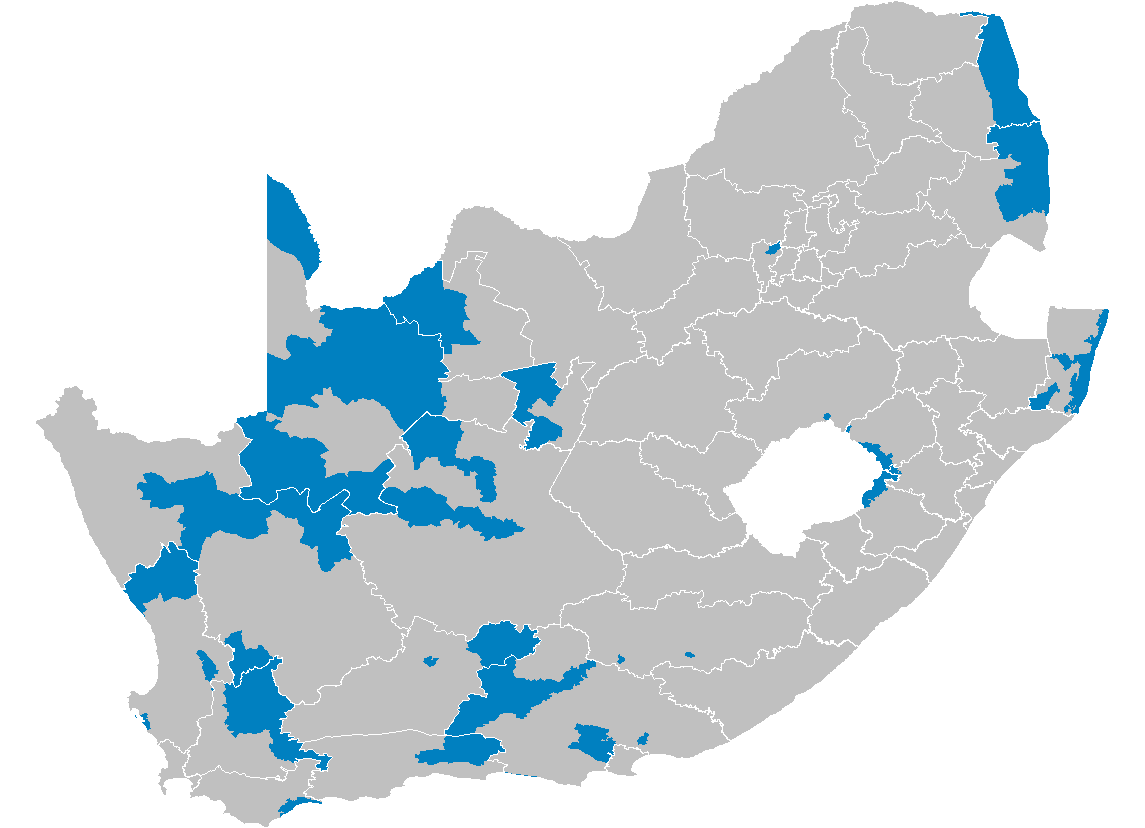
A map of South African districts showing the District Management Areas before 2011

In South Africa, District Management Area (DMA) was the name given to areas within a district municipality that did not fall within any local municipality, and received municipal services directly from the district. Since the 2011 elections all of mainland South Africa has been covered by local (or metropolitan) municipalities, and there are therefore no DMAs.

The DMAs were primarily national parks and nature reserves, or in western parts of South Africa are isolated areas of very low population density.

The table shows the 2007 census population of the DMAs.

Code	Name	Population 2007
ECDMA10	Cacadu	5285
ECDMA13	Chris Hani	89
FSDMA19	Thabo Mofutsanyane	171
GTDMA48	West Rand	2918
KZDMA22	Umgungundlovu	12
KZDMA23	Uthukela	512
KZDMA27	Umkhanyakude	10958
KZDMA43	Sisonke	814
LIMDMA33	Mopani	999
MPDMA32	Ehlanzeni	2948
NCDMA06	Namakwa	897
NCDMA07	Pixley ka Seme	2116
NCDMA08	Siyanda	4882
NCDMA09	Frances Baard	2588
NCDMA45	Kgalagadi	5597
WCDMA01	West Coast	7199
WCDMA02	Cape Winelands	5260
WCDMA03	Overberg	244
WCDMA04	Eden	11479
WCDMA05	Central Karoo	5609

== See also ==
- Metropolitan municipality (South Africa)
- District municipality (South Africa)
- Local municipality (South Africa)
