= Great Karoo =

Region in the Western, Northern and Eastern Cape provinces of South Africa

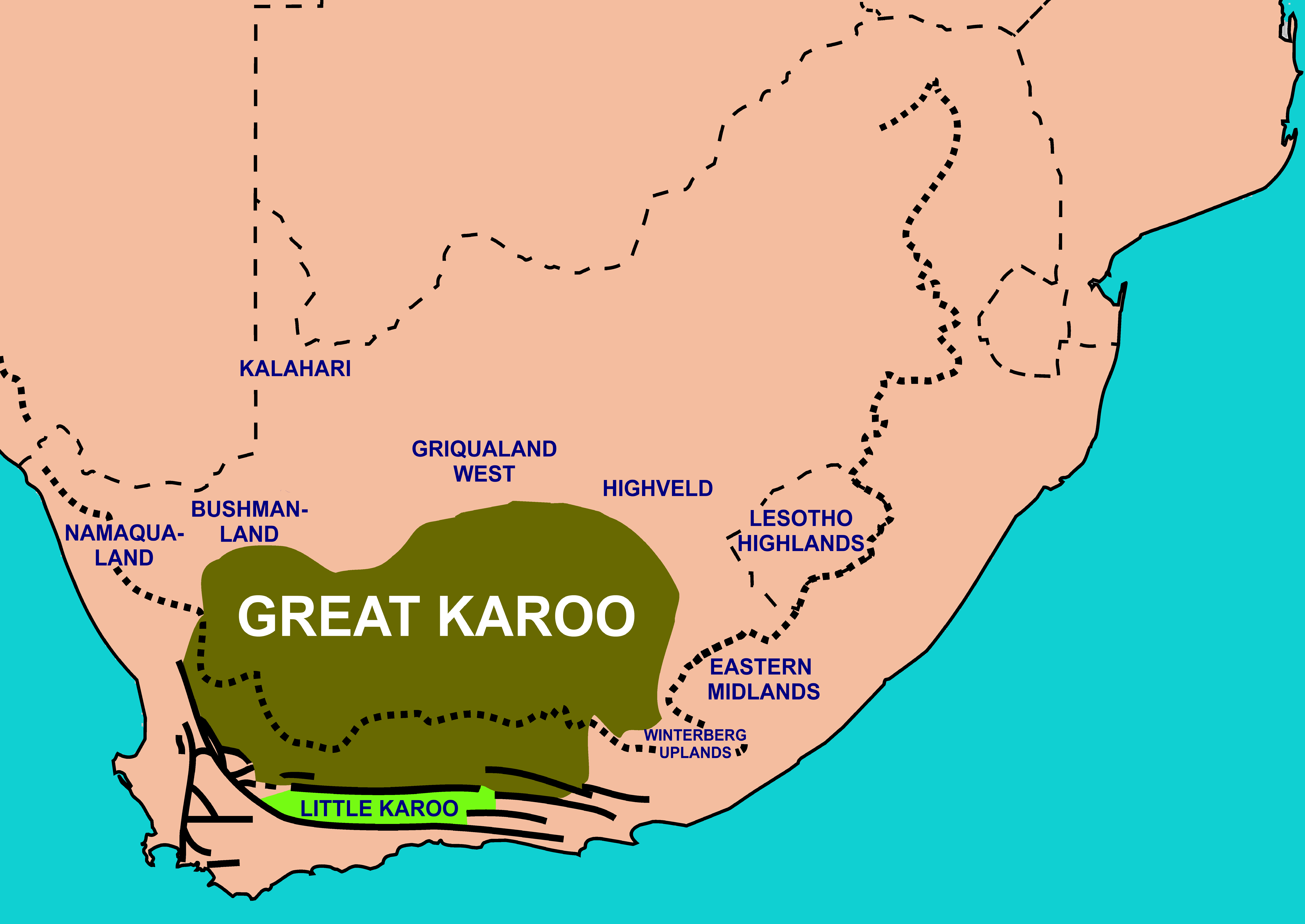

The Great Karoo is a large semi-desert and plateau basin in South Africa, located between the Great Escarpment and the Swartberg Mountains. It is approximately 400,000 km^{2} (150,000 sq mi) and is one of the components of the Karoo, the other being the Klein Karoo or "Little Karoo." It stretches across the Western Cape, Northern Cape, and Eastern Cape provinces and is known for its diverse, mostly untouched landscapes, unique geological formations like the Valley of Desolation, ancient rock art, and being a significant area for Merino sheep and Angora goat farming.

The region receives very little rainfall, about 100–400 mm annually, making it predominantly arid.

It is characterized by sparse, drought-resistant vegetation, including hardy shrubs and low-growing plants adapted to arid conditions, and it provides habitat for a diverse range of wildlife such as antelopes, foxes, meerkats, and over 200 species of birds.
