= Anysberg Nature Reserve =

Nature reserve in the Western Cape, South Africa

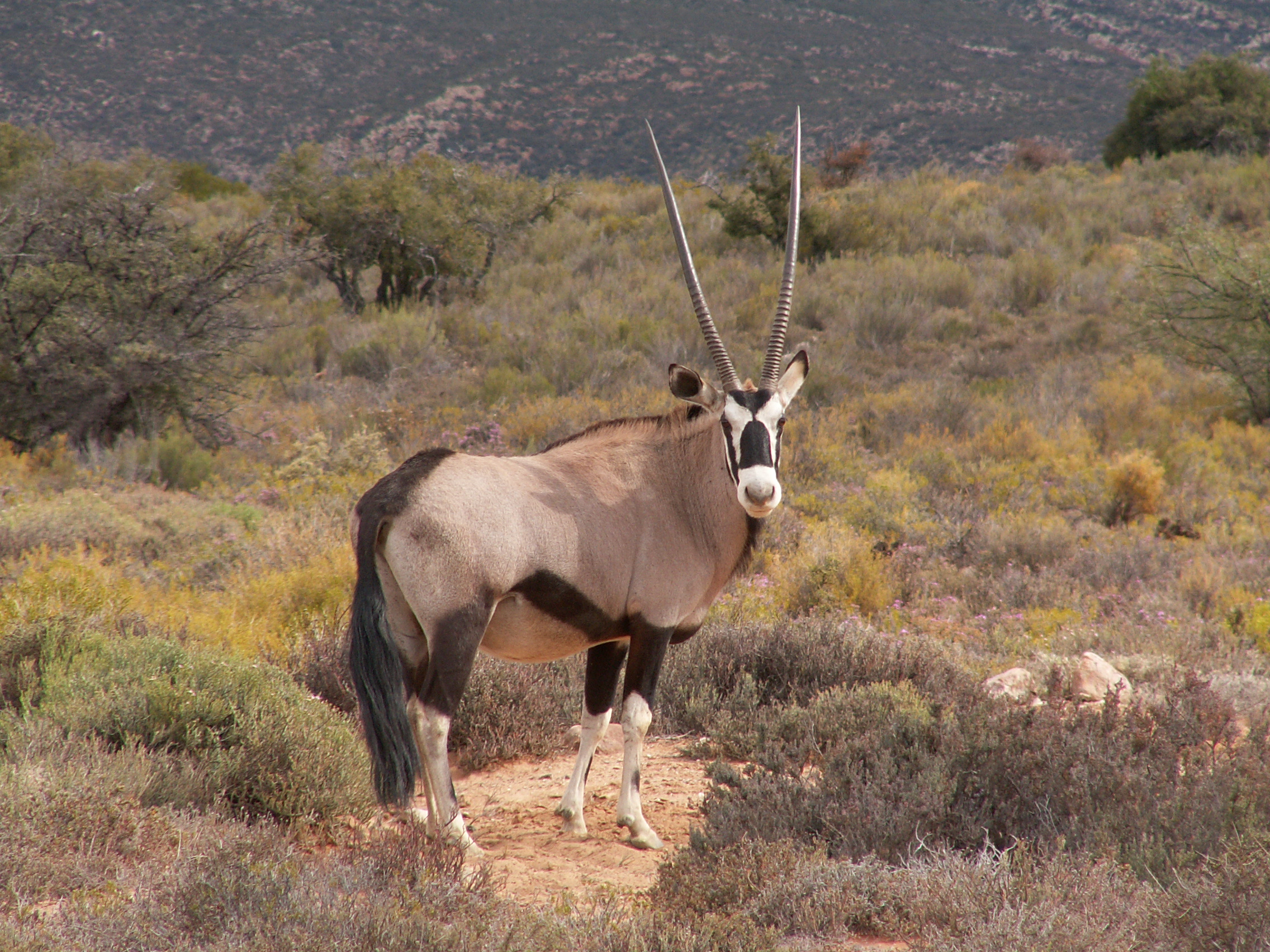
- Gemsbok Oryx gazella, Anysberg Nature Reserve
- Interactive map of Anysberg Nature Reserve
- Type: Nature reserve
- Location: Western Cape, South Africa
- Nearest city: Laingsburg
- Coordinates: 33°31′S 20°37′E
- Area: 796.29 km^{2} (307.45 sq mi)
- Established: 25 May 1984
- Administrator: CapeNature
- Website: Anysberg Nature Reserve – Capenature

The Anysberg Nature Reserve is a 62,500 ha (154,000-acre; 625 km^{2}; 241 sq mi) nature preserve situated in the western Little Karoo region of the Gouritz Cluster Biosphere Reserve in the Western Cape province, South Africa. The central mountain is named after Anise, Pimpinella anisum, which is found in the reserve. The reserve was established in 1984, to conserve succulent and fynbos flora in the Cape Fold Belt, and to reintroduce game which formerly occurred here.

The nearest towns are Laingsburg and Ladismith, which are both about 55 km (34 mi) from the main reserve entrance.

== History ==
Land for the reserve was first set aside in 1984 below the Anysberg Mountain Catchment Area (designated in 1978). This was further extended multiple times to its current area of 79,629 ha (196,770 acres; 796.29 km^{2}; 307.45 sq mi).

== Biodiversity ==
Fed by three rivers, the diversity of life is supported here amidst mountain feathers and the characteristic Klein Karoo veil.

About 180 species of birds are regularly spotted in the reserve, making it a popular choice for bird watchers. In addition to the enchanting landscape and rich plant and animal life, the reserve is also home to San rock art, painted thousands of years ago.

== Gallery ==
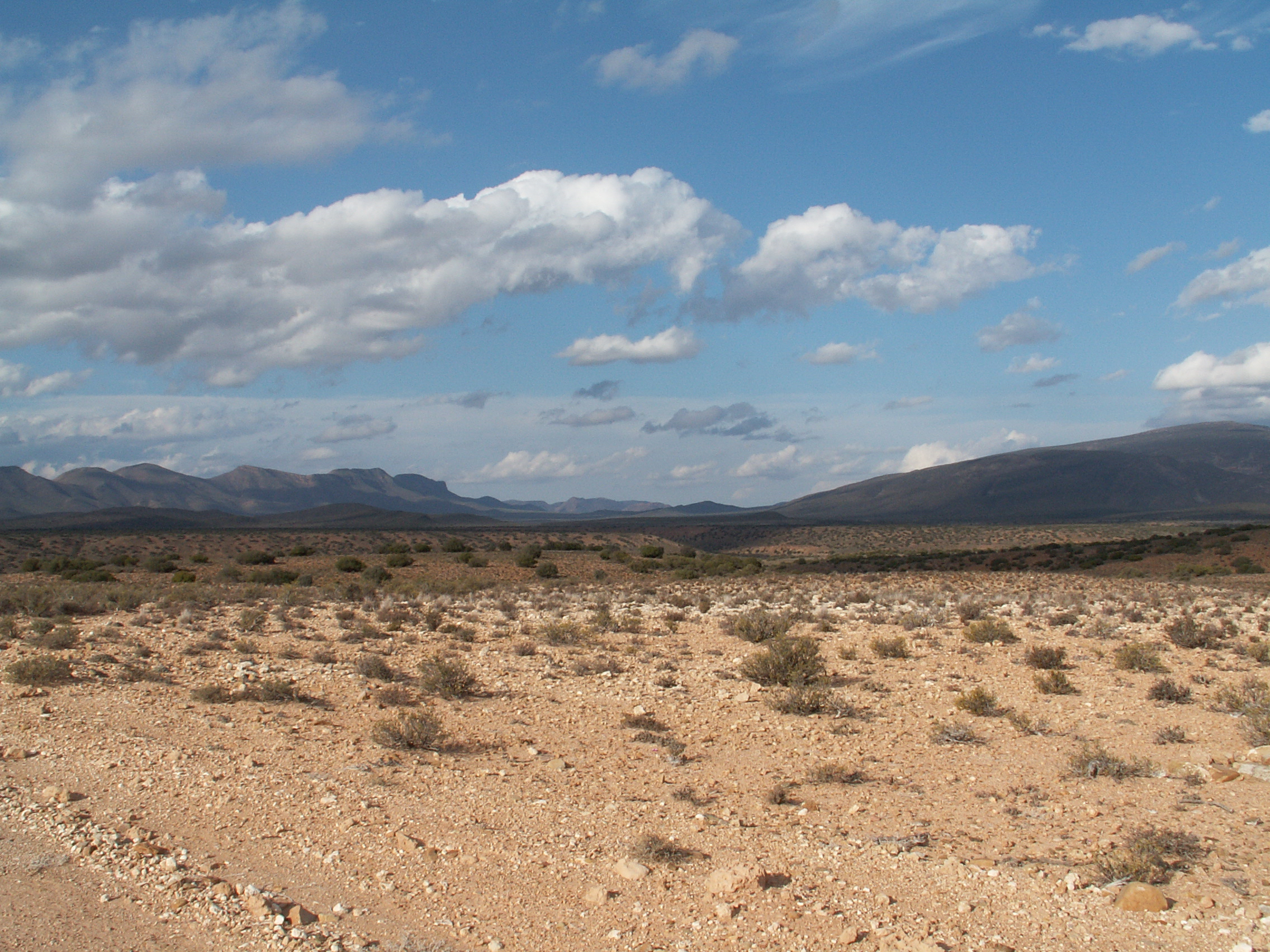
Landscape, Anysberg Nature Reserve

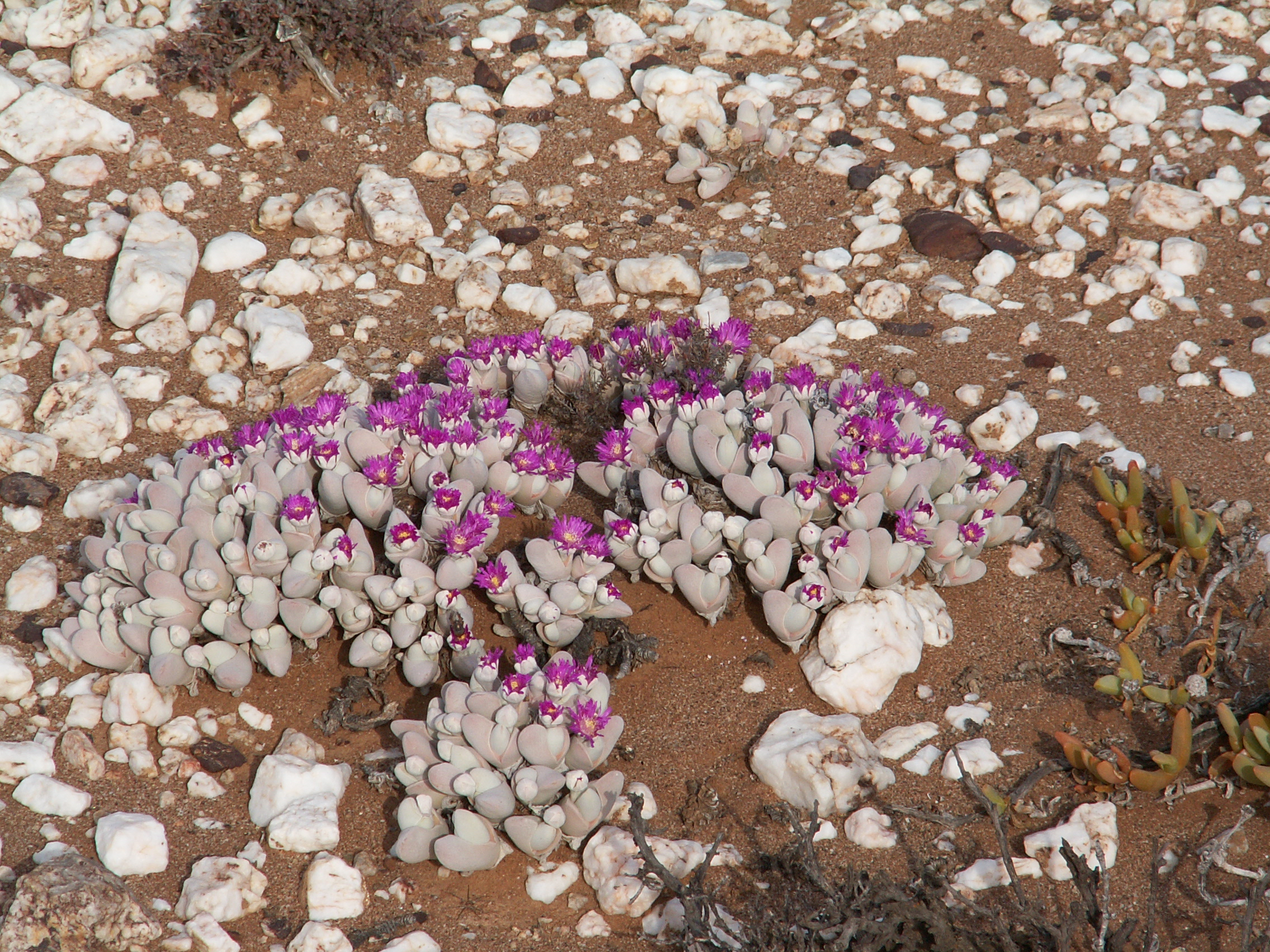
Succulents Gibbaeum pubescens, Anysberg Nature Reserve

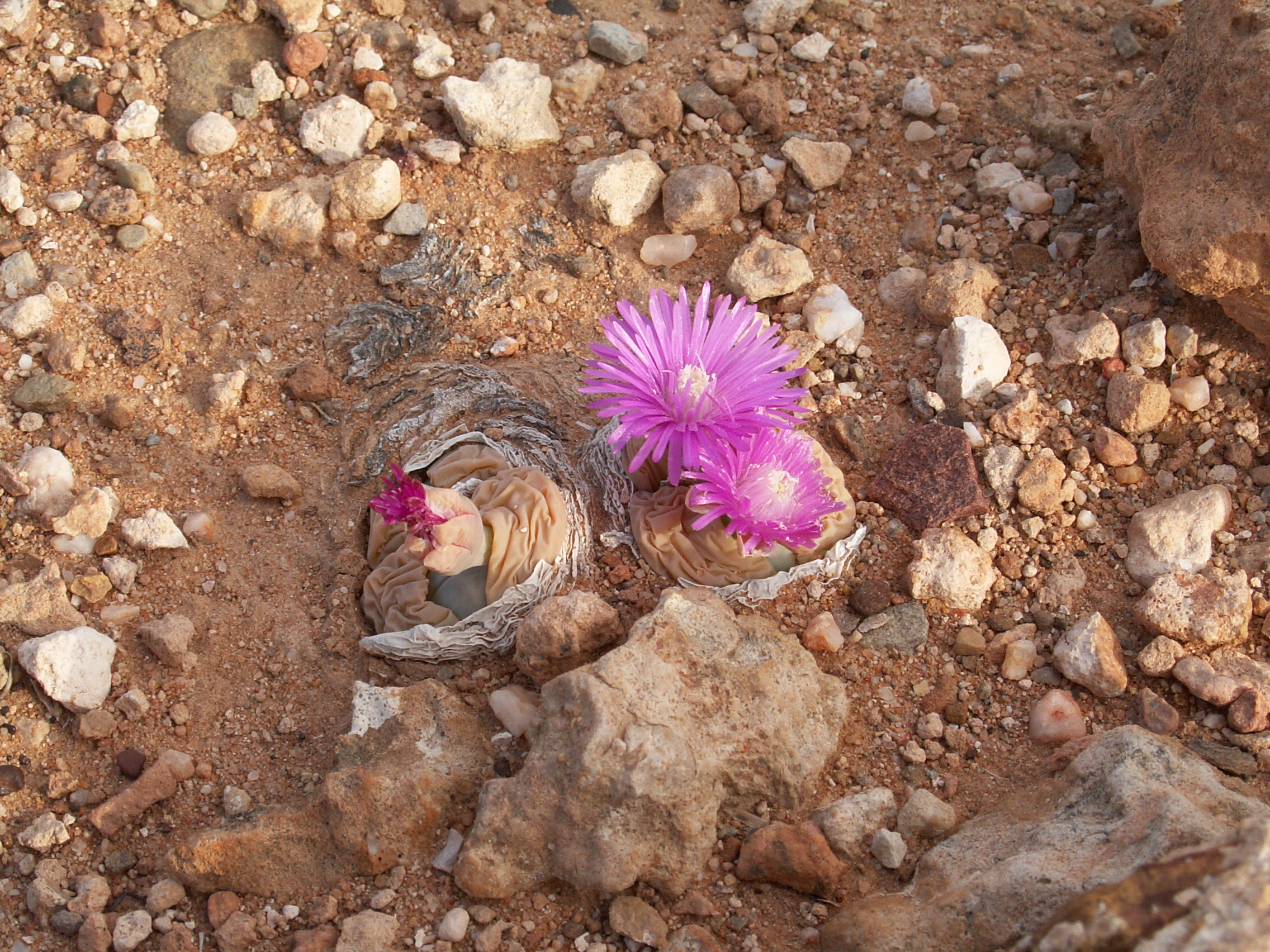
Succulents (Aizoaceae), Anysberg Nature Reserve

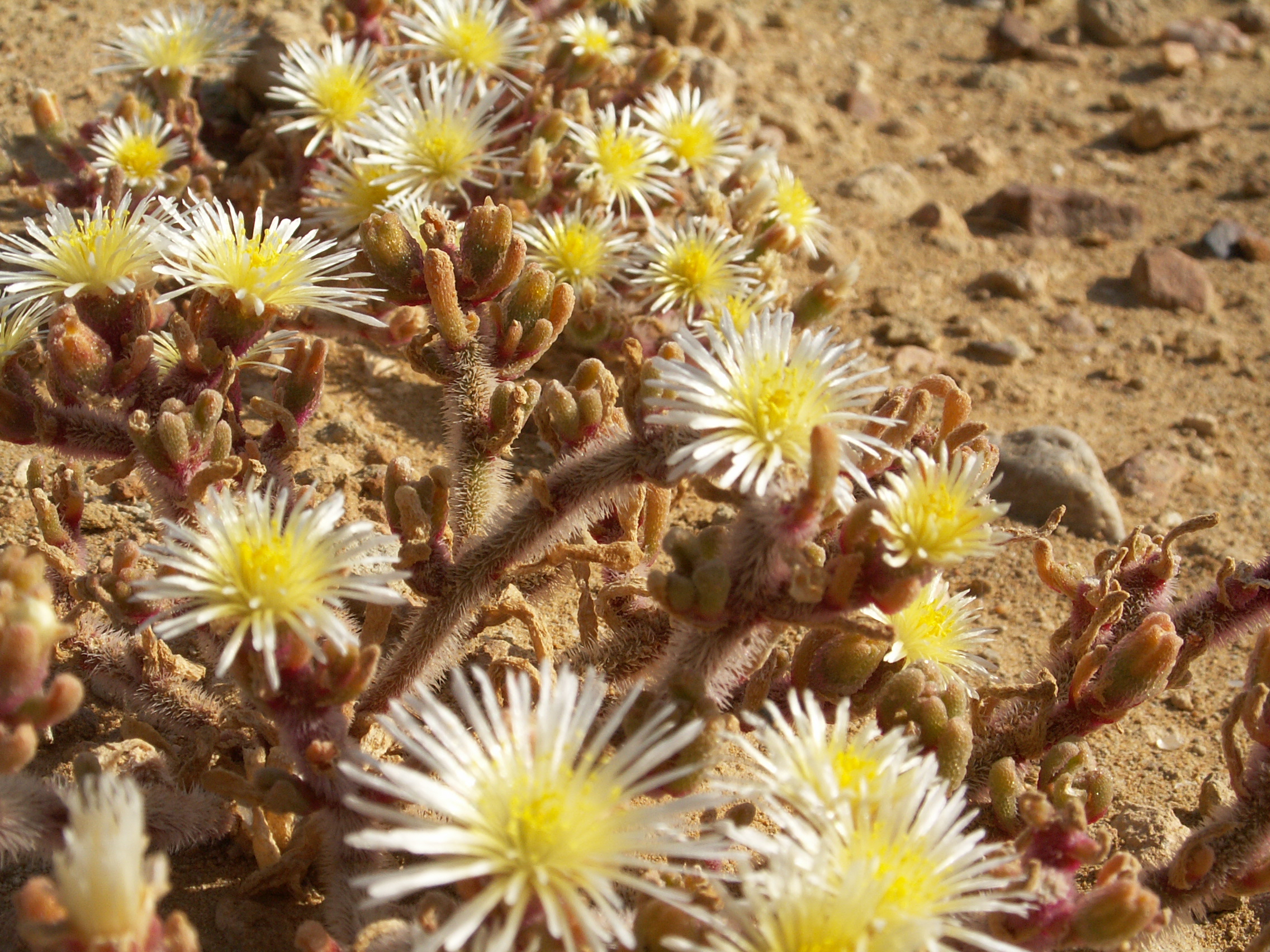
Succulents, Anysberg Nature Reserve

== External reference ==
- Official website
