= Murraysburg =

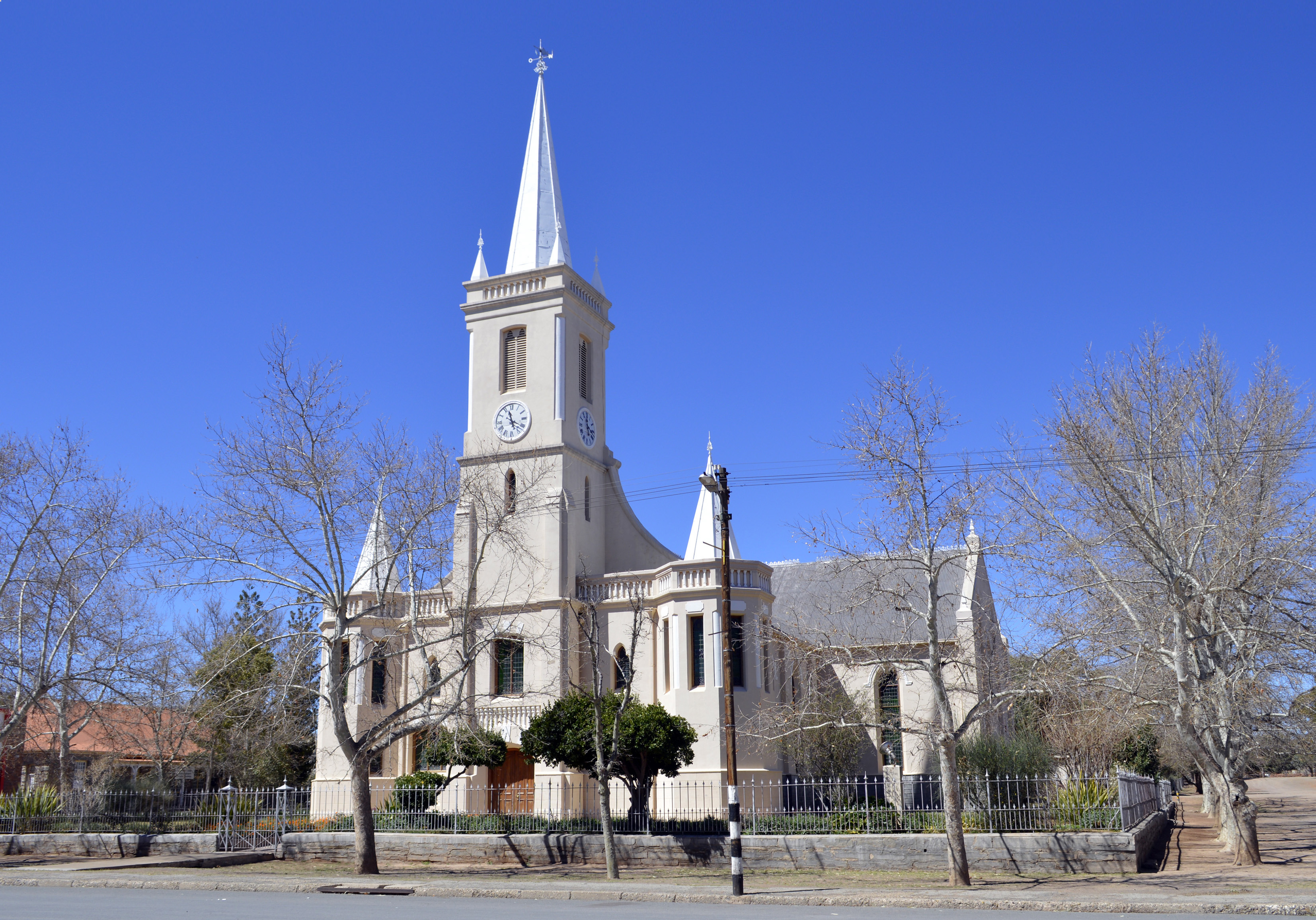
- Dutch Reformed Church, Murraysburg

- Location within Western Cape Location within South Africa
- Coordinates: 31°57′S 23°46′E
- Country: South Africa
- Province: Western Cape
- District: Central Karoo
- Municipality: Beaufort West

Area
  - Total: 69.3 km^{2} (26.8 sq mi)

Population (2011)
  - Total: 5,069
  - Density: 73.1/km^{2} (189/sq mi)

Racial makeup (2011)
  - Black African: 18.4%
  - Coloured: 80.7%
  - Indian/Asian: 0.3%
  - White: 0.5%
  - Other: 0.2%

First languages (2011)
  - Afrikaans: 87.6%
  - Xhosa: 9.8%
  - English: 1.0%
  - Other: 1.6%
- Time zone: UTC+2 (SAST)
- Postal code (street): 6995
- PO box: 6995
- Area code: 049

Murraysburg is an Afrikaans speaking town of approximately 5,000 people in the Western Cape province of South Africa. It is situated in the far northeast of the province, about 540 kilometres (340 mi) from the provincial capital Cape Town, and 80 kilometres (50 mi) west of Graaff-Reinet. It is governed as part of the Beaufort West Local Municipality within the Central Karoo District Municipality.

Murraysburg is situated on the R63 regional road, which connects it to the N1 and N12 national roads to the west and the N9 to the east. It is a distance of 620 kilometres (385 mi) from Cape Town by road, and 345 kilometres (214 mi) from Port Elizabeth.

== History ==
Murraysburg, which lies in the north-east of the Western Cape of South Africa, was founded in 1856 on a farm named "Eenzaamheid" (Dutch for "loneliness") and became a municipality in July 1883. It was named after the Reverend Andrew Murray Snr, who was minister of Graaff-Reinet, and Barend O. J. Burger, who played a role in the establishment of the town. An original condition for the purchase of any residential plot in Murraysburg was that the plot had to be fenced with a quince hedge. This unexplained rule meant that Murraysburg once had the largest quantity of quince hedging in the world.

== Demographics ==
According to the 2011 census, Murraysburg has a population of 5,069 people in 1,255 households. 80.7% of these people described themselves as "Coloured", while 18.4% described themselves as "Black African". 87.6% spoke Afrikaans as their first language, while 9.8% spoke Xhosa and 1.0% spoke English.

== Infrastructure ==
The town has public primary and secondary schools, a public library, a provincially aided hospital, a police station and a magistrate's court.

=== Water supply ===
During the mid-1800s a water conduit was constructed that delivered an uninterrupted water supply from the Buffels River to town, and lei water furrows distributed this to irrigated properties. A 1988 flood damaged the conduit, and the municipality hesitated to fix it, allowing it to fall into disrepair by the late 1990s.

In 2007, new resident Chris Barr found that Murraysburg had very limited access to water. This was hampering the town's agricultural potential, despite its very fertile soil. Barr and local farmer Izak van der Merwe founded a development council to replace the former Murraysburg Environmental Forum. The Rooidamme water project was conceived as a way of visually creating hope for the town. During September to December 2017, local contractors utilized a R1.5 million grant from the Western Cape’s sustainable resource programme to invigorate the town’s water scheme, and the Water Affairs department renewed the town's water license.

=== Garlic farming ===
The Murraysburg heritage garlic cultivar had long been cultivated in the area. Garlic was identified as a labour intensive crop that would be resilient in the harsh climate. A 2016 pilot project introduced commercially valuable Egyptian white garlic, besides the local heritage garlic, and some 1.3 metric ton was harvested. In 2018, some 10,000 m^{2} of croplands around town were planted, and the yield was divided between harvesting and replanting. A failed vegetable project, initiated but not sustained by government, was also dedicated to garlic.

The town's Rooidamme water project, initiated by the community, was instrumental in placing these areas under irrigation. A company was formed by two residents, employing several residents and supplying several “out growers”. Women are involved in the packing of the garlic bulbs, with a warehouse planned. The 2020 harvest was expected to improve on that of 2019.
