= Districts of South Africa =

The nine provinces of South Africa are divided into 52 districts (sing. district, Zulu: isifunda; Xhosa: isithili; Afrikaans: distrikte; Northern Sotho: selete; Tswana: kgaolo; Sotho: setereke; Tsonga: xifundza; Swazi: sigodzi; Venda: tshiṱiriki; Southern Ndebele: isiyingi), which are either metropolitan or district municipalities. They are the second level of administrative division, below the provinces and (in the case of district municipalities) above the local municipalities.

As a consequence of the 12th amendment of the Constitution in December 2005, which altered provincial boundaries, the number of districts was reduced from 53. Another effect of the amendment is that each district is now completely contained within a single province, thus eliminating cross-border districts. The districts also cover the entire area of the continental republic.

== Types of district ==
There are two types of municipality at the district level. Most of the country is covered by the 44 district municipalities, which are divided into local municipalities and share responsibilities with them. The eight largest urban agglomerations are governed by metropolitan municipalities, which act as both local and district municipalities.

== District municipality ==
A district municipality or Category C municipality is a municipality which executes some of the functions of local government for a district. The district municipality will in turn comprise several local municipalities, with which it shares the functions of local government. District municipalities are seen as successors to former Regional Services Councils (RSC).

The Constitution, section 155.1.a, defines "Category C" municipalities. The Municipal Structures Act states that areas not eligible to have a metropolitan municipality must have a district municipality.

District municipalities have a municipality code that consists of the letters "DC" followed by a number from 1 to 48. The "DC" reflects the term for the elected political executive "District Councils".

=== District management areas ===
Currently all district municipalities are completely divided into local municipalities. However, before the alteration of municipal boundaries which occurred at the 2011 elections, some areas of the country did not fall within any local municipality. This usually occurred in areas with a very low population density, for example national parks and nature reserves. In these areas, which were known as District Management Areas, all local government services were provided by the district municipality.

== List ==
The following map depicts the provinces and districts of South Africa. The district municipalities are labelled with numbers that correspond to their district code, while the metropolitan municipalities are labelled with letters that correspond to their names. Further details of the districts are listed in the table that follows the image.

Map key	Name	Code	Province	Seat	Area (km^{2})	Population (2016)	Pop. density (per km^{2})
44	Alfred Nzo District Municipality	DC44	Eastern Cape	Mount Ayliff	10,731	867,864	80.9
25	Amajuba District Municipality	DC25	KwaZulu-Natal	Newcastle	7,102	531,327	74.8
12	Amathole District Municipality	DC12	Eastern Cape	East London	21,117	880,790	41.7
37	Bojanala Platinum District Municipality	DC37	North West	Rustenburg	18,333	1,657,148	90.4
B	Buffalo City Metropolitan Municipality	BUF	Eastern Cape	East London	2,750	834,997	303.6
2	Cape Winelands District Municipality	DC2	Western Cape	Worcester	21,473	866,001	40.3
35	Capricorn District Municipality	DC35	Limpopo	Polokwane	21,705	1,330,436	61.3
5	Central Karoo District Municipality	DC5	Western Cape	Beaufort West	38,854	74,247	1.9
13	Chris Hani District Municipality	DC13	Eastern Cape	Komani	36,407	840,055	23.1
C	City of Cape Town Metropolitan Municipality	CPT	Western Cape	Cape Town	2,446	4,005,016	1,637.6
J	City of Johannesburg Metropolitan Municipality	JHB	Gauteng	Johannesburg	1,645	4,949,347	3,008.8
T	City of Tshwane Metropolitan Municipality	TSH	Gauteng	Pretoria	6,298	3,275,152	520.0
40	Dr Kenneth Kaunda District Municipality	DC40	North West	Klerksdorp	14,671	742,821	50.6
39	Dr Ruth Segomotsi Mompati District Municipality	DC39	North West	Vryburg	43,764	459,357	10.5
32	Ehlanzeni District Municipality	DC32	Mpumalanga	Mbombela	27,896	1,754,931	62.9
Ek	Ekurhuleni Metropolitan Municipality	EKU	Gauteng	Germiston	1,975	3,379,104	1,710.6
Et	eThekwini Metropolitan Municipality	ETH	KwaZulu-Natal	Durban	2,556	3,702,231	1,448.5
20	Fezile Dabi District Municipality	DC20	Free State	Sasolburg	20,668	494,777	23.9
9	Frances Baard District Municipality	DC9	Northern Cape	Kimberley	12,836	387,741	30.2
4	Garden Route District Municipality	DC4	Western Cape	George	23,331	611,278	26.2
30	Gert Sibande District Municipality	DC30	Mpumalanga	Ermelo	31,841	1,135,409	35.7
43	Harry Gwala District Municipality	DC43	KwaZulu-Natal	Ixopo	10,386	510,865	49.2
29	iLembe District Municipality	DC29	KwaZulu-Natal	KwaDukuza	3,269	657,612	201.2
14	Joe Gqabi District Municipality	DC14	Eastern Cape	Barkly East	25,617	372,912	14.6
45	John Taolo Gaetsewe District Municipality	DC45	Northern Cape	Kuruman	27,322	242,264	8.9
28	King Cetshwayo District Municipality	DC28	KwaZulu-Natal	Richards Bay	8,213	971,135	118.2
18	Lejweleputswa District Municipality	DC18	Free State	Welkom	32,287	646,920	20.0
M	Mangaung Metropolitan Municipality	MAN	Free State	Bloemfontein	9,886	787,803	79.7
33	Mopani District Municipality	DC33	Limpopo	Giyani	20,011	1,159,185	57.9
6	Namakwa District Municipality	DC6	Northern Cape	Springbok	126,836	115,488	0.9
N	Nelson Mandela Bay Metropolitan Municipality	NMA	Eastern Cape	Port Elizabeth	1,957	1,263,051	645.4
38	Ngaka Modiri Molema District Municipality	DC38	North West	Mahikeng	28,114	889,108	31.6
31	Nkangala District Municipality	DC31	Mpumalanga	Middelburg	16,758	1,445,624	86.3
15	OR Tambo District Municipality	DC15	Eastern Cape	Mthatha	12,141	1,457,384	120.0
3	Overberg District Municipality	DC3	Western Cape	Bredasdorp	12,239	286,786	23.4
7	Pixley ka Seme District Municipality	DC7	Northern Cape	De Aar	103,411	195,595	1.9
10	Sarah Baartman District Municipality	DC10	Eastern Cape	Port Elizabeth	58,245	479,923	8.2
42	Sedibeng District Municipality	DC42	Gauteng	Vereeniging	4,173	957,528	229.5
47	Sekhukhune District Municipality	DC47	Limpopo	Groblersdal	13,528	1,169,762	86.5
19	Thabo Mofutsanyana District Municipality	DC19	Free State	Phuthaditjhaba	32,734	779,330	23.8
21	Ugu District Municipality	DC21	KwaZulu-Natal	Port Shepstone	4,791	753,336	157.2
22	uMgungundlovu District Municipality	DC22	KwaZulu-Natal	Pietermaritzburg	9,602	1,095,865	114.1
27	uMkhanyakude District Municipality	DC27	KwaZulu-Natal	Mkuze	13,855	689,090	49.7
24	uMzinyathi District Municipality	DC24	KwaZulu-Natal	Dundee	8,652	554,882	64.1
23	uThukela District Municipality	DC23	KwaZulu-Natal	Ladysmith	11,134	706,588	63.5
34	Vhembe District Municipality	DC34	Limpopo	Thohoyandou	25,596	1,393,949	54.5
36	Waterberg District Municipality	DC36	Limpopo	Modimolle	44,913	745,758	16.6
1	West Coast District Municipality	DC1	Western Cape	Moorreesburg	31,119	436,403	14.0
48	West Rand District Municipality	DC48	Gauteng	Randfontein	4,087	838,594	205.2
16	Xhariep District Municipality	DC16	Free State	Trompsburg	34,250	125,884	3.7
8	ZF Mgcawu District Municipality	DC8	Northern Cape	Upington	102,484	252,692	2.5
26	Zululand District Municipality	DC26	KwaZulu-Natal	Ulundi	14,799	892,310	60.3

== Boundary alignment ==
Several projects are underway to align various services with the district boundaries. These include:

- Magisterial districts
- Police wards

== Controversy ==
South Africa's official opposition, the Democratic Alliance, believes that the districts add an unnecessary fourth layer of government (between provinces and municipalities) and has called for them to be eliminated.

== See also ==
- Municipalities of South Africa
- List of municipalities in South Africa
- Government of South Africa

== Sources ==
- Demarcation Board
- Government Communication & Information Services (2005) Categories of municipalities
- Parliament of the Republic of South Africa (1996) Constitution of the Republic of South Africa, Chapter 7: Local Government
- South African Local Government Association
