= Central Karoo District Municipality =

Central Karoo Sentraal Karoo
- District municipality
- Seal

- Location in South Africa

- Local municipalities within the Central Karoo
- Coordinates: 32°40′S 22°15′E
- Country: South Africa
- Province: Western Cape
- Seat: Beaufort West
- Local municipalities: List: Laingsburg; Prince Albert; Beaufort West

Government
  - Type: Municipal council
  - Mayor: J. Botha (ANC)

Area
  - Total: 38,854 km^{2} (15,002 sq mi)

Population (2011)
  - Total: 71,011
  - Density: 1.8276/km^{2} (4.7336/sq mi)

Racial makeup (2011)
  - Black African: 12.7%
  - Coloured: 76.2%
  - Indian/Asian: 0.4%
  - White: 10.1%

First languages (2011)
  - Afrikaans: 87.2%
  - Xhosa: 7.8%
  - English: 2.6%
  - Other: 2.4%
- Time zone: UTC+2 (SAST)
- Municipal code: DC5

The Central Karoo District Municipality (Afrikaans: Sentraal Karoo-distriksmunisipaliteit) is a district municipality located in the Western Cape province of South Africa. Its municipality code is DC5.

== Geography ==
The Central Karoo District Municipality is divided into three local municipalities, which are described in the following table.

Name	Seat	Population (2011)	Area (km^{2})	Density (inhabitants/km^{2})
Laingsburg	Laingsburg	8,289	8,784	0.94
Prince Albert	Prince Albert	13,136	8,153	1.61
Beaufort West	Beaufort West	49,586	21,917	2.26
Total		71,011	38,854	1.83

=== Adjacent municipalities ===
- Pixley ka Seme District Municipality, Northern Cape (northeast)
- Sarah Baartman District Municipality, Eastern Cape (east)
- Garden Route District Municipality (south)
- Cape Winelands District Municipality (southwest)
- Namakwa District Municipality, Northern Cape (northwest)

== Demographics ==
The following statistics are from the 2011 Census. Note that due to fuzzing applied to statistics, columns may not sum to exactly the indicated total.

=== First language ===
Language	Population	%
Afrikaans	60,074	87.2%
Xhosa	5,346	7.8%
English	1,789	2.6%
Tswana	399	0.6%
Sotho	322	0.5%
Zulu	182	0.3%
Sign language	179	0.3%
Ndebele	117	0.2%
Northern Sotho	93	0.1%
Venda	60	0.1%
Swazi	29	0.0%
Tsonga	18	0.0%
Other	301	0.4%
Total	68,909	
Not applicable	2,101	

=== Race ===
Race	Population	%
Coloured	54,076	76.2%
Black African	9,045	12.7%
White	7,197	10.1%
Indian or Asian	300	0.4%
Other	394	0.6%
Total	71,011	

=== Gender ===
Gender	Population	%
Female	36,244	51.0%
Male	34,767	49.0%
Total	71,011	

=== Age ===
Age group	Population	%
0–4	7,679	10.8%
5–9	7,030	9.9%
10–14	6,976	9.8%
15–19	6,159	8.7%
20–24	5,672	8.0%
25–29	5,343	7.5%
30–34	4,740	6.7%
35–39	4,773	6.7%
40–44	4,786	6.7%
45–49	4,279	6.0%
50–54	3,811	5.4%
55–59	3,047	4.3%
60–64	2,344	3.3%
65–69	1,636	2.3%
70–74	1,243	1.8%
75–79	751	1.1%
80–84	405	0.6%
85+	203	0.3%
Total	71,011	

== Politics ==
The council of the Central Karoo District Municipality consists of thirteen councillors. Six councillors are directly elected by party-list proportional representation, and seven are appointed by the councils of the local municipalities in the district: five by Beaufort West and one each by Laingsburg and Prince Albert.

As of February 2017 there are six councillors from the Democratic Alliance (DA), four from the African National Congress (ANC), two from the Karoo Gemeenskap Party (KGP) and one from the Karoo Democratic Force (KDF). The DA, KGP and KDF are in a coalition which governs the council. The following table shows the detailed composition of the council.

Party	Directly elected	Appointed by local councils			Total
Party	Directly elected	Laingsburg	Prince Albert	Beaufort West	Total
DA	3	1		2	6
ANC	2			2	4
Karoo Gemeenskap Party	1		1		2
Karoo Democratic Force	0			1	1

The following table shows the results of the election of the six directly elected councillors.

Party	Votes	Vote %	Seats
DA	11,037	45.4%	3
ANC	9,811	40.4%	2
Karoo Gemeenskap Party	1,807	7.4%	1
Karoo Democratic Force	1,001	4.1%	0
EFF	288	1.2%	0
VF+	208	0.9%	0
Independent Civic Organisation of South Africa	134	0.6%	0
Total	24,286		6
Valid votes	24,286	98.6%	
Spoilt votes	346	1.4%	
Total votes cast	24,632		
Registered voters	37,907		
Turnout percentage	65.0%		
