= Jacques Guérin =

20th-century French industrialist and collector

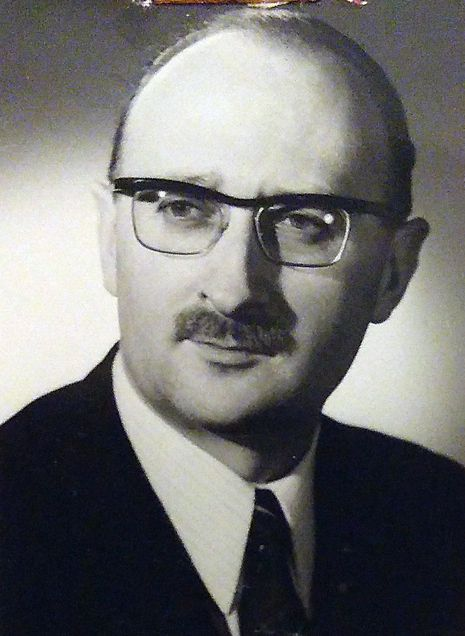
- Guérin (1980)
- Born: 23 June 1902; Paris, France
- Died: 6 August 2000 (aged 98); Luzarches, Seine-et-Oise, France
- Education: University of Toulouse
- Occupation(s): Industrialist-entrepreneur; Perfumier
- Employer: Maison D'Orsay
- Partner: Jean Boy
- Parent(s): Jeanne Louise Guérin; Israel Gaston Monteux

Jacques Guérin (23 June 1902 - 6 August 2000) was a French industrialist and book collector. For 46 years, he presided over Maison D'Orsay, a Paris perfumery. Guérin was well-known for his large collection of books and manuscripts, including a significant number of Marcel Proust's papers. At its peak, his library contained more than 2,000 items, including many first editions and manuscripts. In 1998, a Arthur Rimbaud manuscript in his possession sold to the French state for 2.9 million francs.

== Early life and education ==
Jacques Guérin was born in Paris, the eldest illegitimate child of socialites Jeanne Louise Guérin and Israel Gaston Monteux. His younger brother Jean (1903-1966) later became an artist. Their mother Jeanne was a businesswoman and art collector who, in 1916, acquired the perfumery D'Orsay with Théophile Bader. The pair revived the failing business; by 1931, despite Bader's involvement having ended years before, five million bottles of perfume were being sold annually. D'Orsay had its own printing house and packaging design studio, as well as a factory in Puteaux-sur-Seine. Jacques and Jean's father Israel (1853-1927) was also an art collector and industrialist who ran an international chain of shoe shops called Chaussures Raoul. One source described Israel as Jeanne's companion.

At the time of her sons' births, Jeanne Louise Guérin was in a childless marriage. She had separated from her husband Jules Giraud in 1900 but did not divorce him until much later. Jacques and Jean Guérin were raised by a nanny on the outskirts of Paris. Guérin was acutely sensitive to the stigma that accompanied his illegitimacy and believed it was the reason he was not raised by his mother. According to at least one source, Guérin blamed his father for his illegitimacy and hated him for it. Another source claimed that Jacques and Jean saw both of their parents on a regular basis. Guérin was convinced that his parents were deeply in love with each other and unsuccessfully tried to persuade them to marry when his father's wife died in 1924.

While still a young man, Guérin was sent by his mother to study chemistry at the University of Toulouse. There, he befriended the sculptor Apel·les Fenosa, whose works he later avidly collected. On his return from Toulouse he worked alongside his mother at Maison D'Orsay. He completed his military service at Remiremont.

== Career ==
=== Perfumier ===
By 1936, Jeanne Louise Guérin had repaid all her investors, leaving her the sole owner. Jacques Guérin took over as controlling director at Maison D'Orsay in 1936, retiring in 1982 after 46 years. A number of the perfumes created under his direction resonated positively with customers. Several friends from Guérin's circle were able to share in his commercial success, notably René Lalique, who created perfume bottles for the business.

=== Book collector ===
Jacques Guérin discovered his passion for rare books and authors' manuscripts while he was still young. At age 18, he purchased a first edition of L'Hérésiarque et Cie by the then-unknown author Guillaume Apollinaire, for 13 francs. It would later come to be considered a collectible. Other notable acquisitions he made included the original manuscripts for Le Diable au corps and Le Bal du comte d'Orgel by Raymond Radiguet, purchased from Jean Cocteau; a number of the notebooks containing the handwritten drafts for Marcel Proust's À la recherche du temps perdu; letters to Proust from his widowed sister-in-law Marthe Amiot; the first set of corrected proofs for Du côté de chez Swann; and the original manuscript for Arthur Rimbaud's Une saison en enfer. Throughout his life, he made many purchases from publisher Henri Matarasso, often enough for Matarasso to become familiarized with his tastes and preferences and arrange specific book purchases on his behalf.

Guérin also owned a large number of papers belonging to Marcel Proust, including manuscripts, letters, and photographs, which he discovered in a bookshop run by Henri Lefebvre. He contacted the Proust estate directly to purchase other materials, including some of Proust's furniture. He was gifted Proust's faux fur overcoat, which he had restored to its original quality after years of insect damage. The book Proust's Overcoat: The True Story of One Man's Passion for All Things Proust (published 2010) by Lorenza Foschini is named after the coat, considered by collectors to be one of the most significant surviving pieces of Proust's legacy. One reviewer, paraphrasing the sentiments of several commentators, has described Guérin as "not just a collector but a rescuer of all things Proustian".

In September 1947, Guérin was introduced to novelist Violette Leduc through Jean Genet, who he had met earlier that year when purchasing the manuscript for Querelle of Brest. Guérin would later receive several more Genet manuscripts as gifts from Genet himself. Genet arranged for Guérin and Leduc to meet after Guérin expressed admiration for her autobiographical first novel L'Asphyxie, which had been published the previous year. Part of his interest was reportedly due to the book's theme of deep unhappiness in childhood. Guérin and Leduc immediately became very close friends, though Leduc's intense romantic interest (considered an "obsession" by some sources) in Guérin was unrequited. He became her patron-sponsor and financed the production of luxury editions of two of her novels, L'Affamée and Thérèse et Isabelle, both of which she dedicated to him. Thérèse et Isabelle faced difficulties getting published due to its sexual candour, but Guérin eventually arranged for the novel's private publication in 1955/56, albeit still heavily censored, and with only 28 copies printed.

Guérin's book collection reached its greatest extent in 1982. At that point Jacques Guérin's library contained more than 2,000 items, ranging from Montaigne to Genet, and included the original eight-volume edition of Molière. In 1983, he organised the first of a succession of manuscript sales from his collection. The National Library of France purchased a number of items, including the Proust manuscripts. His eighth sale, organised by his friend Michel Castaing, saw the purchase of the Rimbaud manuscript by the French state for 2.9 million francs. Ten of Rinaud's signed poems were auctioned, as were two original letters by Isidore Ducasse which, according to press reports at the time, had been believed lost until they appeared in the listing for the sale.

== Personal life ==
Following his retirement from D'Orsay, Guérin divided his time between his Paris apartment along the Rue Murillo, the factory complex at Puteaux-sur-Seine and his country estate at Luzarches. For nearly 50 years, Guérin lived with his partner, the Paris milliner Jean Boy (1907-1980), who came originally from Arcachon. His brother Jean achieved a measure of notability as an artist and, in 1991, Guérin gifted his younger brother's collection of paintings to the city of Chartres. Through his father's daughter, his half-sister Germaine Monteux, Jacques Guérin was uncle to the cinematographer François Reichenbach.

Guérin's social circle included many leading literary and art figures, with Erik Satie, Pablo Picasso, Maurice Rostand, and Madeleine and Marcelin Castaing among his friends. Maurice Sachs, Jean Cocteau, Colette, Glenway Wescott, René Béhaine, Djuna Barnes, Mireille Havet, Chaïm Soutine, Abel Bonnard, and Édouard Vuillard were also in his orbit.
