= Devil in the Flesh =

Devil in the Flesh may refer to:

- Devil in the Flesh (1947 film), a 1947 French film
- Devil in the Flesh, a 1969 Italian film
- Devil in the Flesh (1986 film), a 1986 Italian film
- Devil in the Flesh (1989 film), a 1989 Australian film
- Devil in the Flesh (1998 film), a 1998 American horror film
  - Devil in the Flesh 2, a 2000 American film
- Le Diable au corps (novel) (The Devil in the Flesh), a novel by Raymond Radiguet

== See also ==
- Le Diable au corps (disambiguation)
