= Le Diable au corps =

Le Diable au corps may refer to:

- Le Diable au corps (novel), a 1923 novel by Raymond Radiguet
- Le Diable au corps (1947 film), a French film by Claude Autant-Lara, an adaptation of Radiguet's novel
- Le Diable au corps (1986 film) (Il diavolo in corpo), an Italian film by Marco Bellocchio, an adaptation of Radiguet's novel
- Le Diable au corps (1786), a 1786 novel by André-Robert Andréa de Nerciat

== See also ==
- Devil in the Flesh (disambiguation)
