= Adam and Eve (Cranach, Besançon) =

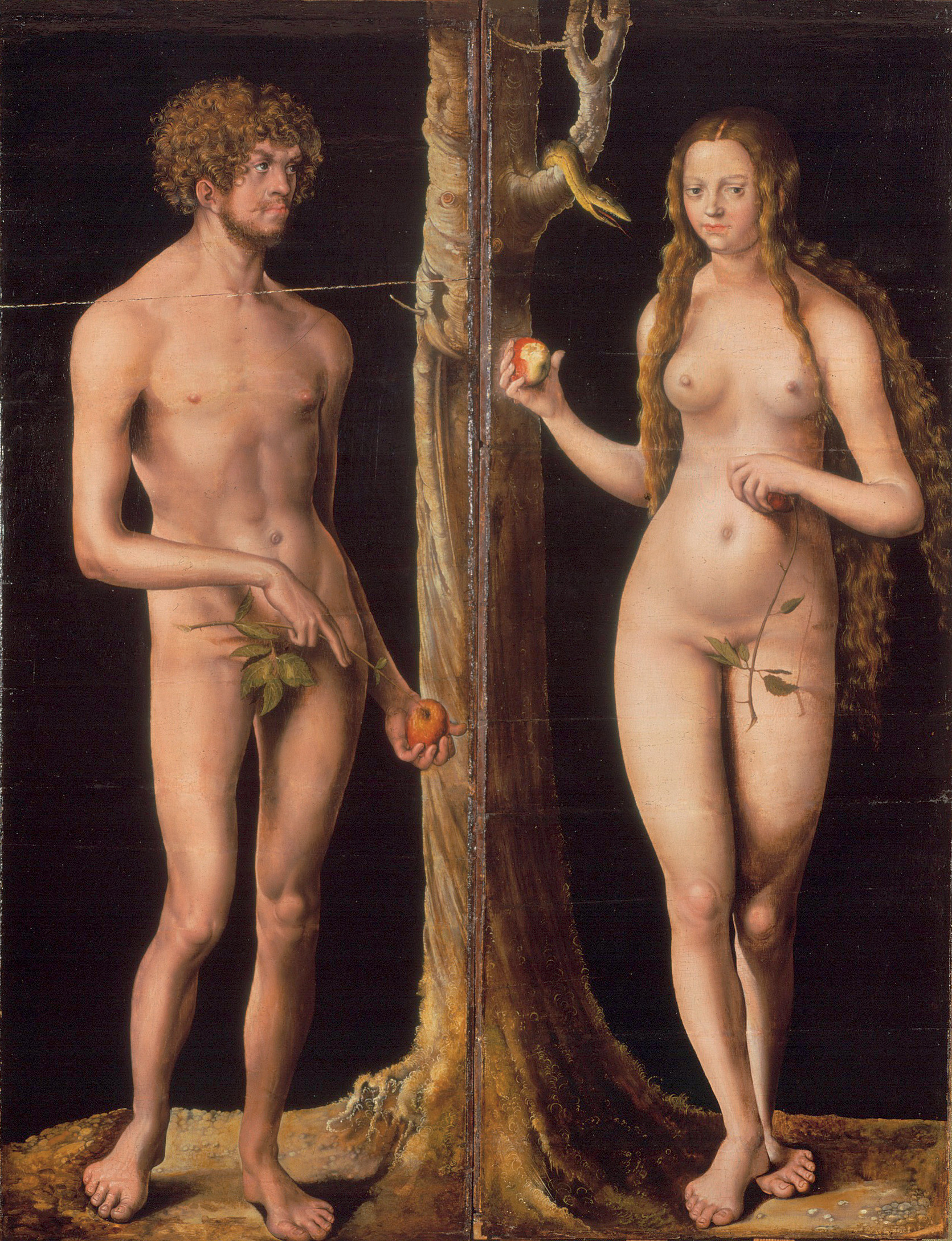

Adam and Eve is a c. 1508–1510 oil on limewood panel by Lucas Cranach the Elder, now in the Musée des Beaux-Arts et d'Archéologie de Besançon. It is one of the earliest in a series of works by the artist showing the fall of man, also including examples now in Florence and in Prague.

== See also ==
- Adam and Eve (Cranach), other works on the subject by the same painter
