= A Season in Hell =

Extended poem in prose by Arthur Rimbaud

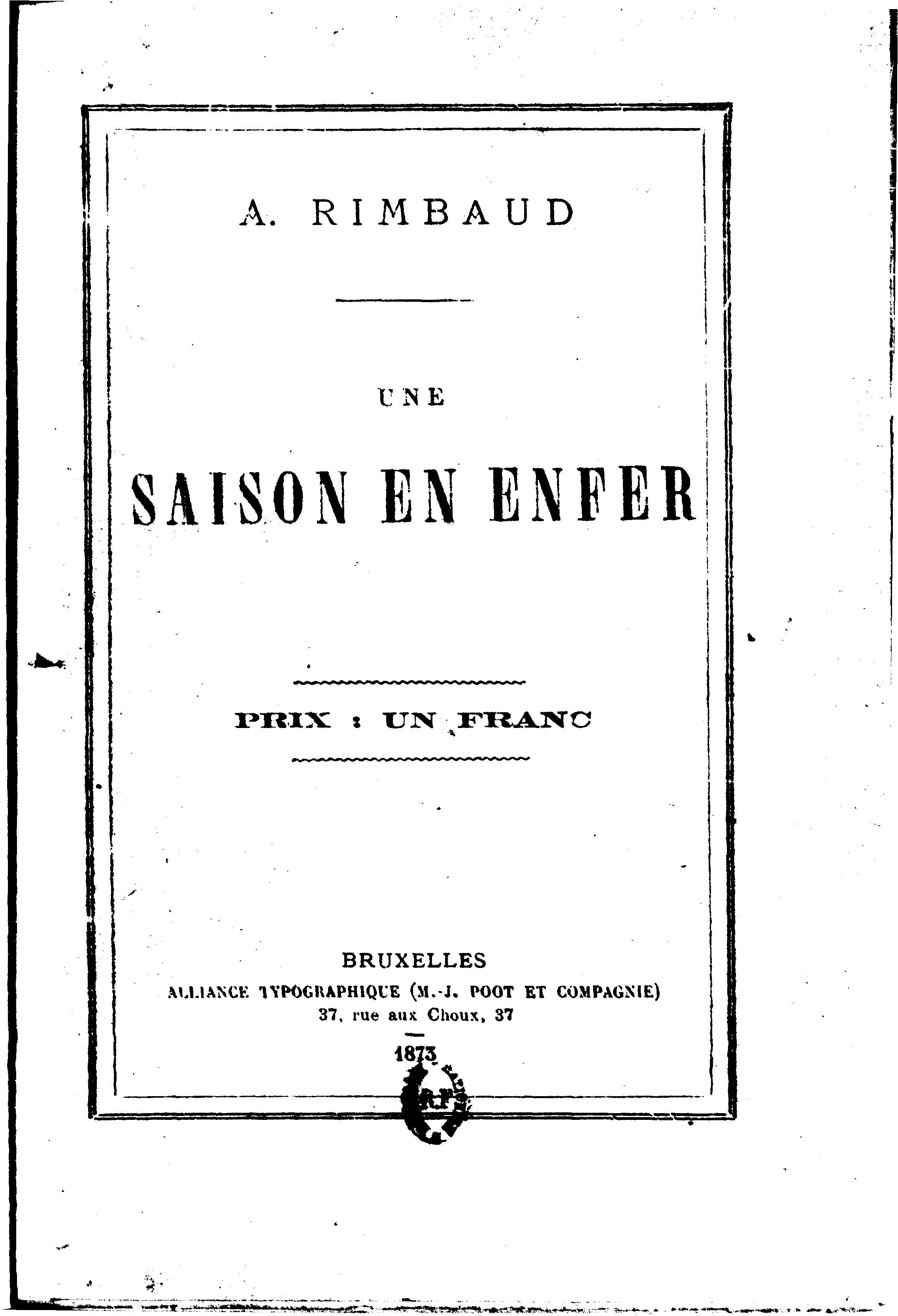
Cover of the first edition October 1873

Recording by Vincent Planchon for Audiocite.net. Part 1.

Recording by Vincent Planchon for Audiocite.net. Part 2.

Recording by Vincent Planchon for Audiocite.net. Part 3.

A Season in Hell (French: Une saison en enfer) is an extended poem in prose written and published in 1873 by French writer Arthur Rimbaud. It is the only work that was published by Rimbaud himself. The book had a considerable influence on later artists and poets, including the Surrealists.

== Writing and publication history ==
Rimbaud began writing the poem in April 1873 during a visit to his family's farm in Roche, near Charleville on the French-Belgian border. According to Bertrand Mathieu, Rimbaud wrote the work in a dilapidated barn. In the following weeks, Rimbaud traveled with poet Paul Verlaine through Belgium and to London again. They had begun a complicated relationship in spring 1872, and they quarreled frequently.

Verlaine had bouts of suicidal behavior and drunkenness. When Rimbaud announced he planned to leave while they were staying in Brussels in July 1873, Verlaine fired two shots from his revolver, wounding Rimbaud once. After subsequent threats of violence, Verlaine was arrested and incarcerated for two years of hard labour. After their parting, Rimbaud returned home to complete the work and published A Season in Hell. However, when his reputation was marred because of his actions with Verlaine, he received negative reviews and was snubbed by Parisian art and literary circles. In anger, Rimbaud burned his manuscripts and likely never wrote poetry again.

Rimbaud's first stay in London in September 1872 converted him from an imbiber of absinthe to a smoker of opium, and drinker of gin and beer. According to biographer Graham Robb, this began "as an attempt to explain why some of his [Rimbaud's] poems are so hard to understand, especially when sober". The poem was by Rimbaud himself dated April through August 1873, but these are dates of completion. He finished the work in a farmhouse in Roche, Ardennes.

== Format ==
The prose poem is loosely divided into nine parts, of varying length. They differ markedly in tone and narrative comprehensibility. However, it is a well and deliberately edited and revised text. This becomes clear if one compares the final version with the earlier versions.

- Introduction (sometimes titled with its first line, "Once, if my memory serves me well...") (French: Jadis, si je me souviens bien...) – outlines the narrator's damnation and introduces the story as "pages from the diary of a Damned soul".
- Bad Blood (Mauvais sang) – describes the narrator's Gaulish ancestry and its supposed effect on his morality and happiness.
- Night of hell (Nuit de l'enfer) – highlights the moment of the narrator's death and entry into hell.
- Delirium I: The Foolish Virgin – The Infernal Spouse (Délires I : Vierge folle – L'Époux infernal) – the most linear in its narrative, this section consists of the story of a woman (Verlaine), enslaved to her "infernal bridegroom" (Rimbaud) who deceived her and lured her love with false promises. It is likely a transparent allegory for his relationship with Verlaine.
- Delirium II: Alchemy of Words (Délires II : Alchimie du verbe) – the narrator then steps in and explains his own false hopes and broken dreams. This section is divided more clearly and contains many sections in verse (most of which are individual poems from the ensemble later called "Derniers vers" or "Vers nouveaux et chansons", albeit with significant variations). Here Rimbaud continues to develop his theory of poetry that began with his "Lettres du Voyant" ("Letters of the Seer"), but ultimately considers the whole endeavour as a failure.
- The Impossible (L'impossible) – this section is vague, but one critical response sees it as the description of an attempt on the part of the speaker to escape from hell.
- Lightning (L'éclair) – one critic states that this short section is unclear, although its tone is resigned and fatalistic, indicating a surrender on the part of the narrator.
- Morning (Matin) – this short section serves as a conclusion, where the narrator claims to have "finished my account of my hell," and "can no longer even talk".
- Farewell (Adieu) – this section alludes to a change of seasons, from Autumn to Spring. The narrator seems to have become more confident and stronger through his journey through hell, claiming he is "now able to possess the truth within one body and one soul".

== Interpretation ==
Bernard Mathieu describes A Season in Hell as "a terribly enigmatic poem", and a "brilliantly near-hysterical quarrel between the poet and his 'other'." He identifies two voices at work in the surreal narrative: "the two separate parts of Rimbaud's schizoid personality—the 'I' who is a seer/poet and the 'I' who is the incredibly hard-nosed widow Rimbaud's peasant son. One voice is wildly in love with the miracle of light and childhood, the other finds all these literary shenanigans rather damnable and 'idiotic'."

For Wallace Fowlie writing in the introduction to his 1966 University of Chicago (pub) translation, "the ultimate lesson" of this "complex"(p4) and "troublesome"(p5) text states that "poetry is one way by which life may be changed and renewed. Poetry is one possible stage in a life process. Within the limits of man's fate, the poet's language is able to express his existence although it is not able to create it."(p5) According to Mathieu: "The trouble with A Season in Hell is that it points only one way: where it's going is where it's coming from. Its greatest source of frustration, like that of every important poem, is the realization that it's impossible for any of us to escape the set limits imposed on us by 'reality'." Wallace in 1966, p5 of above-quoted work, "...(a season in Hell) testif(ies) to a modern revolt, and the kind of liberation which follows revolt".

Academic critics have arrived at many varied and often entirely incompatible conclusions as to what meaning and philosophy may or may not be contained in the text.

Among them, Henry Miller was important in introducing Rimbaud to the United States in the 1960s. He published an English translation of the book and wrote an extended essay on Rimbaud and A Season in Hell titled The Time of the Assassins. It was published by James Laughlin's New Directions, the first American publisher of Rimbaud's Illuminations.

== Translations ==
During one of her lengthy hospitalizations in Switzerland, Zelda Fitzgerald translated Une Saison en Enfer. Earlier Zelda had learned French on her own, by buying a French dictionary and painstakingly reading Raymond Radiguet's Le bal du Comte d'Orgel.

Wallace Fowlie translated the poem for his Rimbaud: Complete Works, Selected Letters in 1966.
