= Adam and Eve (Cranach) =

Paintings of Adam and Eve by Lucas Cranach the Elder include the following, depicted either together in a double portrait or separately in a pair of paintings:

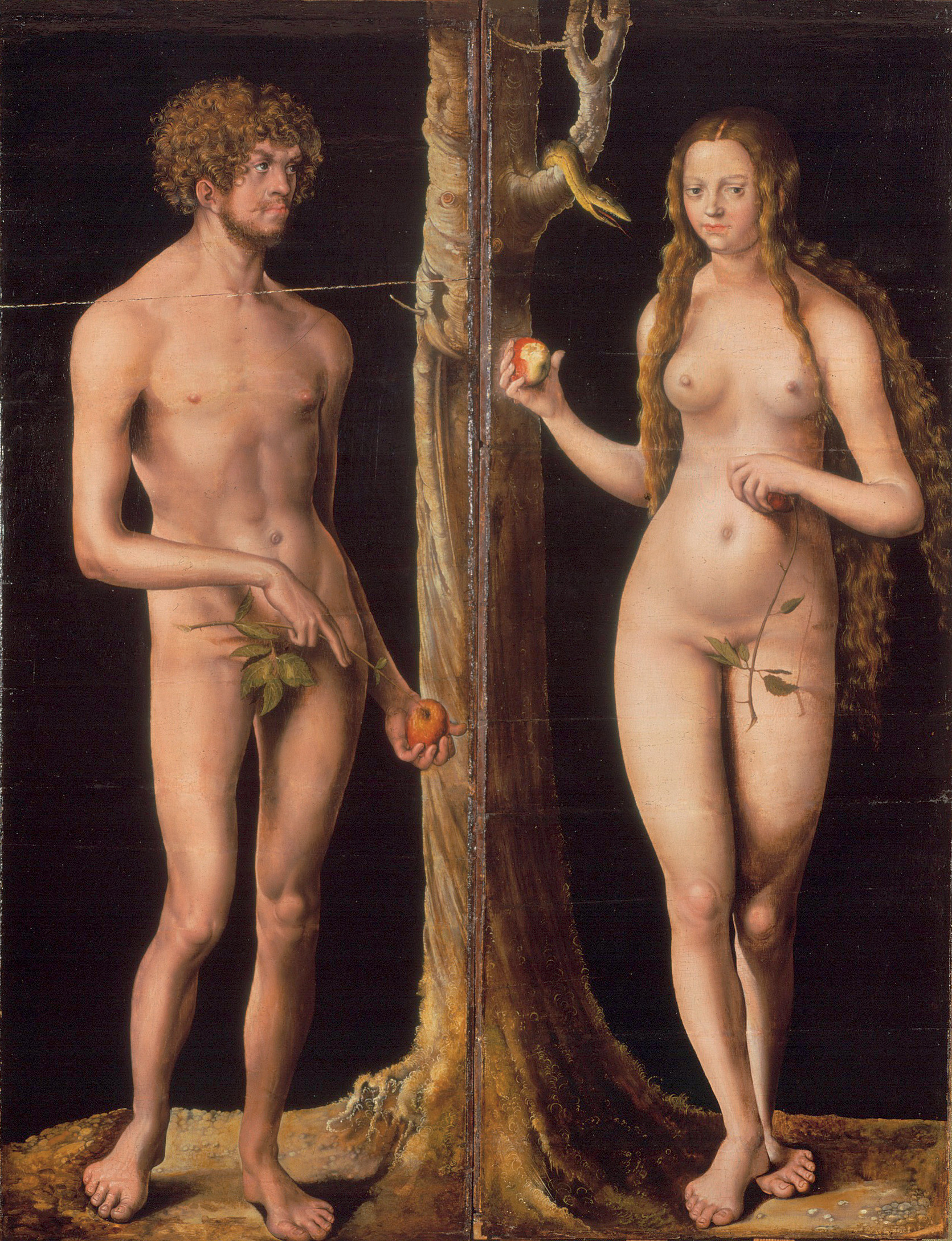
Musée des Beaux-Arts et d'Archéologie de Besançon, 1508–1510 (see Adam and Eve (Cranach, Besançon))

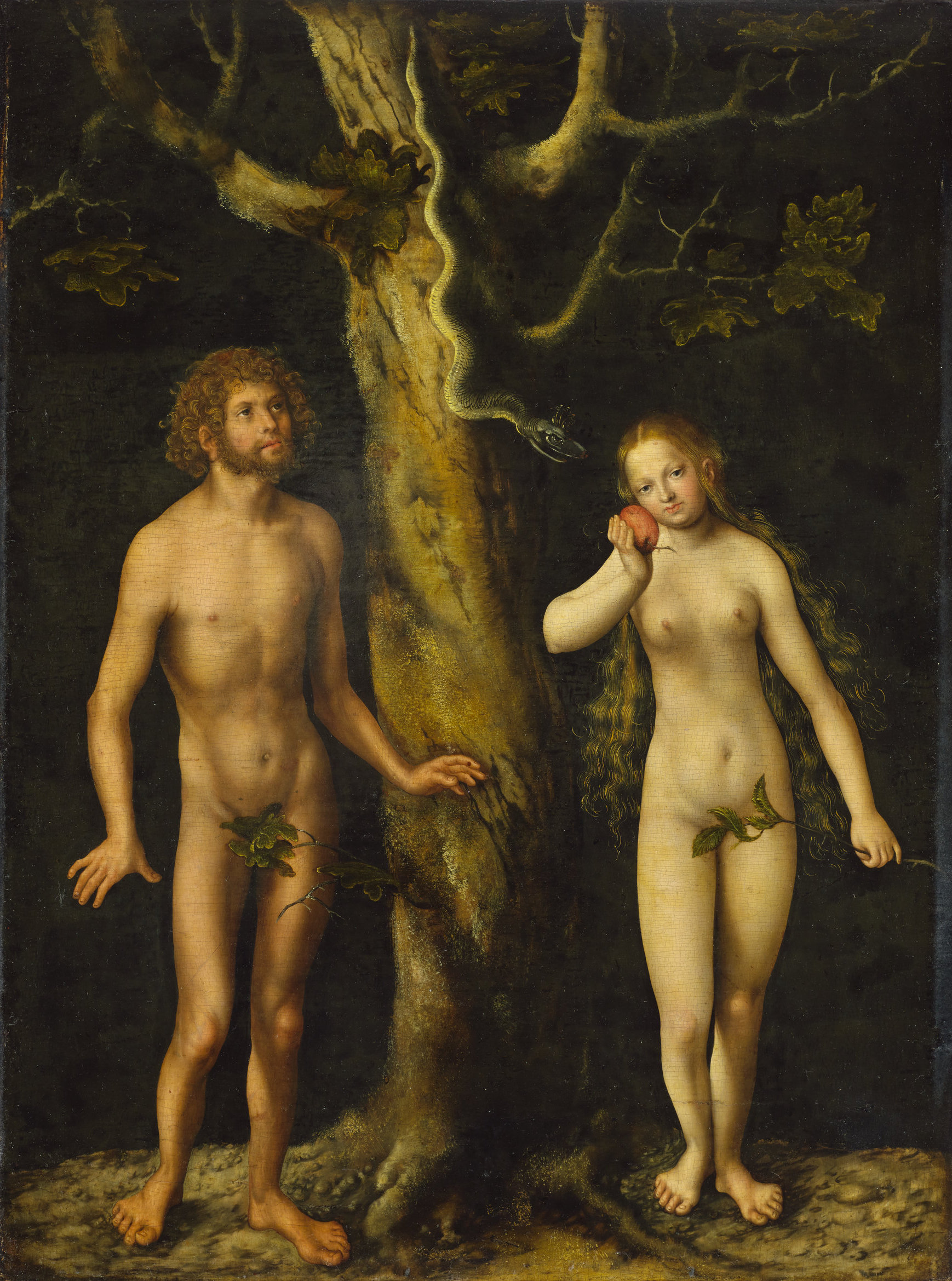
National Museum in Warsaw, Poland 1510 (Note: During his stay in Vienna, Cranach moved in the circles of some humanists close to Dürer, inspiring him to create this, his first work on subject.)

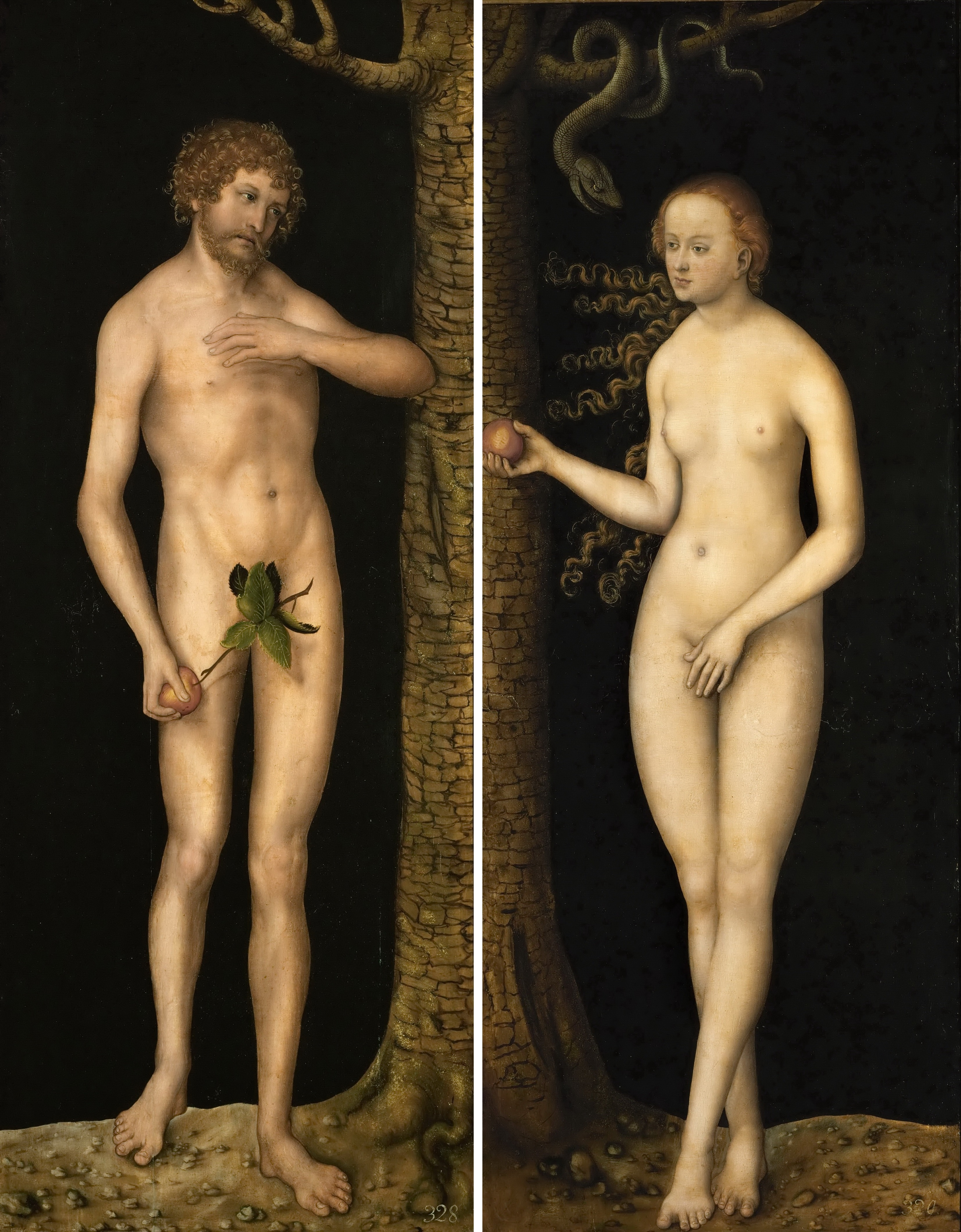
Kunsthistorisches Museum, Vienna, Austria (Note: Appears in the German television series Dark, where they are displayed in the headquarters of the cult Erit Lux) c. 1510–20

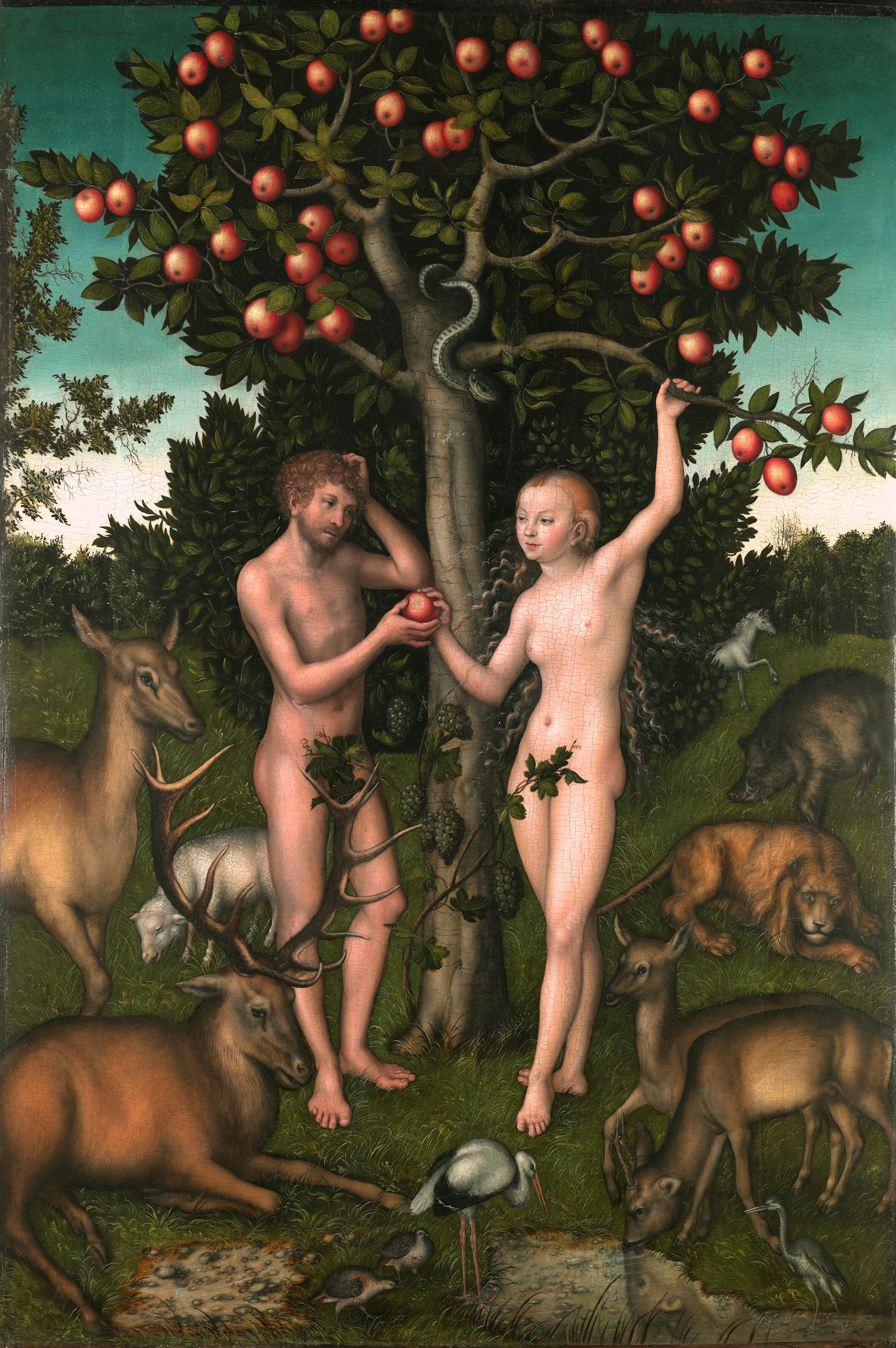
Courtauld Gallery, London, England 1526

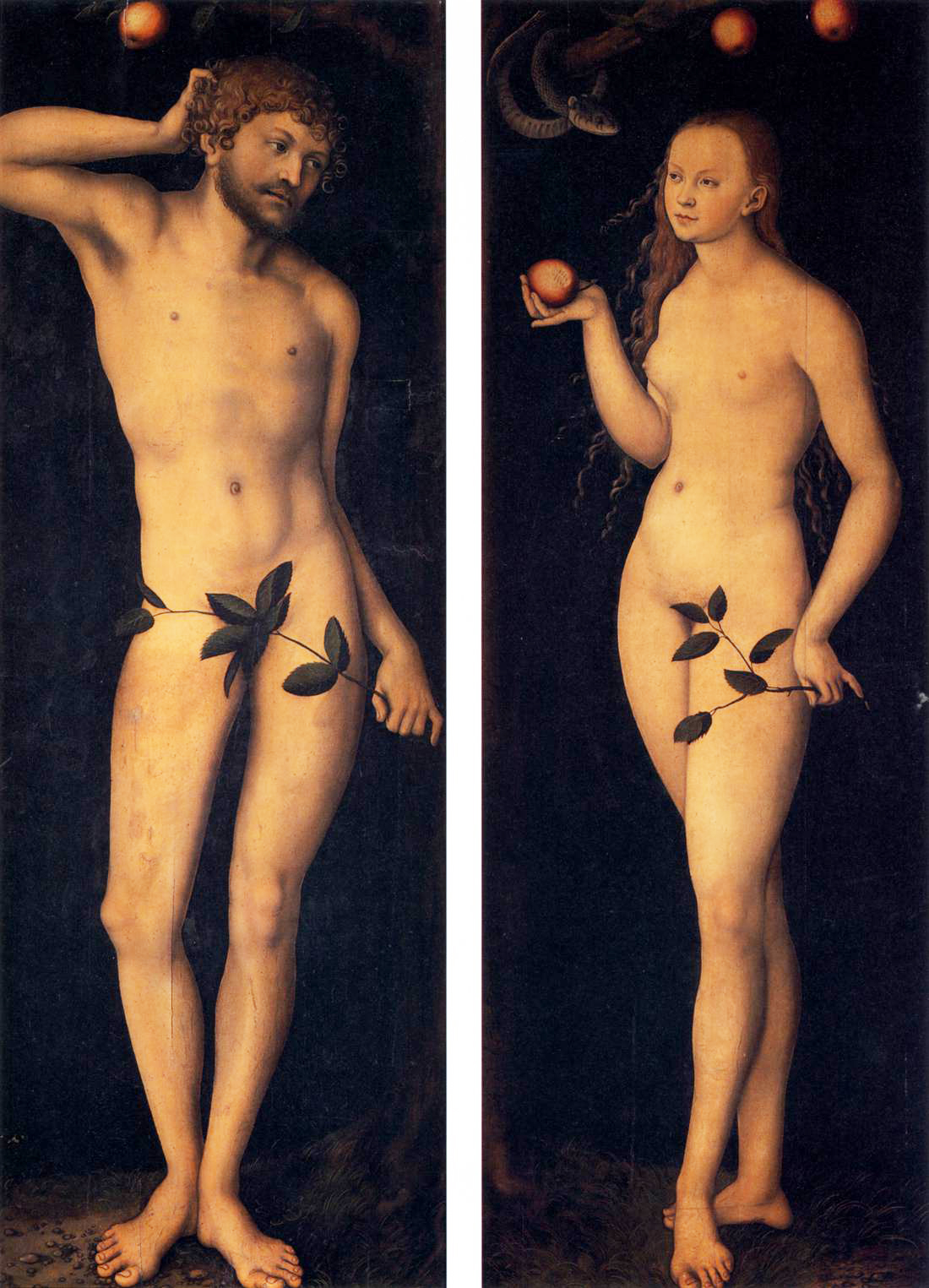
Uffizi, Florence, Italy 1528 (see Adam and Eve (Cranach, Florence)

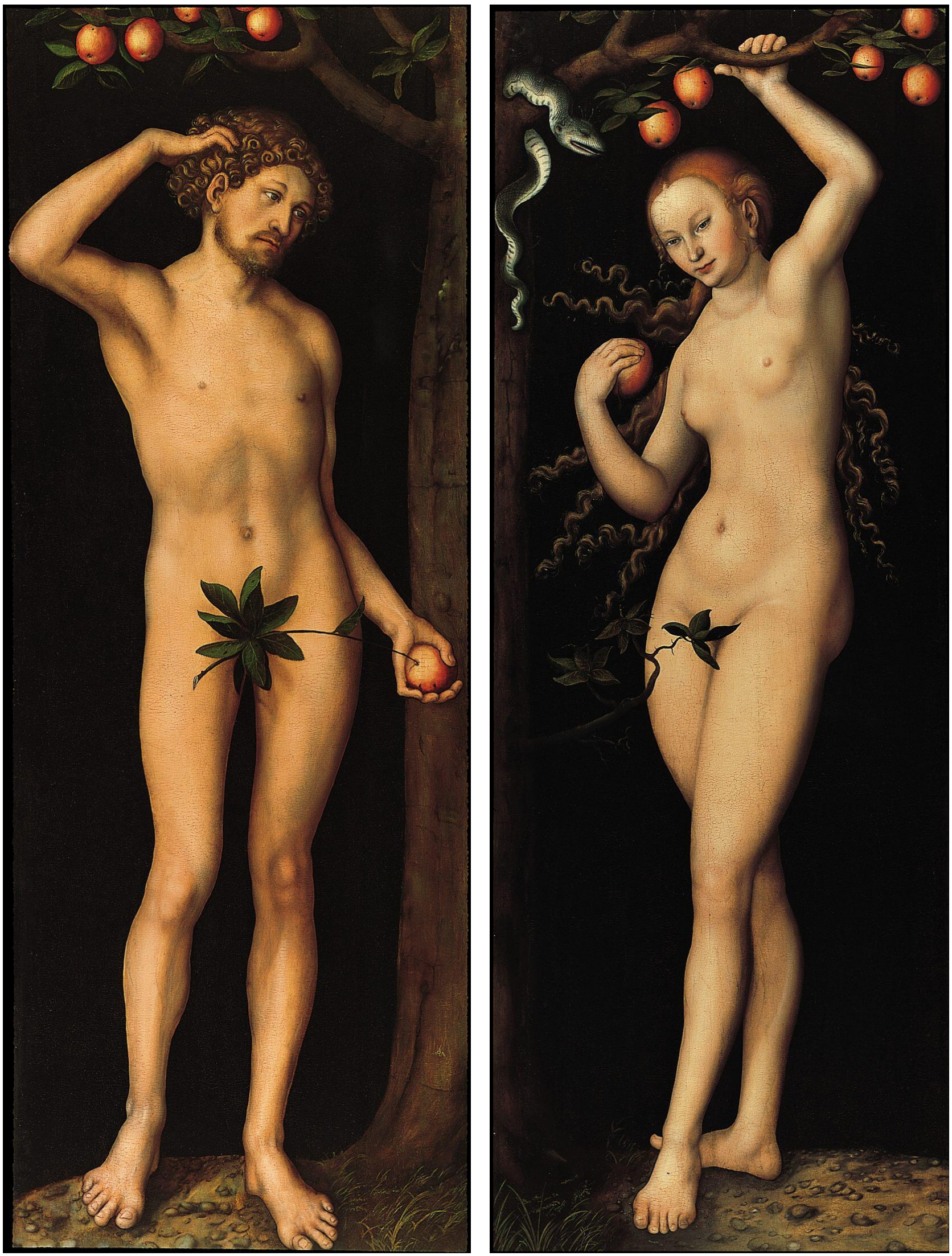
Diptych in the Norton Simon Museum, Pasadena, California, U.S. c. 1530

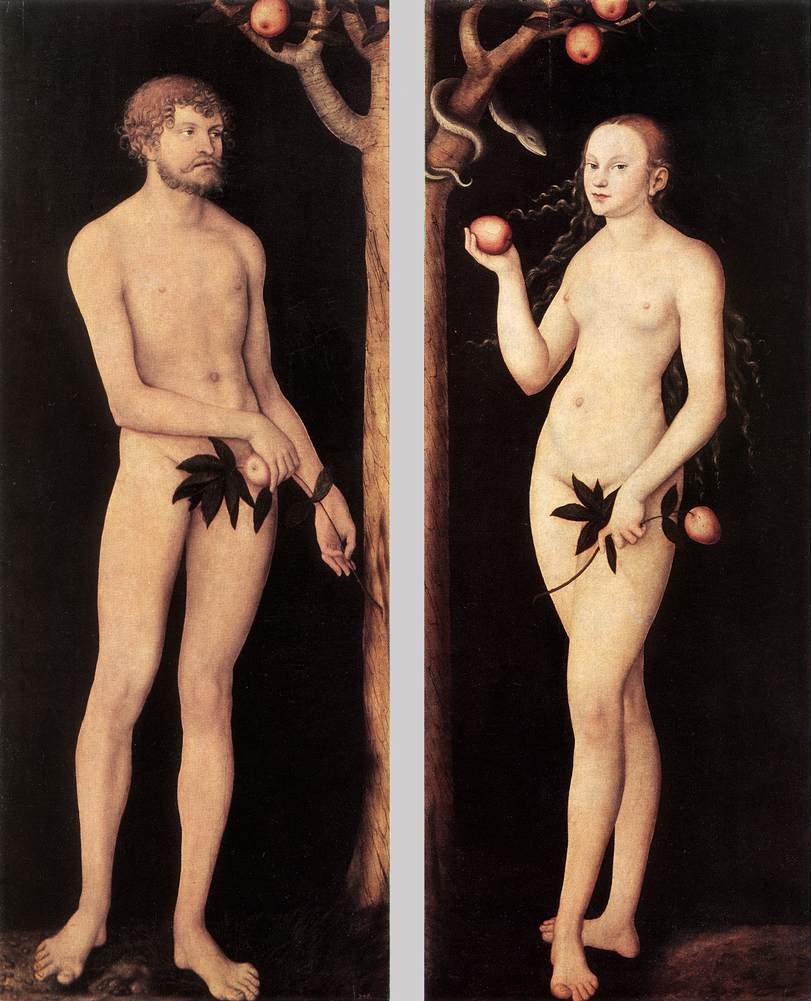
Staatliche Kunstsammlungen Dresden, Dresden, Germany 1531

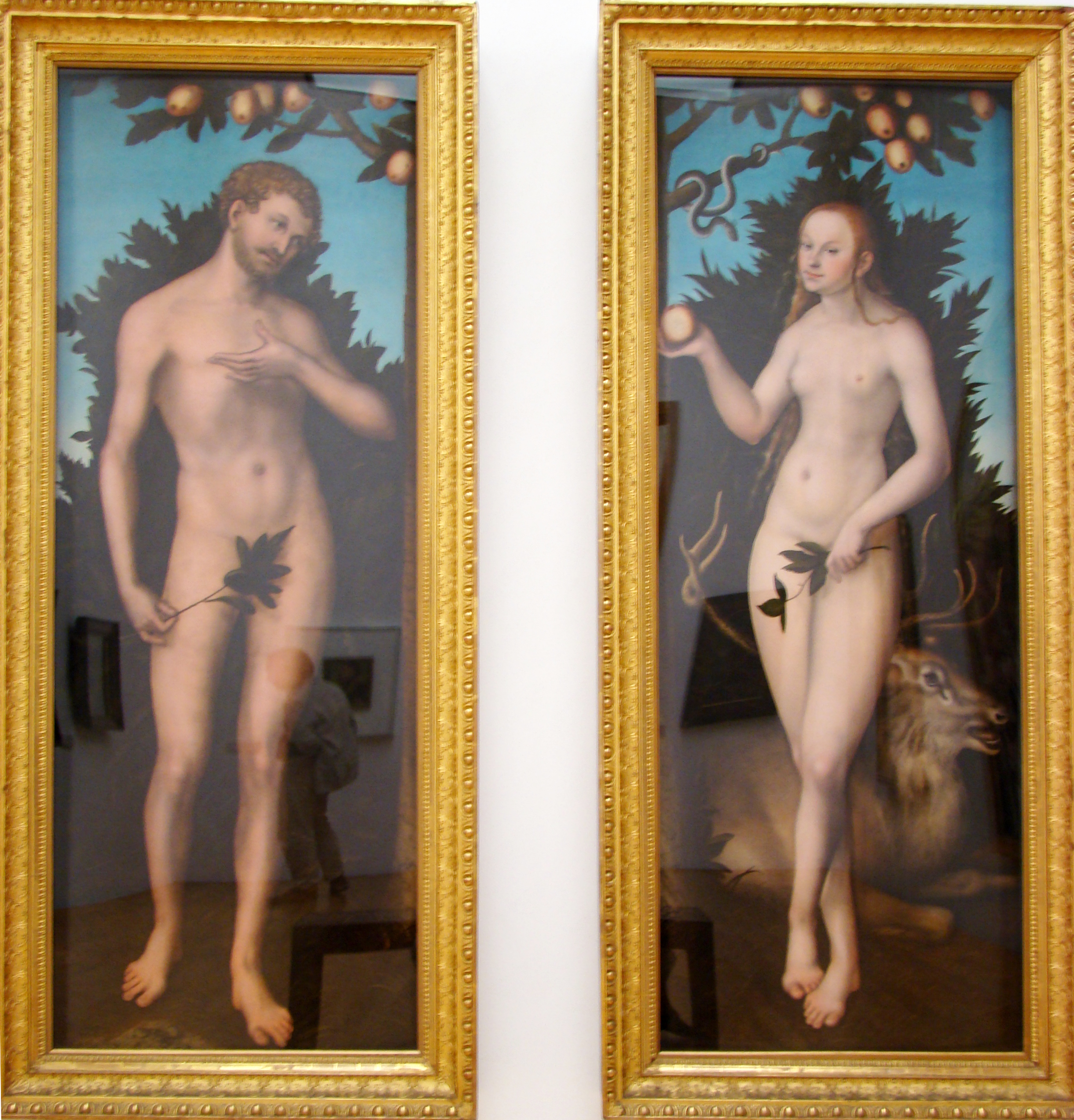
Museum der bildenden Künste, Leipzig, Germany 1533 (see Adam and Eve (Cranach, Leipzig))

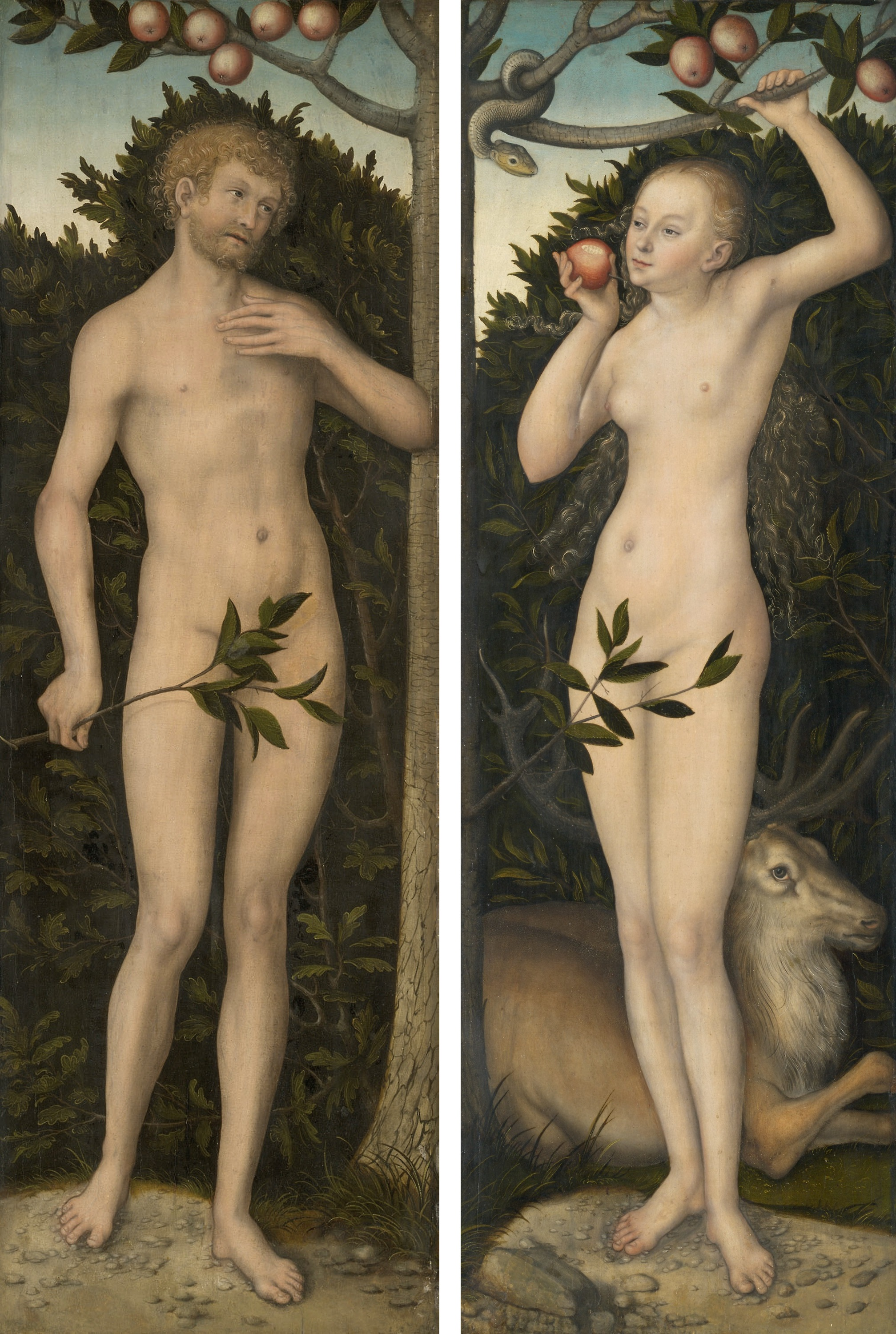
Art Institute of Chicago, U.S. c. 1533–37

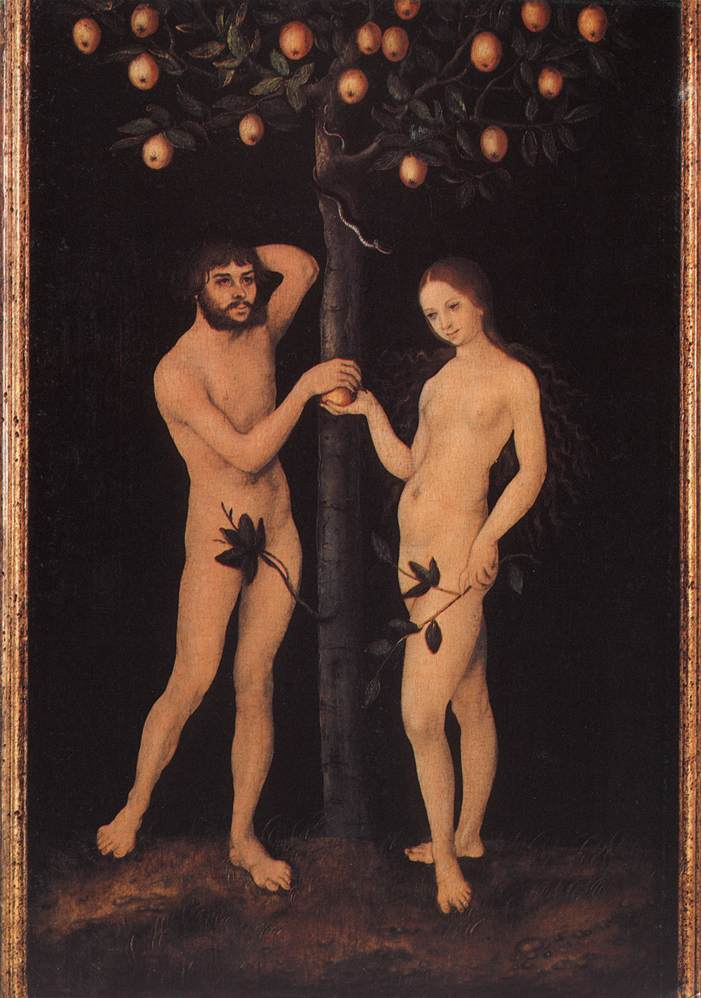
Royal Museum of Fine Arts Antwerp, Belgium 1500–1550

National Gallery Prague, Czechia c. 1538 (see Adam and Eve (Cranach, Prague))

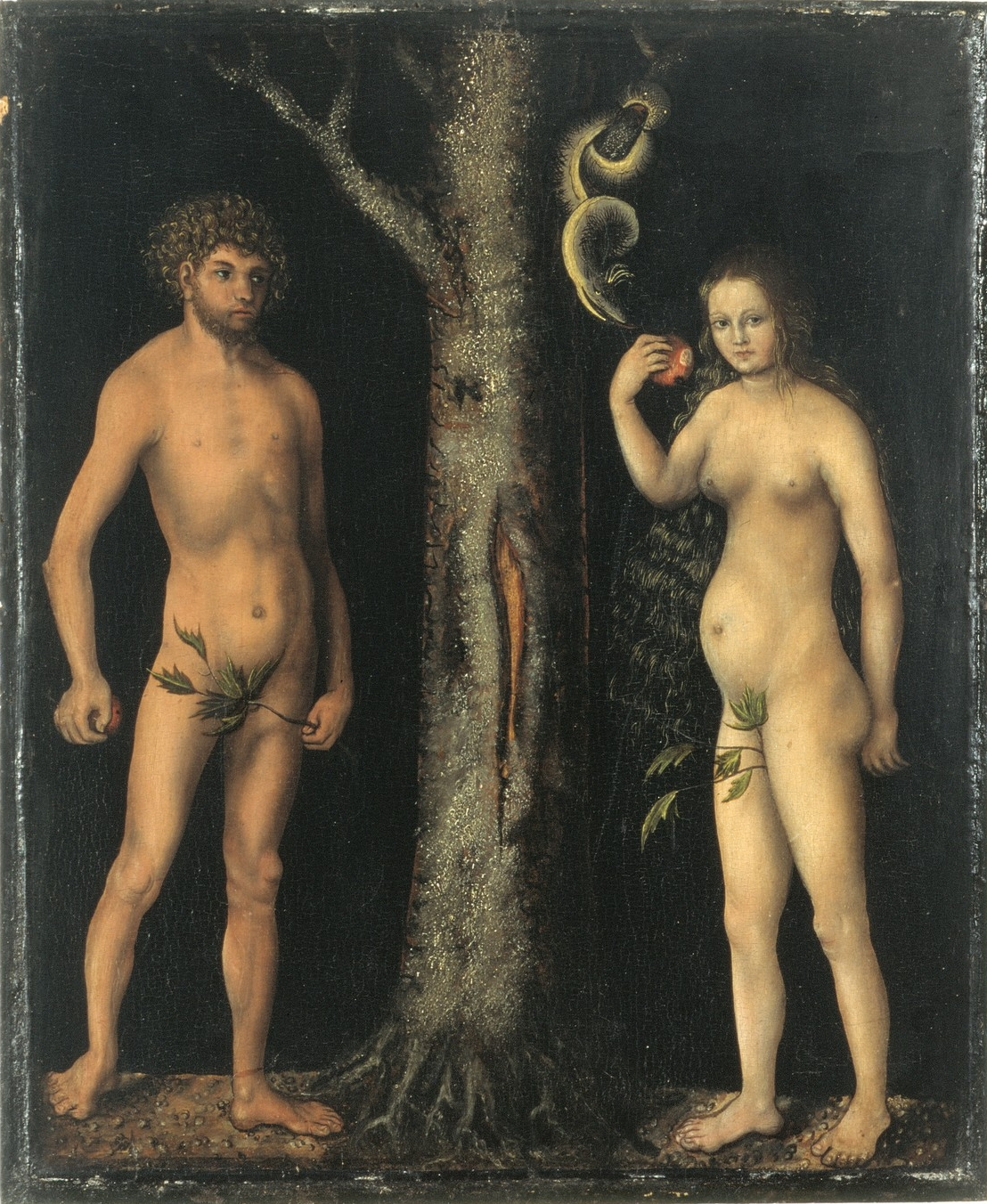
Veste Coburg, Germany, 1512

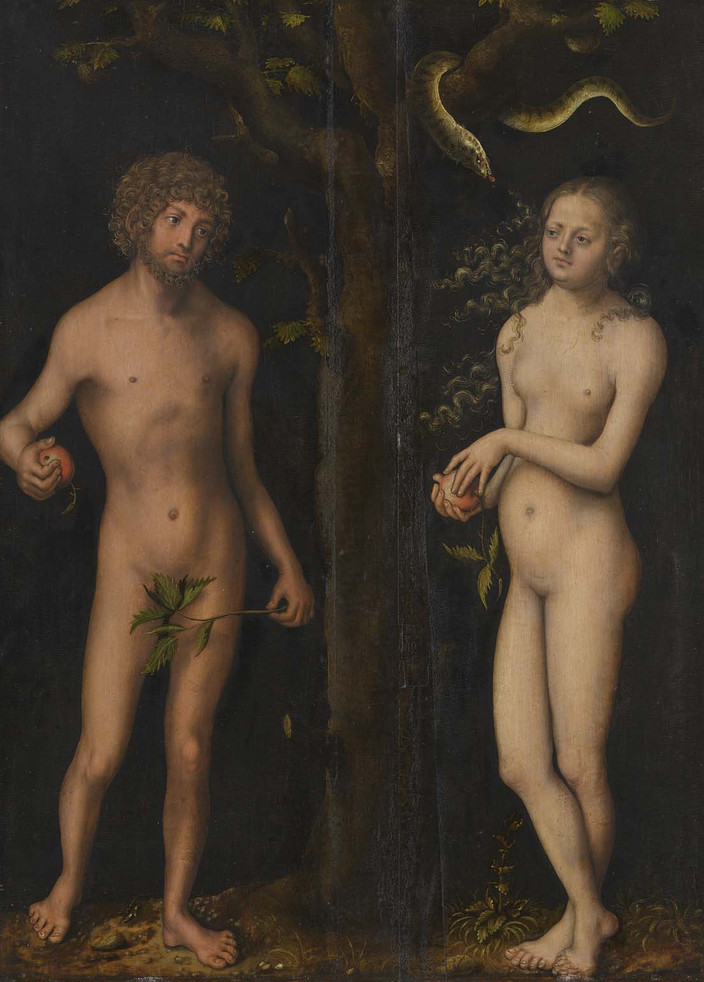
Alte Pinakothek, Munich, Germany 1510–16

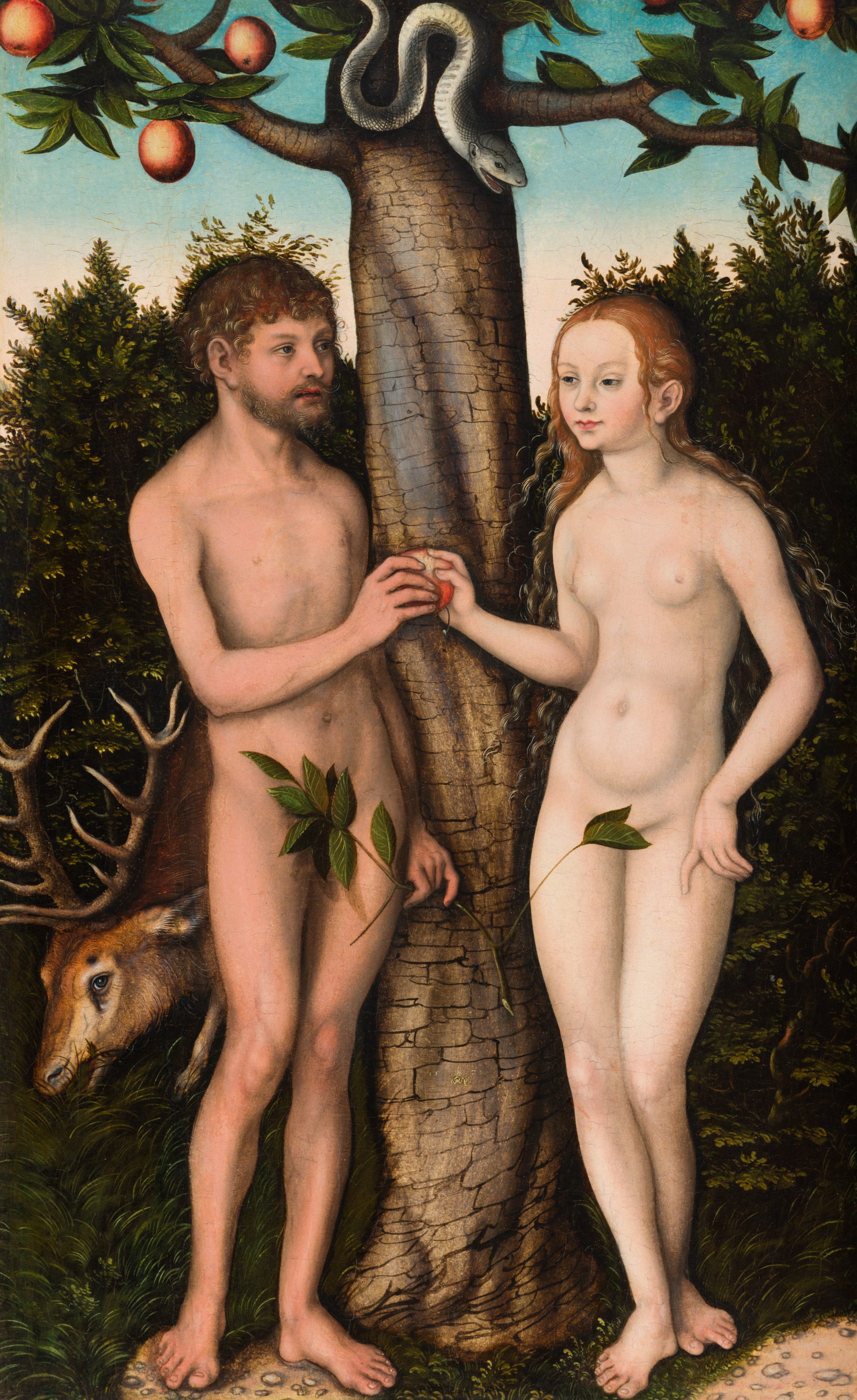
Detroit Institute of Arts, U.S. 1528

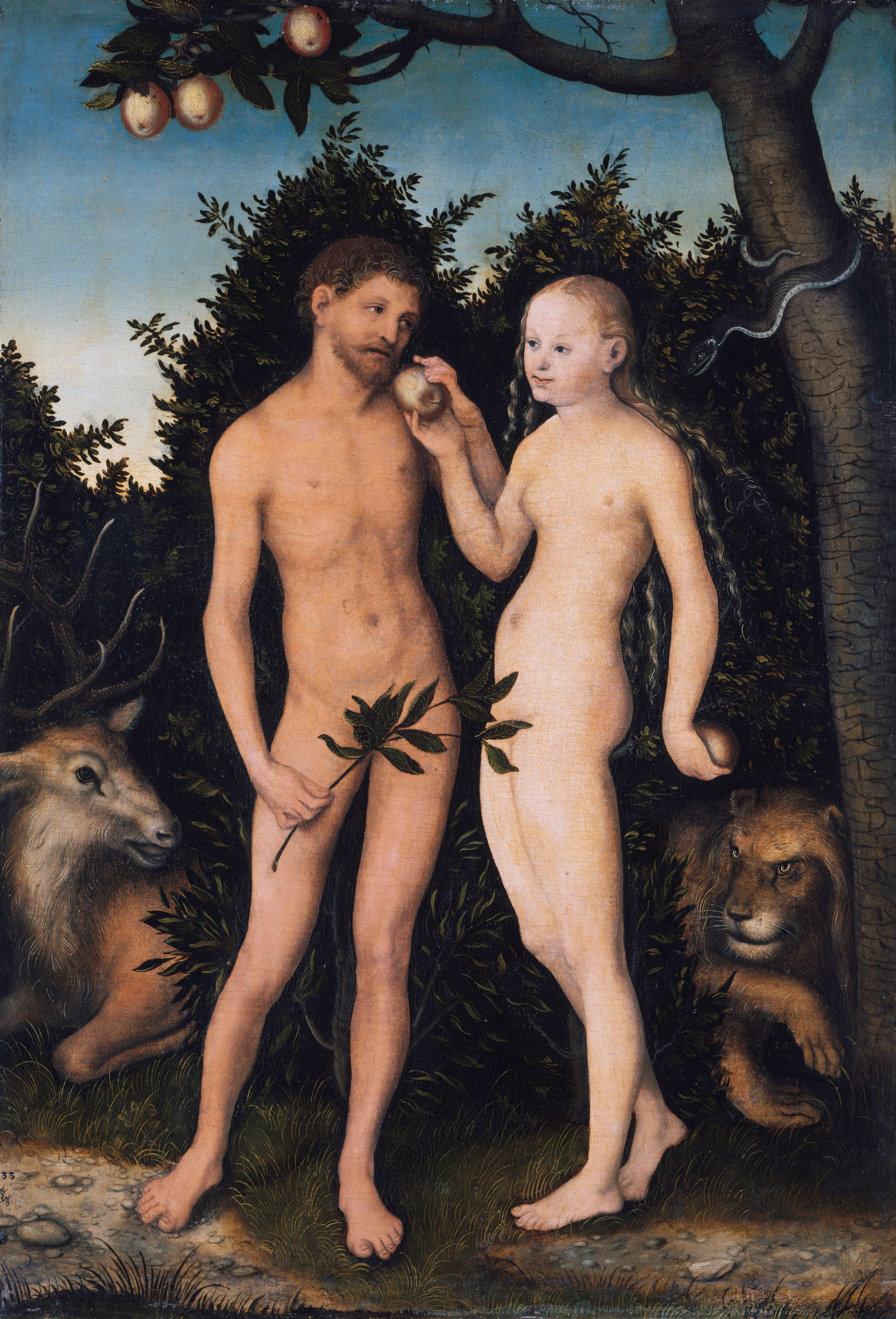
1533, Gemäldegalerie, Berlin, Germany, Google Art Project

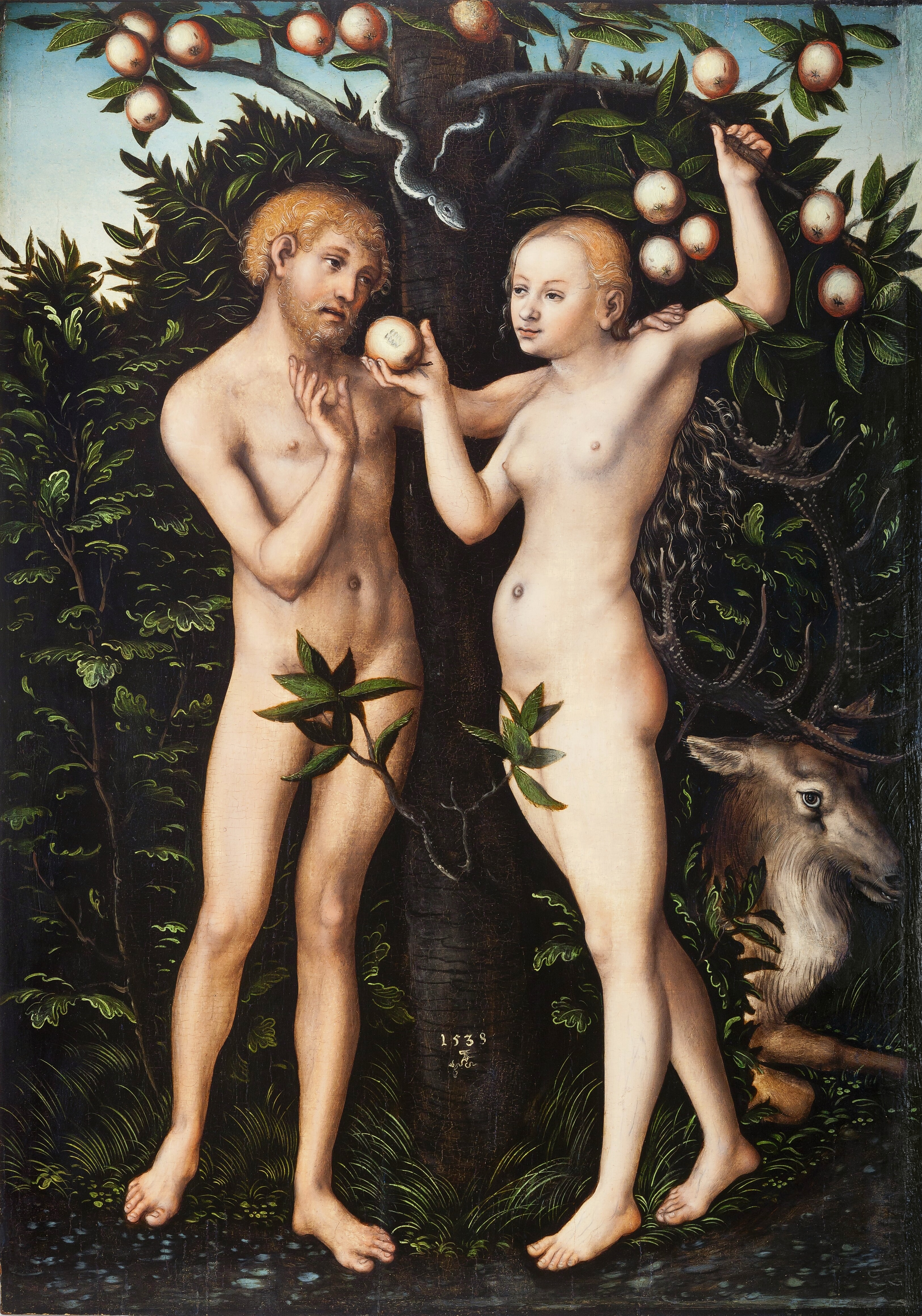
University of Toronto Malcove Collection, Canada 1538

== See also ==
- 100 Great Paintings, 1980 BBC series
