= Devil in the Flesh (1989 film) =

- Directed by: Scott Murray
- Written by: Scott Murray
- Based on: Le Diable au corps by Raymond Radiguet
- Starring: Keith Smith; Katia Caballero; Tim Lawrence; Jill Forster
- Release date: 16 February 1989
- Country: Australia
- Language: English
- Budget: A$1.6 million

Devil in the Flesh is an Australian film adapted from the French novel Le Diable au corps. It is directed by Scott Murray, who is best known for being the editor of Cinema Papers.

Murray adapted the film to be set in rural Victoria during World War II.

== Shooting and release ==
The film was shot over seven weeks in central Victoria in towns such as Bendigo, Castlemaine, and Dunolly, starting 1 May 1985. Its working title was Marie-Claire.

The film was screened at the 25th International Critics' Week of the 1986 Cannes Film Festival, but it didn't get a theatrical release till early 1989.
