= Bronia Clair =

French model

- Born: August 9, 1906
- Died: July 14, 2004 (aged 97)
- Spouse: René Clair
- Children: 1

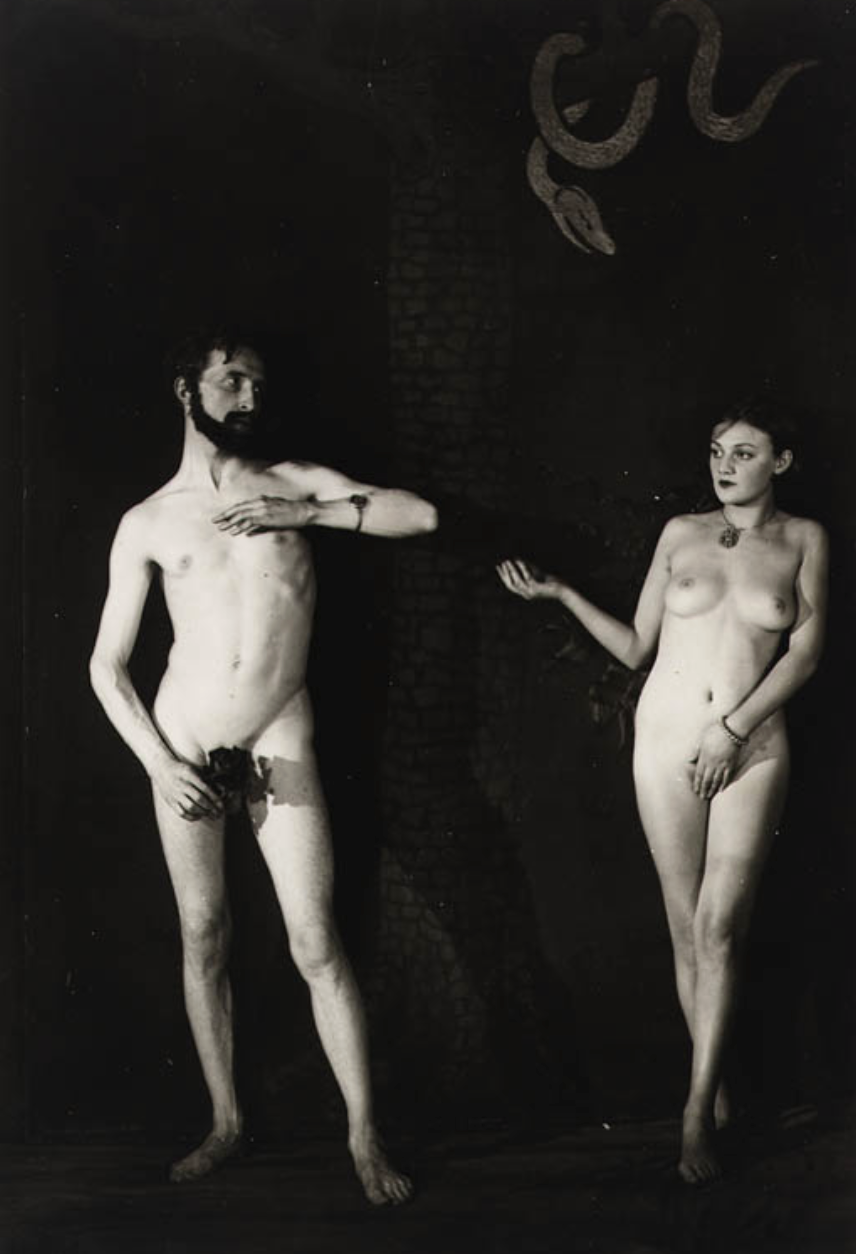
Clair, right, with Marcel Duchamp as Adam and Eve

Bronia Clair (née Perlmutter, August 9, 1906 – July 14, 2004) was a French model of Polish extraction. She was highly sought-after in the artistic scene of Montparnasse during the années folles.

== Life ==
Bronia Perlmutter was born into a Russo-Polish Jewish family from Brest-Litovsk who had gone to Holland to flee the pogroms after the Revolution of 1905. Her mother died when she was a small child, and her father, who lived by his wits, was mostly absent. In 1922, aged 15, Bronia moved in with her elder sister Tilia, in Paris. Tilia was an aspiring actress and Bronia wanted to ply her talents as a pianist. Already speaking Russian, Italian, Dutch, and English, she quickly learned French. Her beauty and artistic sensibility enabled her to make a living as a model; she posed for Kisling, Man Ray, Nils Dardel, Picabia, Berenice Abbott, and Per Krohg, among others. In spring 1923, she met the writer Raymond Radiguet at the Bal Bullier, and the two became romantically involved, and soon engaged. This drew the jealousy of Radiguet's mentor and lover Jean Cocteau. After Radiguet's untimely death in December 1923, she continued modeling, and in 1926 she married the filmmaker René Clair, a union which only ended with Clair's death in 1981. Clair had desired Bronia not to speak about her time as a model and in the Montparnasse demimonde, but after his death she gave several interviews, notably one with Pierre Barillet. She died in 2004, aged 97.

Perlmutter performed in Ciné-Sketch, a Dada skit-within-a-skit performed between acts of Picabia's ballet Relâche. Man Ray's photograph of this performance, showing Perlmutter standing nude with Marcel Duchamp in poses recalling Cranach's Adam and Eve, sold for $167,000 at Christie's in 1999.
