= Le Bal du comte d'Orgel (film) =

1970 film

- Directed by: Marc Allégret
- Written by: Marc Allégret; Françoise Sagan; Phillipe Grumbach; Raymond Radiguet (novel)
- Produced by: Phillipe Grumbach
- Starring: Jean-Claude Brialy
- Edited by: Victoria Mercanton
- Music by: Raymond Le Sénéchal
- Distributed by: Cocinor
- Release date: 1 July 1970
- Running time: 95 minutes
- Country: France
- Language: French

Le Bal du compte d'Orgel (English: The Ball of Count Orgel) is a French film from 1970. It was the last film directed by Marc Allégret, who was also the producer of this film. It was screened at the 1970 Cannes Film Festival, but was not entered into the main competition.

== Plot ==
Based on Raymond Radiguet's book of the same name, posthumously published in 1924, the film concerns a ball hosted by the Comte d'Orgel (English: Count of Orgel).

Set in 1920, the Comte hosts a soirée and dance for the upper echelons of Parisian society. One of the guests is a handsome young man named François de Séryeuse (played by Bruno Garcin), who during the course of the ball falls in love with the Comte's wife, Comtesse Mahé (played by Sylvie Fennec).

The Comtesse alerts her husband (the Comte), but he dismisses it, seeing de Séryeuse as childish and common. However, Mahé falls for François, and faints with passion on stage during a performance of The Tempest with François. Mahé continues to dream about him, however she is confined in her marriage.

== Cast ==
- Jean-Claude Brialy: Le comte Anne d'Orgel (English: Count Anne of Orgel)
- Sylvie Fennec: La comtesse Mahé d'Orgel (English: Countess Mahé of Orgel)
- Bruno Garcin: François de Seyrieuse
- Micheline Presle: Madame de Seyrieuse (English: Mrs. de Seyrieuse)
- Gérard Lartigau: Paul Robin
- Sacha Pitoëff: Le prince Naoumof (English: Prince Naoumof)
- Marpessa Dawn: Marie
- Claude Gensac: Mademoiselle d'Orgel (English: Orgel's daughter)
- Ginette Leclerc: Hortense d'Austerlitz (English: Hortense of Austerlitz)
- Aly Raffy: Mirza
- Marcel Charvey: L'ambassadeur (English: The Ambassador)
- Béatrice Chatelier: Amina
- Max Montavon: Un invité (English: A guest)
- Wendy Nicholls: Hester
