= Adam and Eve (Cranach, Prague) =

Painting by Lucas Cranach the Elder in the National Gallery in Prague

Adam and Eve is a c. 1538 oil on limewood painting by Lucas Cranach the Elder, acquired in 1949 from the Cistercian monastery in Osek near Duchcov, now in the National Gallery Prague.

It is part of a series of works showing the fall of man produced by that artist, including others now in Besançon (c. 1508–1510) and in Florence (1528). It is signed on the lower right on the tree trunk (winged snake with folded wings). Infrared reflectography of the image detected only the outline drawing.

== Description ==
It shows the figures of Adam and Eve next to the Tree of Knowledge. Eve holds onto a branch with her left hand and leans on the trunk with the sole of her bent right foot. With her knee she touches Adam and with her right hand she hands him an apple. Adam stands somewhat in the background in front of a thick bush. His left hand is resting on Eva's shoulder, and in his right hand he holds a twig that covers the private parts of both figures. In line with Reformation theology, the active role of Eve is emphasized, who tempts Adam to sin (everything bad is the fault of the woman - "Weibermacht"). The later version of Adam and Eve, created by the successor of Lucas Cranach the Elder, Anton Heusler, around 1550 (National Gallery Prague), changes the theme compositionally and depicts both characters completely naked.

== Other versions ==
The theme of Adam and Eve appears repeatedly in the work of Lucas Cranach the Elder from 1509. He depicted the two figures either separately on the altar wings (Adam and Eve, 1528, Uffizi Gallery, Florence) or together in a single panel. In Cranach's earlier depictions of the biblical story (1508–10, Besançon, 1510, Munich, 1512, Coburg), the two figures stand under the centrally placed Tree of Knowledge and do not touch. Later versions of Original Sin usually depict Adam and Eve in the Garden of Eden surrounded by beasts and attribute to Eve the role of temptress. One later composition by Lucas Cranach shows an active Adam embracing Eve and offering her an apple (1537, Kunsthistorisches Museum Vienna).

== Sources ==
- Kotková Olga, Cranach ze všech stran / from all sides, cat. 188 p., National Gallery in Prague 2016, ISBN 978-80-7035-618-0
- Jan Royt, Gothic panel painting in Northwestern and Northern Bohemia, 1340-1550, pp. 204–206, Karolinum Prague 2015, ISBN 9788024631745
- Kotková Olga, German and Austrian Painting of the 14th - 16th Century. National Gallery in Prague, pp. 34–35, Prague 2007, ISBN 978-80-7035-358-5
