= Le Gendarme incompris =

Le gendarme incompris The misunderstood Gendarme
- Original language: French
- Written by: Jean Cocteau and Raymond Radiguet
- Genre: Comédie bouffe

Premiere
- Date: 24 May 1921
- Place: Théâtre Michel (Paris)

Le Gendarme incompris (The misunderstood Gendarme) is a one-act play written in 1920 by Jean Cocteau and Raymond Radiguet and set to music by Francis Poulenc, his FP 20a.

The play features three characters: Commissaire Médor (Note: common name for a dog in French) played by Pierre Bertin), a gendarme named the Penultimate whose replicas are from a poem in the Divagations by Stéphane Mallarmé, and an old lady, the Marquise de Montonson.

It was played publicly only once, on 24 May 1921, in addition to the dress rehearsal the day before. Two more performances were scheduled for 25 and 26 May.

== Suite ==
Poulenc derived a suite for orchestra drawn from the incidental music, which was first performed in London on 11 July 1921, conducted by Ernest Ansermet).

The work comprises three movements for double bass, cello, violin, clarinet, trumpet and trombone:

1. Ouverture
2. Madrigal
3. Final

The duration is about six and a half minutes.
