= Chuffilly-Roche =

- Commune
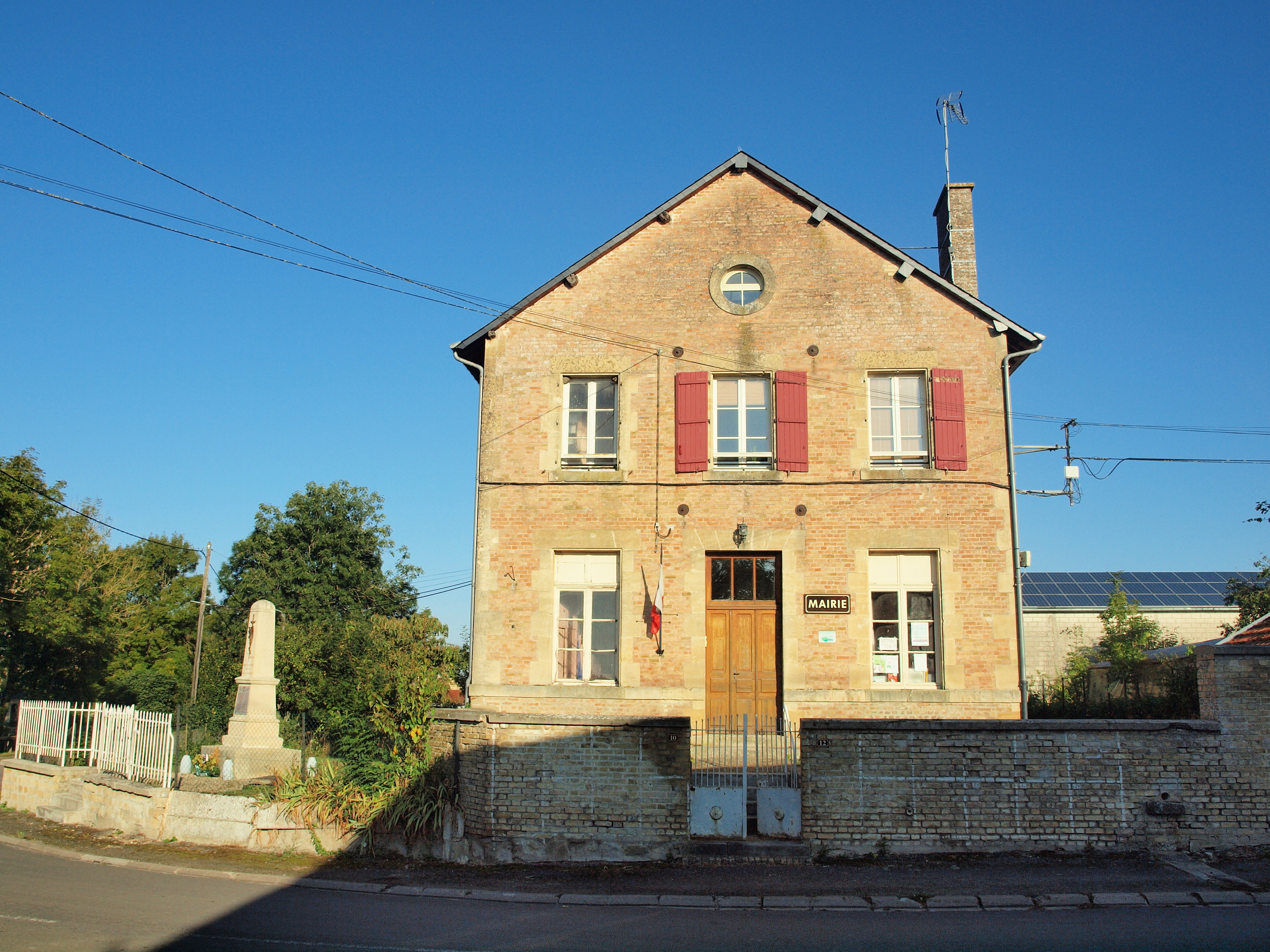
- The town hall in Chuffilly-Roche

- Coat of arms
- Location of Chuffilly-Roche
- Location within France Location within Grand Est
- Coordinates: 49°26′53″N 4°36′28″E
- Country: France
- Region: Grand Est
- Department: Ardennes
- Arrondissement: Vouziers
- Canton: Attigny
- Intercommunality: Crêtes Préardennaises

Government
  - Mayor (2020–2026): Guy Morlet
- Area^{1}: 7.67 km^{2} (2.96 sq mi)
- Elevation: 107 m (351 ft)
- Population (2023): 69
  - Density: 9.0/km^{2} (23/sq mi)
- Time zone: UTC+01:00 (CET)
  - Summer (DST): UTC+02:00 (CEST)
- INSEE/Postal code: 08123 /08130
- ^{1} French Land Register data, which excludes lakes, ponds, glaciers > 1 km^{2} (0.386 sq mi or 247 acres) and river estuaries.

Chuffilly-Roche is a commune in the Ardennes department in northern France. It was created, in 1828, by amalgamating the communes of Chuffilly-et-Coigny and Roche-et-Méry.

== Population ==
Historical population
Year	Pop.	±% p.a.
1968	126	—
1975	116	−1.17%
1982	84	−4.51%
1990	100	+2.20%
1999	91	−1.04%
2007	88	−0.42%
2012	88	+0.00%
2017	75	−3.15%
2023	69	−1.38%
Source: INSEE

== Personalities ==
Arthur Rimbaud, French poet, lived for a while in Roche, where his family had a farm. He wrote several works there, notably Une saison en enfer (A Season in Hell) and Le bateau ivre (The Drunken Boat).

== See also ==
- Communes of the Ardennes department
