= Adam and Eve (Cranach, Leipzig) =

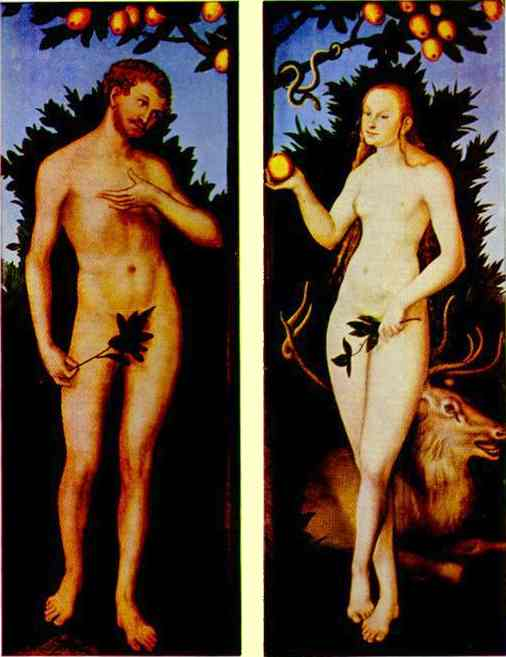

Adam and Eve is a 1533 oil on panel painting by Lucas Cranach the Elder, dated on the rock at the bottom by Adam. It is now in the Museum der bildenden Künste in Leipzig, to which it was donated by the Sternburg Foundation.

It is one of a series of about thirty paintings by that artist showing the fall of man. The Museum der bildenden Künste also has a 1512 version by Cranach from the same series.

== See also ==
- Adam and Eve (Cranach), other works on the subject by the same painter
