= Scott Murray (filmmaker) =

Australian filmmaker and writer

Scott Murray is an Australian filmmaker and writer, best known for his long association with Cinema Papers and making the film Devil in the Flesh (1989). He edited the book Australian film, 1978-1992: a survey of theatrical features. (1993).
