= Le Bal du comte d'Orgel =

1923 novel by Raymond Radiguet

Le Bal du comte d'Orgel ("Count d'Orgel's Ball") is a French novel by Raymond Radiguet (1903–1923). The second and last novel by the Parisian author, it was published posthumously in 1924. Set as a love triangle during the années folles, it proved controversial, as did his first psychological novel, Le Diable au corps, published in 1923. Le Bal du comte d'Orgel was adapted into a 1970 film.

== Plot ==
It is Paris, 1920. François de Séryeuse is a young student of feudal nobility. At first he meets diplomat Paul Robin, a friend of the Comte Ann d’Orgel at a performance by the Cirque Medrano. Here he meets Anne's wife, Countess Mahaut d'Orgel, and falls in love with her at first sight. Keeping this secret, and wishing to keep Anne friendly, he quickly inveigles himself into the d'Orgel household.

François introduces the d'Orgels to his mother, Madame de Séryeuse, with whom he has trouble communicating. Anne traces a distant common descent for François and Mahaut from Grimoard de la Verberie. This rather tenuous link surprises them both. Day by day, Anne's friendship and François' mother's encouragement draw François and Mahaut closer together. Mahaut, adoring her husband, does not notice the feelings François has for her.

They spend the summer holidays apart, each waiting for news from the other. Mahaut accepts her feelings for François, but not knowing what to do about them, she confides her love to Madme de Séryeuse, who slyly tells François. This encourages him to do what Mahaut dreaded: continue being friends with Anne, who in François' eyes is a fool. During an evening preparing for their ball, Mahaut confesses her feelings to her husband. He thinks it all a misunderstanding and does not take it seriously.

== Themes ==
- Roman où c'est la psychologie qui est romanesque
  A novel where psychology is the subject
  — Radiguet in Galichon-Brasart, Manuscript for Bal
- According to Jean Cocteau, Radiguet focuses on the psychology of his characters. In the vast majority of his writing, he explains what is going on in their minds, informing their decisions, commissions and omissions.
- Ces énoncés sentencieux, qui révèlent la présence triomphante de l'auteur, seul capable d'analyser les mécanismes psychologiques qui échappent aux personnages
  These sententious statements, revealing the omniscient presence of the author, show him to be the only one capable of analysing psychological mechanisms of which the characters themselves are unaware
  — Galichon-Basart
- In the first chapter, Radiguet gives the family tree of the main characters' families. He highlights their shared lineage with Grimoard de la Verberie (an addition to the novel) and Tascher de la Pagerie.
- The rare mention of the physical environment is set in the countryside around the river Marne, liked by both Séryeuse and Mahaut.
- The social environment is the bourgeoisie and Parisian nobility after World War I. The historical context is important. World War I and the Russian Revolution are touched upon almost at random. The characters live in postwar frivolity, thinking only of having a good time as much as possible.
- In balance, the character of Paul Robin embodies the maladroit arriviste, a failure in everything he does, heightening the contrast with François' spontaneity. According to Galichon-Brasat, "à travers ce personnage, Radiguet condamne la catégorie des calculateurs dont le modèle serait le Rastignac de Balzac". ("In this character, Radiguet condemns the model of the entrepreneur given by the character of Eugène de Rastignac in Honoré de Balzac").

== Publication ==
- The novel is known to have had several revisions, the first being of four hundred pages, before being sent to the printer. The final draft was published posthumously by Éditions Grasset, Radiguet having died of typhoid fever.
- The draft was reviewed and corrected by Jean Cocteau and Joseph Kessel. Cocteau helped Radiguet greatly with his editing, such that by the time it was published a critic could write: "C'est du très bon Cocteau" ("This is very good Cocteau"). Jacques-Émile Blanche had also started proofreading the book, just before his death.
- The book can be read at several levels. It can be a "chaste romance novel", but Cocteau indicates, in his preface to the 1924 edition, that "la convention et la bienséance, ici, couvrent la plus trouble et la plus licencieuse des chastetés" ("convention and propriety cover the most turbid and licentious kind of chastity"). Nadia Odouard, quoted by Galichon-Brasart for her psychoanalytical monograph on Radiguett's works, speculates that there is a homosexual dimension to the work, "rappel de la relation amoureuse Radiguet/Cocteau -, en étudiant notamment le curieux jeu onomastique, qui attribue au mari et à l'amant des noms féminins ou féminisés - «Séryeuse», «Anne» - et à la femme, inversement, un prénom - «Mahaut» - aux sonorités masculines" ("recall the relationship between Radiguet and Cocteau - including the strange onomastic game which gives the husband and lover feminine names - 'Seryeuse', 'Anne' - and the woman, conversely, a masculine-sounding first name, 'Mahaut'").
- Radiguet drew some inspiration from his own life – far less than in Le Diable au corps – and far more from the moralist literature of the 17th century. In particular, he does not disguise his references to La Princesse de Clèves by Madame de Lafayette.
- A film adaptation was produced by Marc Allégret in 1970, Le Bal du comte d'Orgel, with Jean-Claude Brialy in the part of Anne d'Orgel.
- The ruined Château de la Solitude at Plessis-Robinson and the Hôtel de Masseran inspired the description of the d'Orgel pile and its surroundings.

== Sources ==
- Galichon-Basart, Marion (1990). Radiguet, Raymond (ed.). "Commentaires sur le Bal du comte d'Orgel". Le Bal du comte d'Orgel (in French). Paris: Le Livre de Poche.
- Radiguet, Raymond (1990). Le Bal du comte d'Orgel (in French). Paris: Le Livre de Poche.
