= Cinema Papers =

Australian film magazine

- Cover of Issue No. 92 (April 1993) featuring Yahoo Serious in Reckless Kelly
- Editor: Michaela Boland
- Categories: Film
- Frequency: Bimonthly
- Publisher: Niche Media Pty Ltd
- Founder: Peter Beilby, Scott Murray, Philippe Mora
- Founded: 1974
- First issue: January 1974
- Final issue: February–March 2001
- Country: Australia
- Based in: Melbourne, Victoria
- Language: English
- ISSN: 0311-3639

Cinema Papers was an Australian bi-monthly film magazine which ran from 1974 to 2001, regarded as "the premier Australian film industry magazine". It absorbed Filmviews in 1989.

== History and profile ==
Cinema Papers was first published as a nationally distributed magazine in January 1974, established by Peter Beilby, Scott Murray, and Philippe Mora.

The name was derived, via a single issue magazine produced by students at La Trobe University in October 1967, from the influential French journal Cahiers du Cinéma. The La Trobe film society magazine was edited by Mora and Beilby, and from October 1969 until April 1970, another magazine, in the form of an 11-issue tabloid, was published by Mora.

The magazine was published on a bimonthly or quarterly basis, and had its headquarters in Melbourne, at 143 Thierry Street. One of the owners was MTV Publishing Ltd, and it had financial assistance from the Film, Radio and Television Board of the Australia Council for the Arts as of 1976. Subscription then cost A$7.60 per year.

In 1989 Cinema Papers absorbed another film magazine, Filmviews, but declining sales saw the magazine end in 1999.

Issue 131 was not published, but it was relaunched with issue 132 by Niche Media in St. Kilda in April 2000 with Michaela Boland as its editor. However, this ultimately proved unsuccessful and the magazine shut for good in 2001.

Contributing writers and editors included Antony I. Ginnane.

== Coverage ==
The magazine covered both national and international news, including film productions; interviews with actors, producers and technicians; historical articles; and film reviews of contemporary films from around the world.

== Influence and legacy ==
Cinema Papers was regarded as "the premier Australian film industry magazine".

Digitised versions of Cinema Papers are available from the University of Wollongong's archival collection.
