= Devil in the Flesh (1947 film) =

1947 French film by Claude Autant-Lara

- Theatrical release poster
- French: Le diable au corps
- Directed by: Claude Autant-Lara
- Screenplay by: Jean Aurenche; Pierre Bost
- Based on: Devil in the Flesh by Raymond Radiguet
- Produced by: Paul Graetz
- Starring: Micheline Presle; Gérard Philipe; Palau; Jean Varas; Jacques Tati; Denise Grey; Jean Debucourt
- Cinematography: Michel Kelber
- Edited by: Madeleine Gug
- Music by: René Cloërec
- Production company: Transcontinental Films
- Distributed by: Universal-Film S.A.
- Release dates: 15 June 1947 (Festival Mondial du Film et des Beaux-Arts de Bruxelles); 12 September 1947 (France)
- Running time: 125 minutes
- Country: France
- Language: French
- Budget: 4,762,930 admissions (France)

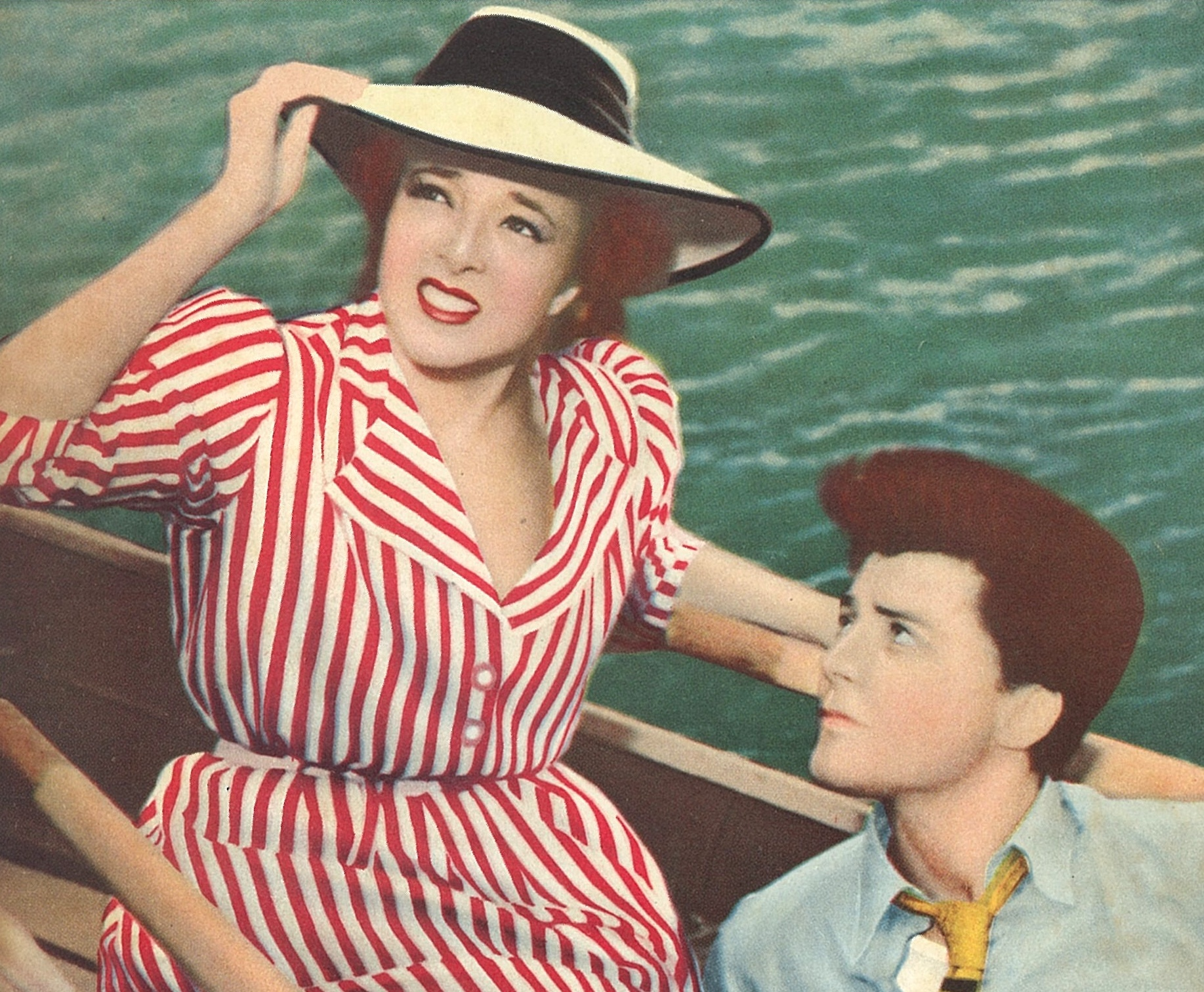
Micheline Presle and Gérard Philipe in Devil in the Flesh

Devil in the Flesh (French: Le diable au corps) is a 1947 French romantic drama film directed by Claude Autant-Lara, based on the 1923 novel of the same name by Raymond Radiguet. The film stars Micheline Presle and Gérard Philipe, with Palau, Jean Varas, Jacques Tati, Denise Grey and Jean Debucourt in supporting roles.

It was shot at the Boulogne Studios and Neuilly Studios and on location at a number of places around the city. The film's sets were designed by the art director Max Douy.

== Premise ==
In France during World War I, nurse Marthe waits for her husband, Jacques, while he fights on the front lines. The lonely Marthe begins a tempestuous affair with 17-year-old François, with whom she had a dalliance before marrying Jacques. Jealous François struggles with the fact that Marthe is married, while she tries to prove her devotion to her young, hotheaded lover. Things become even more complex when Marthe becomes pregnant with François's baby.

== Cast ==
- Micheline Presle as Marthe Grangier
- Gérard Philipe as François Jaubert
- Denise Grey as Madame Grangier
- Jean Debucourt as Monsieur Jaubert
- Palau as Monsieur Marin
- Jean Varas as Jacques Lacombe
- Michel François as Rene
- Richard Francoeur as the receptionist
- Max Maxudian as the principal
- Germaine Ledoyen as Madame Jaubert
- Jeanne Pérez as Madame Marin
- Jacques Tati as officer

== Accolades ==
In the United States the National Board of Review of Motion Pictures named it the fifth best film of 1949.
