= Devil in the Flesh (1986 film) =

1986 Italian film by Marco Bellocchio

- English-language theatrical poster
- Directed by: Marco Bellocchio
- Screenplay by: Marco Bellocchio; Ennio De Concini; Enrico Palandri
- Based on: Le Diable au corps by Raymond Radiguet
- Produced by: Leo Pescarolo
- Starring: Maruschka Detmers; Federico Pitzalis
- Cinematography: Giuseppe Lanci
- Edited by: Mirco Garrone
- Music by: Carlo Crivelli
- Distributed by: Istituto Luce
- Release date: 22 April 1986
- Running time: 114 min
- Country: Italy
- Language: Italian

Devil in the Flesh (Italian: Il diavolo in corpo) is an Italian film released in 1986 and directed by Marco Bellocchio.

An adaptation of Raymond Radiguet’s novel Le Diable au corps, the film stars Federico Pitzalis as a high school student who falls in love with an older woman (played by Maruschka Detmers).

== Storyline ==
An Italian high school student named Andrea becomes infatuated with Giulia, an older woman he sees outside his classroom window. Giulia's fiancé, a leftist radical, has been jailed and is currently on trial for political crimes. Andrea and Giulia meet and begin a sexual relationship, rendezvousing in her apartment. The situation becomes complicated when her fiancé's mother finds out about this and confronts Andrea's father, a psychiatrist and psychoanalyst who has treated Giulia in the past. The psychiatrist finds himself the target of Giulia's sexual advances, which he attributes to madness. As a passionate affair unfolds between Giulia and Andrea, the viewer is left wondering exactly how mentally unbalanced Giulia really is, and whether she had an affair with the boy's father as well. Intensity of passion between Giulia and Andrea builds towards a climax. Andrea's father confronts him about the affair, but Andrea does not back down. Giulia's husband is released from jail. The final ten minutes present a fitting conclusion to all the confusion and passion built up craftily in the film.

== Production ==
One of the more notable aspects of the film is an extended (though darkly lit) scene in which the character played by Maruschka Detmers performs unsimulated fellatio on the character played by Federico Pitzalis.

The oral sex scene between Maruschka Detmers and Federico Pitzalis was not part of the script. It was Massimo Fagioli, Marco Bellocchio's collaborator, who suggested it."
