= Adam and Eve (Cranach, Florence) =

1528 paintings by Lucas Cranach the Elder

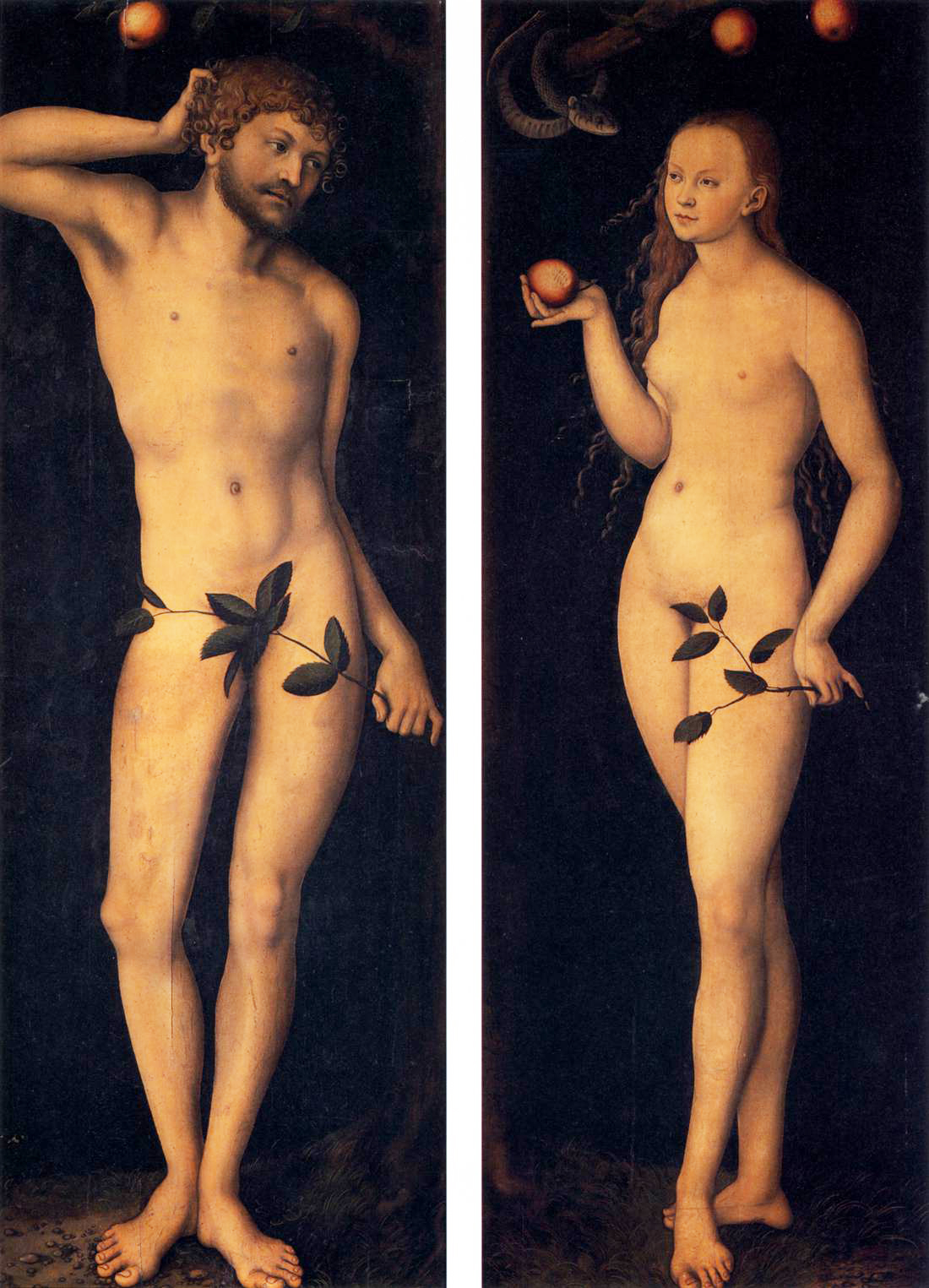
- Artist: Lucas Cranach the Elder
- Year: 1528
- Medium: Oil on panel
- Dimensions: 172 cm × 124 cm (68 in × 49 in)
- Location: Uffizi, Florence

Adam and Eve is a pair of paintings by German Renaissance master Lucas Cranach the Elder, dating from 1528, housed in the Uffizi, Florence, Italy.

The two biblical ancestors are portrayed, in two different panels, on a dark background, standing on a barely visible ground. Both hold two small branches which cover their sexual organs. Eve holds the traditional apple, with the serpent coming to her from above from the tree of the knowledge of good and evil. Adam is shown scratching the right crown part of his scalp.

== History ==
The work was part of the Tuscan Grand Dukes' collections since as early as 1688, and has been included in the Uffizi since the beginning of the 18th century. Filippo Baldinucci attributed it to Albrecht Dürer, until the inventory of 1784 assigned it to Cranach.

The subject continues Dürer's anatomy studies, which had culminated in his large Adam and Eve panels now in the Museo del Prado. These were the first full-size nudes painted by a German artist. During his stay in Vienna, Cranach had frequented some groups of humanists who were close to Dürer, and from there he was inspired to do a first, smaller version of the theme of Adam and Eve in 1510, currently housed at the National Museum in Warsaw.

== See also ==
- Adam and Eve (Cranach), other works on the subject by the same painter

== Sources ==
- Zuffi, Stefano (2005). Il Cinquecento. Milan: Electa. ISBN 88-370-3468-7.
