= Le Diable au corps (novel) =

Novel by Raymond Radiguet

Le Diable au corps (The Devil in the Flesh) is an early 1923 novel by Parisian literary prodigy Raymond Radiguet. In the immediate aftermath of World War I, the story of a young married woman who has an affair with a sixteen-year-old boy while her husband is away fighting at the front provoked a scandal. Though Radiguet denied it, it was established later that the story was in large part autobiographical. Critics, who initially despised the intense publicity campaign for the book's release (something not normally associated with works of literary merit at the time), were finally won over by the quality of Radiguet's writing and his sober, objective style.

It has been adapted several times for television and the screen.

== See also ==
- Devil in the Flesh (1947 film)
- Devil in the Flesh (1986 film)
- Devil in the Flesh (1989 film)
