= Raymond Radiguet =

French novelist and poet (1903–1923)

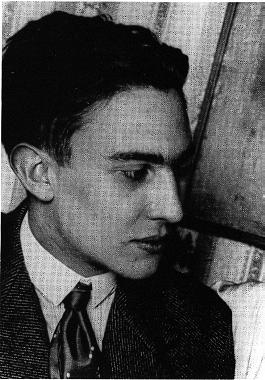
- Radiguet in 1922.
- Born: 18 June 1903; Saint-Maur, France
- Died: 12 December 1923 (aged 20); Paris, France
- Burial place: Père Lachaise Cemetery
- Occupations: Novelist, poet
- Known for: Le Diable au corps Le bal du Comte d'Orgel; Relationship with Jean Cocteau

Raymond Radiguet (French: [ʁɛmɔ̃ ʁadiɡɛ]; 18 June 1903 – 12 December 1923) was a French novelist and poet. His two novels are notable for their psychological complexity and classical aesthetics, as well as for their controversial subject matter. Radiguet died unexpectedly at the age of twenty after contracting typhoid fever.

Radiguet completed his best-known novel, Le Diable au corps (1923), at the age of seventeen. A succès de scandale upon its publication, the novel is a semi-autobiographical account of an adolescent boy's affair with the wife of a soldier during World War I. A second novel, Le Bal du comte d'Orgel (1924), was published posthumously.

Radiguet associated with many of the important artists of his time, including composers such as Erik Satie and Georges Auric, painters such as Modigliani and Picasso, and writers such as Max Jacob. Most notable among these connections was his intense, likely romantic relationship with Jean Cocteau.

== Early life ==
Raymond Maurice Radiguet was born in Saint-Maur-des-Fossés, Val-de-Marne, close to Paris. He was the eldest of the seven surviving children born to Maurice Radiguet (1866-1941), a successful caricaturist, and Marie Radiguet (née Tournier, 1884-1958), who taught at a boarding school. When asked about his mother, Radiguet once said, "Je ne sais pas. Je ne vois jamais son visage. Elle est toujours baissée, en train de relacer les souliers d'un de mes frères et sœurs." [transl. "I don't know. I never see her face. She's always down on her knees tying the shoes of one of my brothers or sisters."] His father was a much more significant presence in his life, and Maurice Radiguet's mixture of permissiveness and near-rivalry with his eldest son heavily influenced the paternal dynamic in Le Diable au corps. Radiguet was also close with his paternal aunt, Eugénie Cordonnier, who provided a steady and sensible presence in the life of the family.

On his mother's side, his family hailed from Martinique; his maternal grandfather had died in a shipwreck off the coast of Havana. Radiguet's lifelong fascination with the French West Indies influenced his characterization of Count d'Orgel's Creole wife, Mahaut, in Le Bal du comte d'Orgel. It has been further suggested that his mother's fear of water, stemming from her father's death, was at the origin of Radiguet's poetic preoccupation with the ocean. Cocteau claimed that Marie Radiguet's origins explained the temperament of her son, who "dort le jour, fume et aime le sucre." [transl. "sleeps during the day, smokes and loves sugar."]

Radiguet's paternal relatives were mainly involved in the sciences. His great-grandfather had founded Radiguet & Fils, a company that manufactured precision scientific instruments. The management of this firm stayed in the family for several generations. A notable relative was Arthur Radiguet (1850-1905), head of Radiguet & Fils and innovator in the field of radiography, who died of radiodermatitis in one of the first such cases observed in France.

Radiguet recounted his earliest memory in the autobiographical Île de France, Île d'Amour:

Je me vois à deux ans mené par ma nourrice tous les matins dans la pension de jeunes filles, d'où ma mère était sortie quatre ans auparavant. La douce tiédeur des genoux, des seins, je ne l'ai jamais retrouvée depuis, comme à ce moment où ces caresses, je les sentais si différentes de celles de ma mère ou de ma nourrice.

[I see myself at two years old, led by my nurse every morning to the girls' boarding school from which my mother had graduated four years earlier. The gentle warmth of knees, of breasts, I have never been able to recover it since, as at that moment when I felt that those caresses were so different from those of my mother or my nurse.]

In the same work, he sets down two childhood memories of death. In one, also drawn on at the beginning of Le Diable au corps, a neighbor's maid commits suicide by throwing herself from a rooftop. In the other, a moment of erotic fascination gives way to horror as, watching a young couple on a swing, he sees the woman fall and break her neck. He later wrote of this incident: "Image digne de la tragédie grecque." (transl. "Image worthy of Greek tragedy").

At six years old, Radiguet was enrolled in the municipal school of Saint-Maur, where he proved an excellent student, and where his brother Paul joined him three years later. In 1917, he entered the Lycée Charlemagne on a scholarship. Once there, however, he began neglecting his schoolwork in order to pursue his own interests in classic literature and was eventually expelled. He decided at that point to make a name for himself as a journalist. His father, concerned about his academic indifference, had him enrolled in classes in Latin and Greek, but Radiguet was more interested in the grand siècle (La Princesse de Clèves was especially formative for him) and he neglected these as well. At this time, as Radiguet tells it, he spent significant amounts of time reading on the shores of the Marne, lying moored in his father's boat. The Marne features prominently in his poetry.

== Career ==
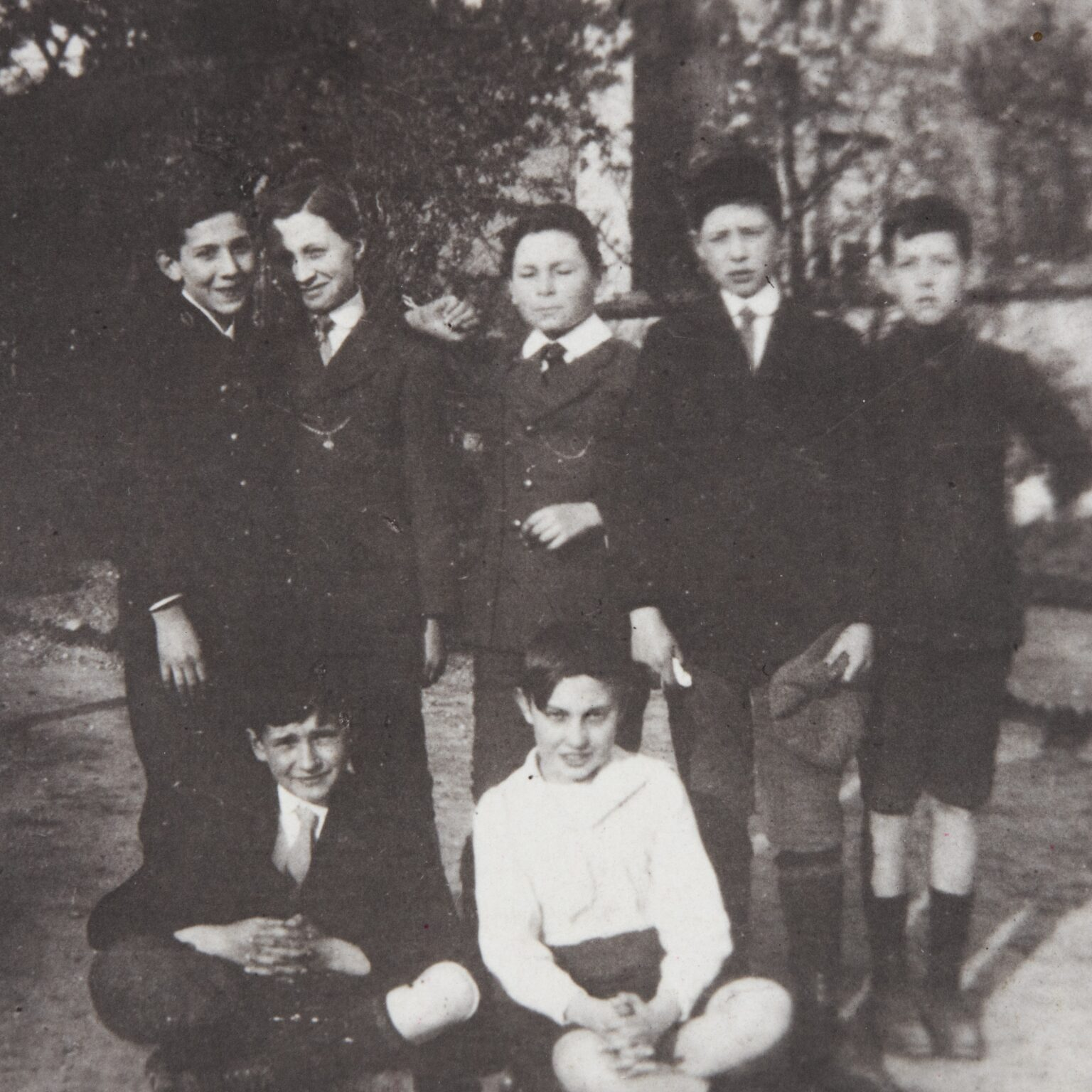
Raymond Radiguet (bottom right) in 1911 or 1912, at 8-9 years old.

Radiguet found his first literary connection in André Salmon, editor of L'Intransigeant, to whom he brought several caricatures signed "Rajky." Some of his biographers have concluded, from his poor grades in art and the crudeness of his surviving drawings, that these caricatures were likely his father's work. Salmon helped him find work at several newspapers; years later, recalling his impressions on first reading Radiguet's poetry, he writes: "Pas question d'un nouveau Rimbaud. Tout de même, devant soi, un garçon de quinze ans, déjà fort d'une indiscutable conscience poétique." [transl. "No question of a new Rimbaud. All the same, standing before one, a boy of fifteen already endowed with an indisputable poetic consciousness."] Radiguet's first published poem, again under the pseudonym "Raimon Rajky," was "Aiguilles des secondes," which appeared in the September 1918 edition of L'Instant. His first publication under his real name was "Ligne d'horizon," which appeared two months later, in Le Canard enchaîné. In December, he published a short story "Tohu" in the avant-garde journal SIC. In February 1919, he met Max Jacob, with whom he became close at this time. Some contemporaries speculated about the nature of this relationship, with Salmon writing that after only two days Radiguet was addressing Jacob using the familiar tu pronoun.

An early poem published under the pseudonym "Raimon Rajky." The reference to "un édredon rouge" offended Guillaume Apollinaire.

As one of the few writers in the immediate postwar milieu who had been too young to fight, Radiguet found himself an outsider in the generational struggle between modernists who were firmly established prior to World War I—Jacob and Salmon, along with SIC and its editor Pierre Albert-Birot, were among these—and the younger generation, most of whom had fought in the war and many of whom were still mobilized. This younger generation found a voice in Pierre Reverdy's magazine Nord-Sud, and then in Dada. Radiguet made an attempt to ingratiate himself with this new avant-garde without alienating his older connections. This was partly successful (Radiguet is hailed as one of the "Parisian friends" [amis parisiens] of Dada in a poem by Tristan Tzara), but social miscalculations and a poor impression on Louis Aragon damaged these inroads. An example of such a miscalculation was a poem Radiguet sent to Guillaume Apollinaire, which alluded through its incipit "un édredon rouge..." [transl. "a red quilt..."] to a line of Apollinaire's "Zone": "Une famille transporte un édredon rouge comme vous transportez votre cœur." [transl. "A family transports a red quilt as you transport your heart."] This gesture offended Apollinaire rather than endearing Radiguet to him.

Radiguet's relationship with Jean Cocteau began in 1919. Despite Cocteau's characteristically dramatic account of their first meeting, it is uncertain at which literary soirée they first made personal contact. On Radiguet's first being introduced at Cocteau's home, the butler announced him this way: "Monsieur, c'est un enfant avec une canne." [transl. "Sir, it's a child with a cane."] The nature of their relationship has been the source of much speculation. Cocteau was famously homosexual, and Radiguet was only the most significant in a series of eroticized mentor-mentee relationships in Cocteau's life. While there is no positive evidence that the two were ever romantically or sexually involved, Radiguet's biographer Monique Nemer concludes that: il est quand même bien difficile de douter de la réalité amoureuse, et sexuelle, des rapports de Jean Cocteau et Raymond Radiguet. [transl. "it is in any case quite difficult to doubt the amorous—and sexual—reality of the relations between Jean Cocteau and Raymond Radiguet."] Cocteau was possessive toward his protégé: during a long absence from Paris, he dispatched friends like Georges Auric to watch over Radiguet and keep him from "les miasmes des monts Martre et Parnasse." [transl. "the miasma of monts Martre and Parnasse."] Cocteau's correspondence with Radiguet during this period, entailing letters sent almost daily despite the infrequency of Radiguet's responses, resulted in Maurice Radiguet demanding explanations from Cocteau.

In 1920, Radiguet and Cocteau collaborated several times, notably on the one-act play Le Gendarme incompris and on the libretto for Paul et Virginie, a comic opera adaptation of Bernardin de Saint-Pierre's novel; Erik Satie composed the music. They also co-founded a literary review called Le Coq, which became defunct eight months later after four issues containing works by artists and writers such as Paul Morand, Roger de La Fresnaye, Georges Auric and Tristan Tzara. Radiguet inserted into the first issue an article captioned: Depuis 1789 on me force à penser. J'en ai mal à la tête [transl. Since 1789 they force me to think. It makes my head hurt]. This article denounces French artists' self-conscious innovation and search for novelty, which he represents as part of the legacy of Voltaire, and declares that Ronsard and Racine, qu'on accusera d'héllenisme tant qu'ils vivront, sont purement français. [transl. "who will be accused of Hellenism as long as they live, are purely French"]. He praises La Fresnaye and Auric for not spurning familiar subjects, and applies to both of them what he says in the article of Cocteau: Il y a en lui assez de nouvauté pour qu'il puisse se permettre de respirer une rose. [transl. "There is enough novelty in him that he can afford to smell a rose"].

In early 1923, Radiguet published his first and most famous novel, Le Diable au corps [The Devil in the Flesh]. Its scandalous content, along with its autobiographical links, set off a literary cause célèbre. The novel was a great commercial success. Due in part to an intense marketing campaign by its publisher, Bernard Grasset of Éditions Grasset, it sold over 100,000 copies in three months. The moral outcry against the novel was spearheaded by FIDAC. The novel tells the story of a young married woman who has an affair with an adolescent boy while her husband is away fighting at the front. Its plot, along with its narrator's cynical treatment of the war as "four years of summer vacation," tapped into an unacknowledged but profound national anxiety over the fidelity of soldiers' wives, some of whom had staved off loneliness through affairs with older men or adolescent boys. According to Radiguet family friend Yves Krier, it was Maurice Radiguet that Alice Serrier (née Saunier), the model for the character of Marthe, initially intended to seduce. Alice Serrier's husband, Gaston Serrier, was a soldier in the war. The scandal followed the couple for decades, and the paternity of their child was called into question by the press. Gaston always maintained his wife's fidelity.

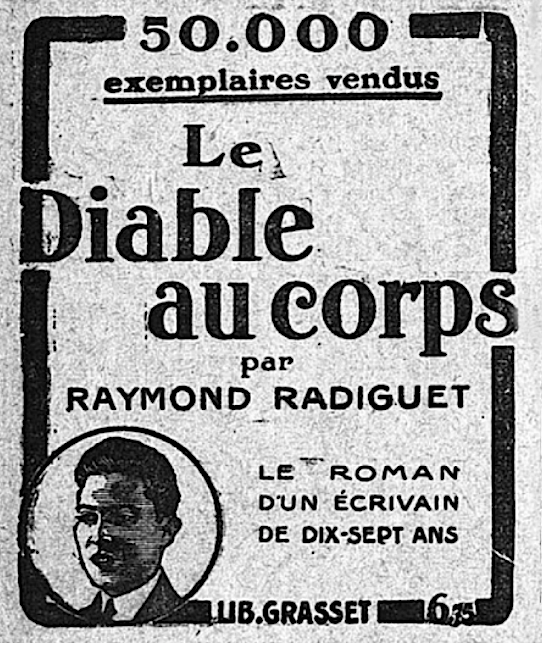
Advertisement by Grasset for Le Diable au corps: "The novel of a seventeen-year-old writer."

During the last months of his life, Radiguet was engaged to model Bronia Perlmutter (1906-2004), who later married filmmaker René Clair. An anecdote reported by Ernest Hemingway has Cocteau charging Radiguet (known in the Parisian literary circles as "Monsieur Bébé" – Mister Baby) with decadence for this behavior, applying the feminine form of the adjective vicieux to Radiguet: "Bébé est vicieuse. Il aime les femmes." [transl. "Baby is depraved. He likes women."] Radiguet, Hemingway implied, employed his sexuality to advance his career: being a writer "who knew how to make his career not only with his pen but with his pencil."

By the age of 20, Radiguet was drinking extremely heavily and working on his second novel, Le bal du Comte d'Orgel (Count d'Orgel's Ball). This novel, also dealing with adultery, was published posthumously in 1924 and also proved controversial. Albert Thibaudet writes that the novel displays une étonnante capacité d'abstraction, de schématisme et de mouvement. [transl. "an astonishing capacity of abstraction, schematism and movement."] Cocteau's significant alterations to the text of the novel have caused controversy of a different order: in the introduction to the 1984 Flammarion edition of the book, literary historian Bruno Vercier refers to Cocteau as restaurateur trop zélé [transl. "overzealous restorer"]. Radiguet was a self-consciously classicist writer; this is visible in the mythological influence present in much of his work, the stylistic aspirations toward simplicity and purity of expression, and his own words in his literary criticism. Vercier claims, however, that through revisions overemphasizing the influence of 17th-century moralists such as La Bruyère and La Rochefoucauld, Cocteau warps the novel into "le manifeste d'une nouvelle école classique française" [transl. "the manifesto of a new French classical school"].

In addition to his two novels, Radiguet's works include a few poetry volumes and a play. Critics are divided on the merits of Radiguet's poetry and the seriousness of his poetic efforts. Clément Vautel, writing in 1925 in response to Le Figaro's review of Radiguet's poetry collection Les Joues en feu (Cheeks on Fire), referred to the poems as les prétentieuses absurdités qu'on veut nous faire admirer à tout prix [transl. the pretentious absurdities that they want to make us admire at all costs.] In his preface to Radiguet's Poetic Works, Georges-Emmanuel Clancier praises des accents ingénus ou provocants, purs ou gracieusement grivois ... l'écho de l'enfance et de ses jeux depuis si peu de temps quittés [transl. "guileless or provocative accents, pure or gracefully bawdy ... the echo of childhood and of its games so recently left behind."] Roger Martin du Gard criticizes those who, patronizingly in his view, praise Radiguet's poetry for its precociousness and redolence of childhood, offering this assessment:

Radiguet, dans ses poèmes, ne semble pas s’être sacrifié ni s’être soumis aux vieilles règles du jeu. Un manque de composition y est évident. Toute sa poésie est faite de faux pas, de naïvetés [...] Adorable fraîcheur, certes, mais des gaucheries, des négligences, feintes ou non, des inversions souvent agaçantes [...] interdisent, les premières surprises goûtées, une admiration sans retenue.

[Radiguet, in his poems, seems not to have sacrificed himself nor to have submitted to the old rules of the game. The lack of composition is marked. All his poetry is made of faux pas, of naïvetés [...] Lovely freshness, certainly, but moments of clumsiness and negligence, feigned or not, as well as frequently irritating inversions [...] forbid, once the first surprise has faded, an unrestrained admiration.]

== Death ==
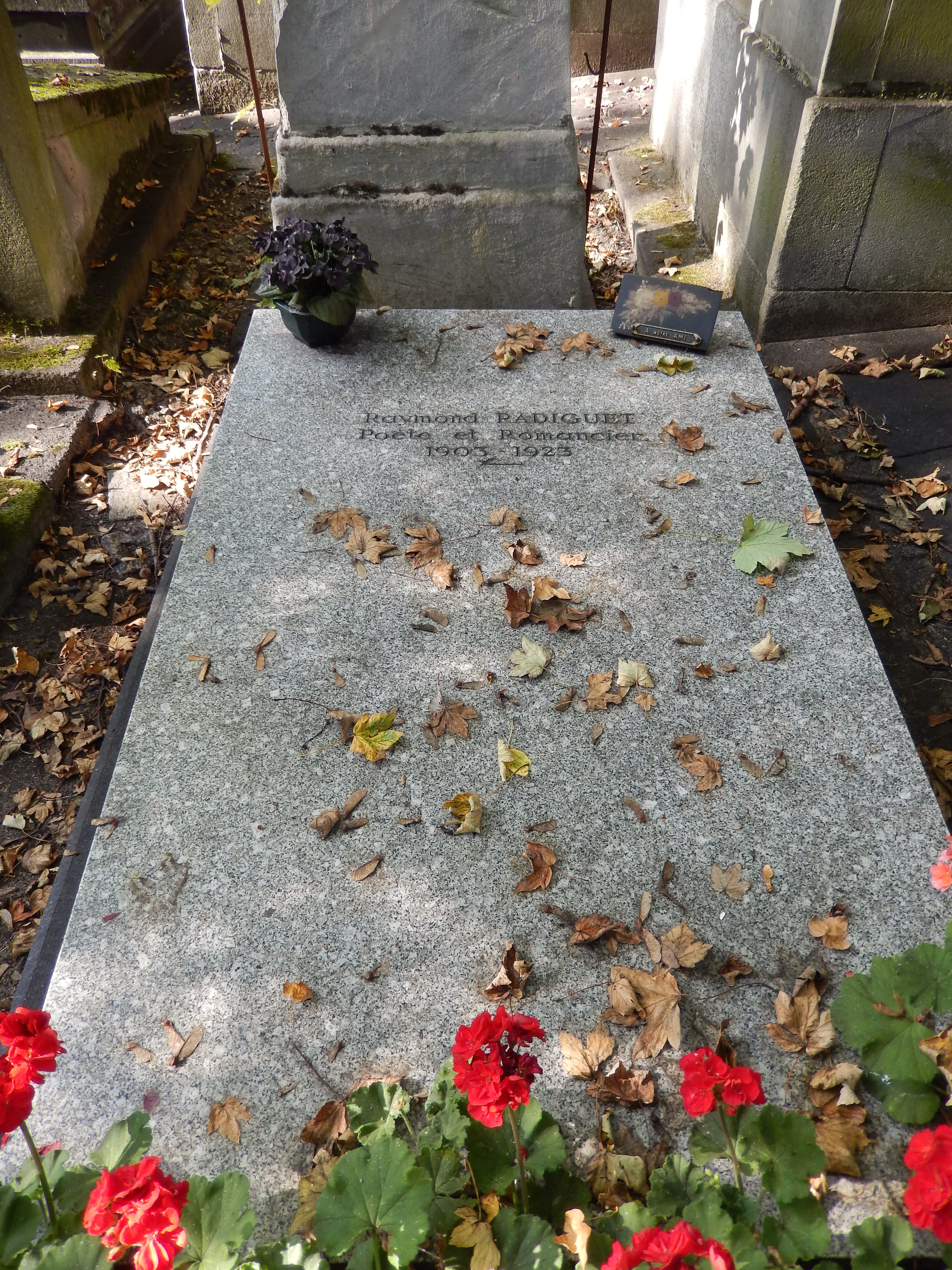
Tomb of Raymond Radiguet, "Poet and Novelist," Père-Lachaise Cemetery, Paris.

On 12 December 1923, Radiguet died at the age of 20 in Paris of typhoid fever, which he contracted after a trip he took with Cocteau. Contaminated oysters have been suggested as the vector. When he fell ill, Radiguet was staying at a hotel associated with the Restaurant Foyot. Cocteau initially consulted a charlatan, Dr. Albert Capmas, who misdiagnosed the illness; Radiguet was beyond recovery by the time he was taken to a clinic. It has been suggested that Cocteau's jealousy over Radiguet's engagement to Perlmutter caused him to neglect his care; Cocteau's failure to watch over Radiguet during the last night of his illness, and subsequently to attend his funeral, constituted "une forme de scandale dont on ne parlait qu'à voix basse" [transl. "a kind of scandal only spoken about in hushed voices"], according to Radiguet's friend Valentine Hugo, writing on the thirtieth anniversary of his death.

Both Maurice Radiguet and Jean Cocteau recounted an anecdote in which Radiguet declares, shortly before his death, that he is going to be "fusillé par les soldats de Dieu" [transl. "shot by the soldiers of God."] Maurice Radiguet said it occurred the evening before his death, whereas Cocteau said it occurred three days prior. In reaction to Radiguet's death, Poulenc wrote, "For two days I was unable to do anything, I was so stunned". Several other friends of Radiguet's reported premonitions prior to his death. Jean Hugo writes that during a séance, a spirit giving its name as "Beauharnais"—Radiguet traced his maternal lineage back to a relative of Joséphine de Beauharnais—had Radiguet dismissed from the room, then told the others gathered: "Je veux sa jeunesse." [transl. "I want his youth."] Bernard Grasset wrote that at their last meeting, Radiguet gave him his scarf as a keepsake.

In her 1932 memoir Laughing Torso, British artist Nina Hamnett describes Radiguet's funeral:

The church was crowded with people. In the pew in front of us was the negro band from Le Boeuf sur le Toit. Picasso was there, Brâncuși and so many celebrated people that I cannot remember their names. Radiguet's death was a terrible shock to everyone. Coco Chanel, the celebrated dressmaker, arranged the funeral. It was most wonderfully done.

Radiguet is buried at Père-Lachaise Cemetery, division 56.

== Legacy ==
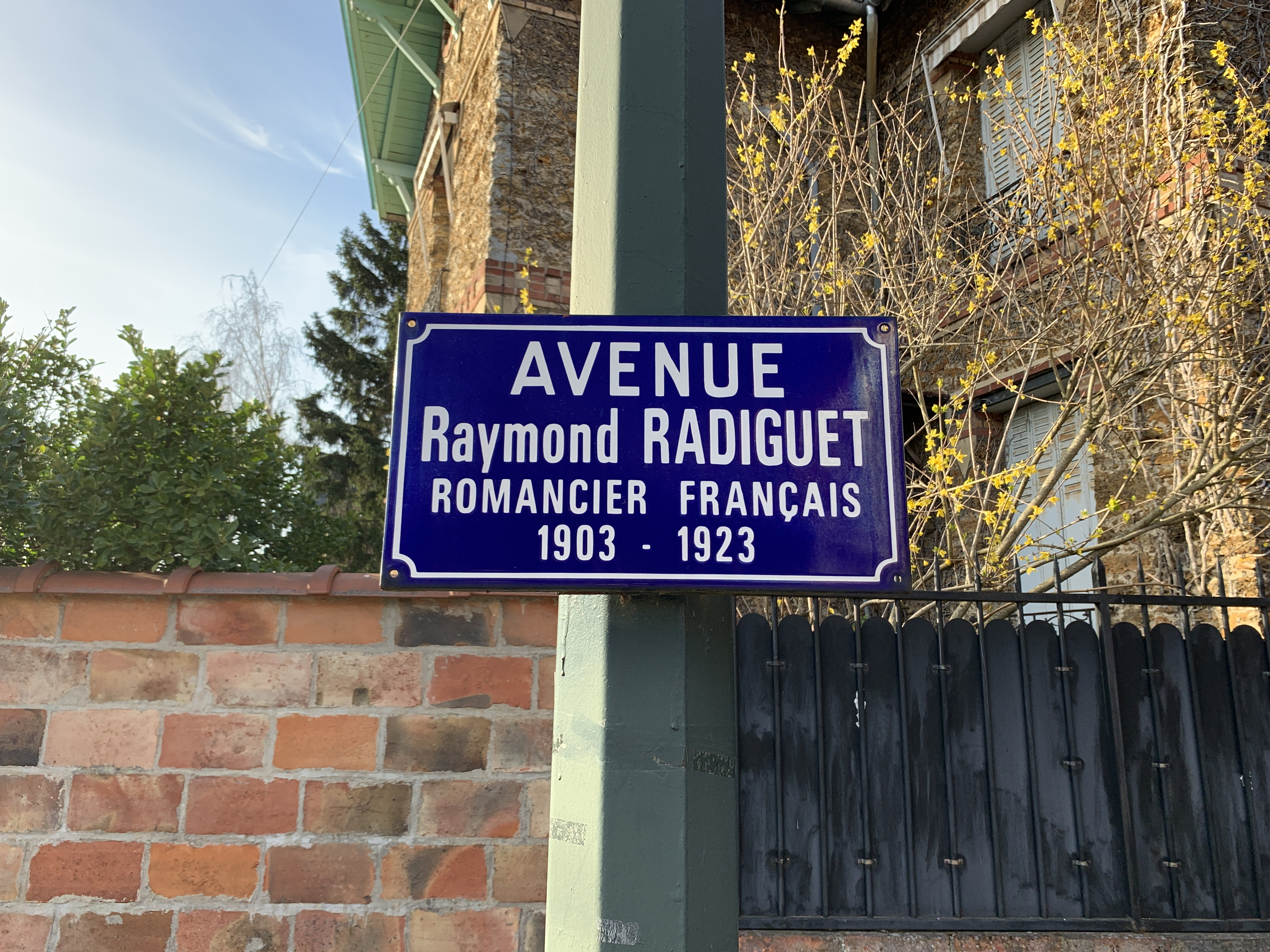
Avenue Raymond Radiguet, Saint-Maur-des-Fossés.

In 1945, Stead and Blake wrote that admirers of Le Diable au corps "include the most discriminating of critics." Aldous Huxley is quoted as declaring that Radiguet had attained in his short life a literary control that others required a long career to reach. François Mauriac said that Le Diable au corps is "unretouched and seems shocking, but nothing so resembles cynicism as clairvoyance. No adolescent before Radiguet has delivered to us the secret of that age: we have all falsified it." In his commentary on the Hagakure, Japanese writer Yukio Mishima writes that Le Bal du Comte d'Orgel was "the book that thrilled me most" as a child, and that Radiguet became a sort of adolescent rival for him, as he expected to die equally early in World War II.

Radiguet left behind plans for a novel based on the life of Charles I, Duke of Orléans. A volume of erotic verse, Vers libres, was published posthumously. The fact of Radiguet's authorship of these poems was not acknowledged by his family, or by Cocteau, for many years. According to the Indiana University Bloomington exhibition Banned Books, which contained an edition of Vers libres with artwork by Rojan, the collection "often mingles innocence and inchoate sexuality. The pornographic poems depict young girls who lose their virginity, indulge in Sapphic behavior in public, or are suggestively chastised by older men." The book was seized by U.S. Customs in 1951.

Radiguet is the last entry in André Gide's Anthologie de la Poèsie Française; Gide selects for inclusion "Amélie" from Devoirs de vacances and "Avec la mort tu te maries..." from Les Joues en feu. A character in Gide's Les Faux-monnayeurs, Léon Ghéridanisol, may have been named after Radiguet, the first three syllables of the character's surname roughly anagramming phonetically to "Radiguet."

Numerous portraits of Radiguet exist, by artists such as Pablo Picasso, Amedeo Modigliani, Man Ray, and Valentine Hugo, along with many drawings of him by Jean Cocteau. An avenue in Saint-Maur-des-Fossés is named after him.

== Works ==
- Les Joues en feu (1920) – poetry, translated by Alan Stone as Cheeks on Fire: Collected Poems
- Le Gendarme incompris (1921) – play, with Jean Cocteau
- Devoirs de vacances (1921) – poetry, translated as Holiday Homework
- Les Pelican (1921) – drama, translated by Michael Benedikt and George Wellworth as The Pelicans
- Le Diable au corps (1923) – novel, translated by Kay Boyle as The Devil in the Flesh
- Le Bal du comte d'Orgel (1924) – novel, variously translated as The Count's Ball, Count d'Orgel Opens the Ball, and Count d'Orgel's Ball
- Oeuvres completes (1952) – complete works

== Film adaptations ==
In 1947, Claude Autant-Lara released his film Le diable au corps, based on Radiguet's novel and starring Gérard Philipe. Coming just after World War II, the movie caused controversy in its turn. Among the other cinematic versions of Radiguet's story, the heavily adapted version by Marco Bellocchio, Il diavolo in corpo (1986), was notable as being among the first mainstream films to show unsimulated sex.

In 1970, Le Bal du comte d'Orgel was adapted into a film, starring Jean-Claude Brialy as Comte Anne d'Orgel. It was the last movie directed by Marc Allégret. In 2000, Radiguet's life and work were examined by Jean-Christophe Averty in Les deux vies du chat Radiguet, for the TV series Un siècle d'écrivains.
