= Molteno (surname) =

Molteno is a surname of Italian origin derived from the town of Molteno near Lecco. Rare in Italy itself, it is occasionally found in the Italian diaspora. Due to an early presence in Africa and generations of intermarriage, it has also become a South African surname, and it is especially common among Xhosa-speaking people.

Notable people with the surname include:

- Donald Barkly Molteno (1908–1972), also known as Dilizintaba, Barrister and anti-apartheid leader
- Edward Molteno (1877–1950), Cape exporter
- Elizabeth Maria Molteno (1852–1927), early suffragette and civil rights activist
- Harry Molteno (1880–1969), Cape exporter
- James Tennant Molteno (1865–1936), the first Speaker of the South African Parliament
- John Charles Molteno (1814–1886), The first Prime Minister of the Cape Colony
- John Charles Molteno, Jr. (1860–1924), Cape exporter and parliamentarian
- Marion Molteno (born 1944), South African novelist
- Mbombini Molteno Sihele, Xhosa councillor, warrior and national poet of the Thembu people
- Percy Molteno (1861–1937), Scottish-South African shipping magnate and Liberal member of parliament
- Vincent Barkly Molteno (1872–1952), Admiral of the Royal Navy in World War I

== See also ==
- Molteni (surname)
- Molteno (disambiguation)
