= Bernard Armitage =

Bernard William Francis Armitage (6 July 1890 – 25 August 1976) was an English physician and psychiatrist specialising in sexual psychology. A Fellow of the British Psychological Society, and a member of the Royal College of Surgeons, the Royal College of Physicians, and the Council of the Royal Medico-Psychological Association, he taught at Cambridge, the Bethlem Royal Hospital, and St Bart's.

== Early life ==
The son of William Armitage, a Fellow of the Zoological Society of London, Armitage was educated at Gresham's School, Holt, St John's College, Cambridge, and St Bartholomew's Hospital, London. His mother, Clara Armitage, was a niece of Sir Jonathan Hutchinson.

Between 1910 and 1912 Armitage represented Cambridge in the three miles race against Oxford. He also ran for a combined Oxford and Cambridge team against one from Harvard and Yale and was President of the Cambridge University Ski and Ice Hockey Club. He graduated BA in 1913 and proceeded to MA in 1918.

== Career ==
During the First World War Armitage was commissioned into the Royal Army Medical Corps. In 1918 he was appointed a Member of the British Repatriation Commission. From 1919 to 1925 he was a Fellow and Tutor of St John's College, Cambridge, and simultaneously Demonstrator of Anatomy in the University of Cambridge. In 1920 he was appointed as a Medical Adviser to the 1920 Summer Olympics at Antwerp.

He was Director of Psychotherapy at the Bethlem Royal Hospital from 1935 to 1941 and of the Medico-Psychological Department of St Bart's.

On 6 December 1936, during that year's abdication crisis, Armitage wrote to Stanley Baldwin, the prime minister, about King Edward VIII's relationship with Wallis Simpson, marking his letter "Secret and Confidential". His diagnosis was that the King had suffered as a young man from "social and sexual inadequacy". He ended "The stage was set for disaster".

== Private life ==
In 1938, Armitage married Lucy Mitchell Molteno, a daughter of John Charles Molteno, Jr., a South African politician, and granddaughter of Sir John Charles Molteno, Prime Minister of the Cape Colony.

In Who's Who he stated his recreations as "painting, music, field sports and country pursuits, travel".

== Honours ==
- Freeman of the City of London
