= Vula Bula =

Vula Bula is the trademark name of a number of openly licensed and representative reading resources, that were iteratively developed by the R&D Unit at the Molteno Institute for Language and Literacy over a period of 50 years.

In South Africa, English and Afrikaans are still the dominant languages, despite 12 languages that have been given official status. Only a small percentage of commercially published children's books are authored in South Africa's other languages. This failure to cater for vernacular language speakers reading needs is notable contributory factor to South Africa's reading crisis.

Foundational reading skills are lacking, and the phonics programmes necessary for reading fluency are in short supply. Vula Bula isintended to teach early reading in South Africa's nine official African languages, the Zenex Foundation partially funded the licensing of these works as an Open Education Resources under a CC-BY-NC-ND license.

Vula Bula's phonically leveled readers take into consideration the respective orthography of each language. Using the CC-BY-NC-ND license and the Molteno Trust platform, the Vula Bula readers have won numerous accolades and are used regularly for teaching reading in public schools.

Vula Bula now belongs to Halala! Education, since Molteno closed down at the end of 2023.
