= Percy Molteno =

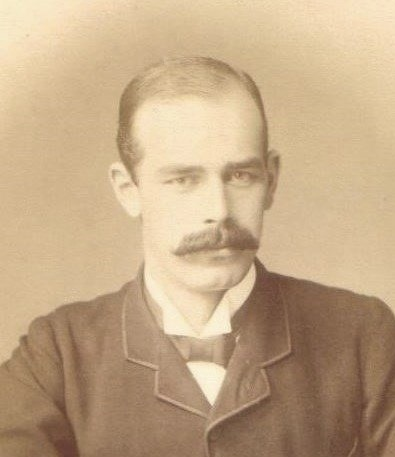

Personal details
- Born: 12 September 1861 Edinburgh, Scotland
- Died: 19 September 1937 (aged 76) Zurich, Switzerland
- Party: Liberal
- Occupation: Politician, Shipping magnate, Philanthropist

Percy Alport Molteno (12 September 1861 – 19 September 1937) was an Edinburgh-born South African lawyer, company director, politician and philanthropist who was a British Liberal Member of Parliament (MP) from 1906 to 1918.

== Early life ==
Molteno was born in Edinburgh, the second son of John Molteno, an Anglo-Italian immigrant to South Africa who later served as the Cape's first Prime Minister. His father named him in honour of his old friend and business colleague, Percy John Alport. He attended Diocesan College (Bishops), took first place in the Cape matric examination and achieved academic honours at Trinity College, Cambridge, before being called to the bar as a barrister at the Inner Temple in London.

== Shipping magnate ==
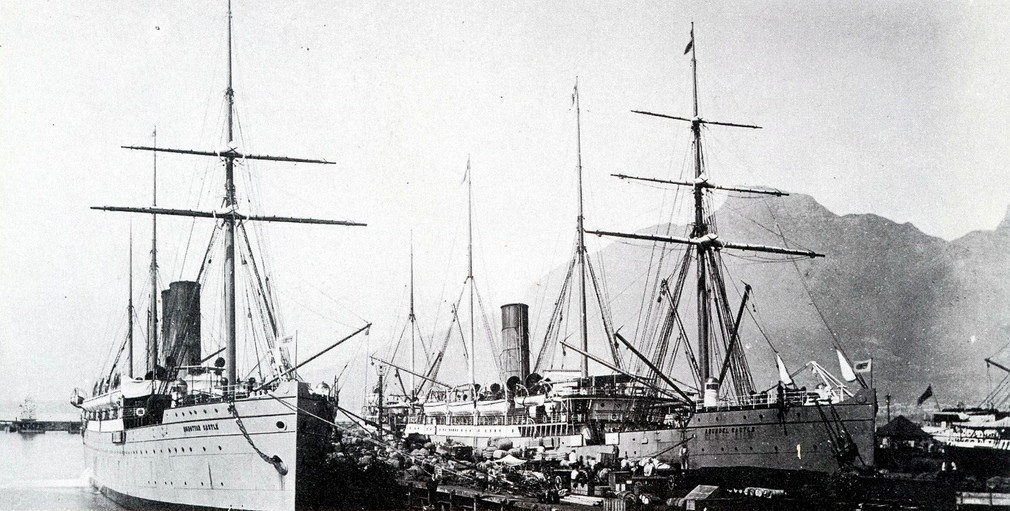
Union-Castle liners in Cape Town harbour. Early 1900s.

After qualifying as a barrister, and practising law in the Cape for several years, he moved to Britain to accept a partnership in the firm of Donald Currie & Company, managers of the Castle (later, the Union-Castle) Line and even married Sir Donald Currie's daughter Elizabeth.

As chairman of the Union Castle Company he oversaw a massive expansion in export shipping lines from Southern Africa, eventually, through these shipping lines, controlling the routes of the bulk of southern Africa's foreign trade.

From the beginning, he saw great potential in South Africa's agricultural exports. His father had undertaken the first experimental export of fruit as a young man in 1841, loading a ship with dried fruit for the Australian market. Percy however, was keenly interested in the possibility of using the new science of refrigeration to allow South African produce to be successfully shipped to the enormous European consumer markets, thereby opening them up for South African exports.

Having a scientific frame of mind, he embarked on an extensive process of research and experiments in refrigeration techniques for large shipping vessels. The result was that he developed and brought in new refrigeration methods to allow for the first successful introduction of South African fruit to European and other overseas markets. On 31 January 1892, when the first shipment arrived in Britain, John X. Merriman from the Cape Government accompanied him to see the cases opened, and when case after case opened in perfect condition, the relief and joy was immense. Land prices in the Cape immediately shot up, and a new economic chapter was opened for Southern Africa.

At the same time, he established Southern Africa's first fruit export organisation, with an eye to developing and controlling the Cape's agricultural exports. Although this was originally set up as a syndicate with other members of his family (particularly his brothers William and John Molteno), he soon shared his discoveries and influenced many other shipping companies to install refrigeration chambers on their vessels. Nonetheless, in the ensuing decades, it was his two youngest brothers, Edward and Harry Molteno, who eventually took over most of southern Africa's export fruit industry.

He is consequently regarded as the pioneer of the South African export fruit industry.

== Political career ==
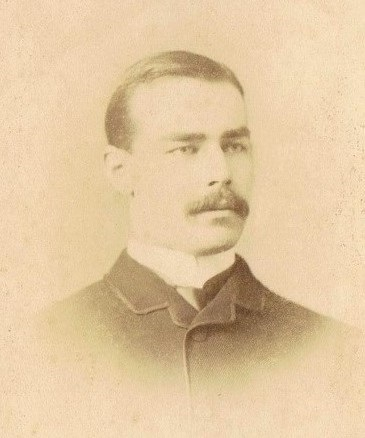
Molteno as a young man

Molteno was elected in 1906 as a Liberal Member of the UK Parliament (MP) for Dumfriesshire, where he came to represent a radical wing of the British Liberal Party.

He had originally needed to move to London to oversee his vast network of international shipping lines, but he remained deeply attached to southern Africa. His close friend the activist John Tengo Jabavu called him "a true son of the soil, and a South African patriot I know and admire". He also remained closely involved in its politics, through his many influential family members, as well as through his friendship with nearly all of the most powerful South African politicians and businessmen.

He was a prolific letter-writer who corresponded with many of the leading political figures of the colony. His writings and politics were guided by two main themes: his advocacy of responsible government and his staunch opposition to the Boer War. Those views made him a divisive figure both inside and outside the Liberal Party, of which he was a member: Winston Churchill once refused to attend a dinner if they were sitting together, and Henry Simpson Lunn reports fearing that his windows would be smashed if word got out that Molteno was present at his club.

Southern Africa in the late 1800s; with the Cape Colony coloured blue, and the Boer republics in orange

=== Opposition to the Boer War ===
In the early 1890s, the rise of pro-imperialist politicians such as Cecil Rhodes, Joseph Chamberlain and Alfred Milner heralded a change in the foreign policy of the UK government regarding Southern Africa, and the earliest signs of the coming war.

From very early on, Molteno foresaw the nature of the upcoming conflict and, through his correspondence with the leading politicians of the day, sought to warn them, and attack "official ignorance in high places of the realities in South Africa". As the war drew nearer, he threw his influence and fortune behind the minority "peace party" (which now included his colleagues "Onze Jan" Hofmeyr, Jacobus W. Sauer and John X. Merriman), and he severed business relations with Rhodes and other prominent figures, whom he saw as instigators. He was also a chairman of the South Africa Conciliation Committee.

Finally, when war broke out, he took his place in the heart of British society as openly "Pro-Boer".

Not surprisingly the effects of such political activism on his business empire were devastating.

In 1896, after the Jameson Raid, he wrote to the William Schreiner:

"What a blow to all our hopes of friendly feeling and consolidation of races has been given by the wicked attempt of foolish men, elated by the enormous gains which Africa has yielded to them - what a miserable return to have made to her for such benefits!"

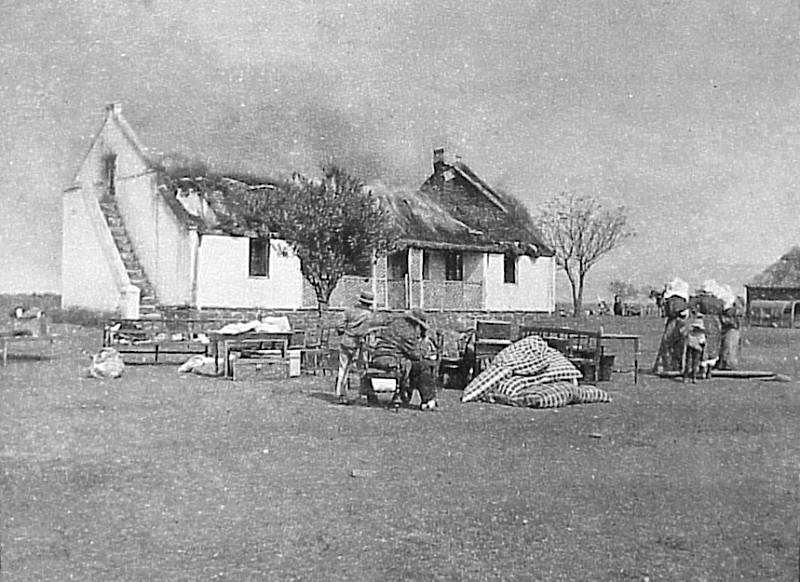
Molteno was prominent in condemning the British forces' use of 'scorched earth' tactics against the Boer guerrillas.

=== Postwar reconstruction ===
In the years following the Boer War, Molteno withdrew from the shipping trade and devoted both himself and his remaining fortune to postwar humanitarian efforts in South Africa.

Having returned to South Africa to see what he could do to "salvage something from the wreckage" and experience first-hand where need was most urgent, Molteno traveled extensively through the war-ravaged country, setting up relief funds and even adopting war orphans. The degree of his involvement surprised even his fellow liberals; as Catherine Courtney wrote to him in 1902, "You seem to spend yourself body, soul and fortune as if the war lay on your conscience alone". Furious about Lord Kitchener's use of scorched earth tactics and concentration camps against the Boers, he also continued the work that he had started during the height of the war with Emily Hobhouse, exposing the atrocities and setting up institutions for the rehabilitation of survivors.

=== Movement towards union ===
Molteno entered the British House of Commons as the Member for Dumfriesshire in 1906, and soon used his increased parliamentary influence in the direction of the granting of full Responsible Government to the "ex-Republics" in southern Africa.

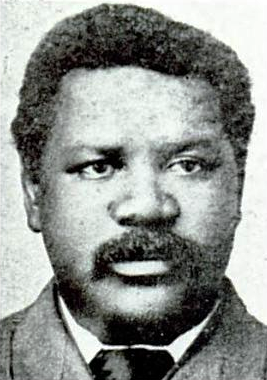
John Tengo Jabavu, educator and activist, was a close friend and political ally of Molteno.

He was deeply involved in the process leading up to the Union of South Africa in 1910. He was also the adviser and confidant of a number of leading South African statesmen during this process.

Molteno saw the upcoming union as politically inevitable and not necessarily a bad thing. He had, after all, been advocating the ending of animosities between British South Africans and Boers for years. However, he was deeply concerned about the movement to unite all white South Africans, regardless of which European ethnic groups they descended from, in a common policy of politically excluding black South Africans.

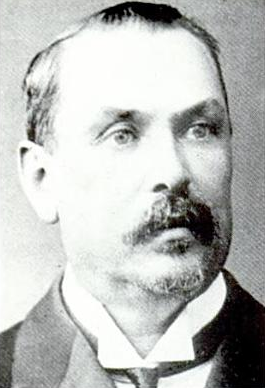
General Louis Botha, Boer war hero and first Prime Minister of the Union of South Africa.

Molteno had been acutely aware of the earliest beginnings of that tendency many years earlier, and it increasingly became his primary concern about the political future of South Africa. It also led him to intensify his support for the cause of black African nationalist movements, and activists such as John Tengo Jabavu. Jabavu was a political ally and old friend of his brothers, the Cape Members of Parliament John and James Molteno, and had worked with Percy from the time of the Boer War. Molteno was particularly involved in Jabavu's "Imvo Zabantsundu" newspaper, in which he also had shares, and decades later, when Jabavu's son wrote his father's biography, he dedicated it to their family friend as "...a token of thanks, for deeds of true friendship to the hero of this work." In addition, during this time he used his influence in both Africa & London to attack the pass laws in the Boer republics, their "brutal" labour laws, the practise of flogging, the morality act, discriminatory taxation (the hut tax), restricted land rights, martial law with its closing down of black African political publications, and the recommendations of the Native Affairs Commission.

Molteno supported the extension of the Cape's multiracial "Cape Qualified Franchise" into a system of universal franchise across South Africa. It was widely known that it would inevitably result in black majority rule. However, the political predicament on the eve of Union was that it course of action was supported only by a few white liberals and black politicians in the Cape, and the overwhelming majority of the predominantly-white electorate across Southern Africa was strongly opposed to that outcome. Besides, the British government was inclined to support the opposition.

Thus, supporters of universal franchise, led by JW Sauer, Cape Prime Minister Merriman and Molteno himself, fought a losing battle, and General Louis Botha rode the wave of white public opinion to power by publicly opposing nonracial politics.

A final compromise saved a weak form of qualified franchise but only in the liberal Cape. Molteno, who increasingly saw even the qualified franchise as insufficiently inclusive, called the compromise "pathetic" and predicted a worsening struggle over the issue of political rights. His later letters to Botha and Merriman (1914) warn of history repeating itself in "poor South Africa" and of approaching troubles to which he could see no end.

== Later life and humanitarian work ==
Percy Molteno in later life

Developments after the Union like the rise of Afrikaner nationalism and apartheid led to his disillusionment with South African politics and his increasing devotion to humanitarian issues such as the Vienna Emergency Relief Fund, which he started in 1919.

In South Africa, he publicly supported and donated large sums of money to the fundraising activities of John Dube and the infant African National Congress (ANC). In addition, he later offered his name and international network of connections to assist Dube and his cause. Sol Plaatje was another African nationalist to receive his support.

Molteno was a rationalist and a great supporter of scientific endeavour (The Molteno Institute was his endowment to Cambridge University in 1921). His scientific work was primarily with refrigeration and hydro-electricity (he designed the hydro-electric power station at Glen Lyon), but he had a passion for Biology and was a keen student of Darwin, Huxley and Herbert Spencer. He also shared his father's love of animals. This may have been one of the reasons why, though he was an excellent shot, he never joined in the hunts which were a popular pastime of the wealthy at the time. In his personal beliefs, he was an atheist (though he preferred the term "Lucretian") and founded the Common Sense magazine where he intended writers to present articles on controversial issues of the time that were based on reason, evidence and ethics, rather than on emotion and nationalism.

He was also a fellow of the Royal Horticultural Society, chairman of the South African Real Estate Corporation, and a founder of the Royal Institute of International Affairs, together with Otto Beit and Baron Rothschild.

In person, family friend Frederick Selous described him "acutely intelligent" and unusually open-minded.

A very unostentatious man who despised flatterers and time-servers, he throughout his life repeatedly refused titles and honours, though his influence behind the scenes was immense. Famously, when Prime Minister Botha initially refused to attend the 1907 Imperial Conference to discuss Union, it was a personal and undisclosed cable from Molteno that brought Botha to London in a cooperative frame of mind.

Molteno's family was originally Italian and, throughout his life, he visited Italy for extended periods. He was, particularly, attached to the island of Sicily and, in his later life, he spent more time there. He died in 1937 at the age of 76, on a trip to Zurich.

Parliament of the United Kingdom
Preceded by William Herries Maxwell	Member of Parliament for Dumfriesshire; 1906–1918	Succeeded by William Murray
