= Molteni =

Molteni may refer to:

- Molteni (cycling team), Italian professional road bicycle racing team
- Molteni (surname), people with the surname Molteni
- Molteni&C, a Milan furniture company, part of the Molteni Group
