= John Charles Molteno Jr. =

South African exporter and Parliament member

John Molteno
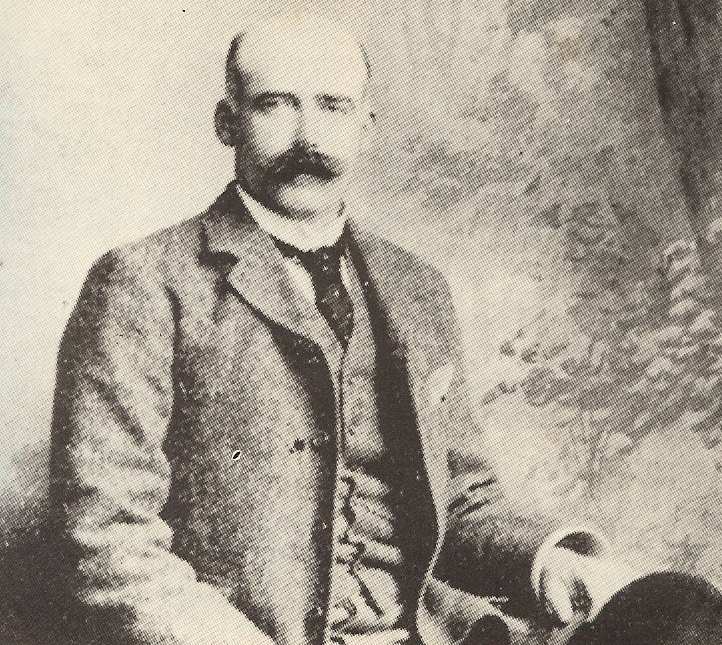
- John Molteno Jr. in later life as an MP

Personal details
- Born: 4 March 1860 Beaufort West, Cape Colony
- Died: 23 March 1924 (aged 64) Cape Town, South Africa
- Party: Independent
- Occupation: Politician, farmer

John Charles Molteno Jr. (4 March 1860 – 23 March 1924) M.L.A., was a South African exporter and Member of Parliament.

He was a prominent anti-imperialist of the Cape Colony, and a denouncer of British policies which led to the Boer War, chairing the South Africa Conciliation Committee in Cape Town. He was also a supporter of expanded civil rights for Black Africans, and recognised, very early on, the need for them to play a leading role in South Africa's political future.

== Family and business ==
Molteno was the son of the Cape's first Prime Minister, Sir John Charles Molteno (senior). From a very young age he served as his father’s private secretary, helping to manage his family's diverse political and business interests, and did not join his brothers in studying in Cambridge.

After his father’s death he took over much of the family’s businesses, and managed their enormous Karoo farms. He formed and ran an export syndicate with his brothers William and Percy, which undertook Southern Africa's first successful fruit export to Europe and dominated the industry for many years. However, later he handed his remaining operations over to his brother William, and retired from business. For the duration of his career, he served as the confidential agent of his brother, the shipping magnate Percy Molteno.

== Member of Parliament ==
He was elected to the Cape Parliament in 1889 by a predominantly Black African constituency, partially on account of his history of blunt and outspoken support for greater Black political empowerment. He was most famous at the time for supporting a republican form of government for the Cape. His other principle political concern was the welfare of agricultural communities and he was widely considered the parliamentary expert on rural development. For over 20 years he served as representative for Thembuland and Jansenville.

=== The Boer War ===
He was initially a friend and business associate of Cecil Rhodes, but he publicly broke off ties, blaming Rhodes's discriminatory legislation against the Cape's Black African population and his policies regarding the Boer Republics. Molteno went on to become one of the most outspoken denouncers of Rhodes and other statesmen perceived at the time as strongly pro-imperialist, such as Chamberlain and Milner.

He was also a prominent critic of the policies that led up to the Boer War, and co-founded the newspaper South African News with JW Sauer, to counter what he perceived to be a pro-imperialist bias in the mainstream newspapers which were controlled by De Beers and political allies of Rhodes. The British Colonial Office had the Cape under martial law at the time, so predictably the paper fought a long-running battle against censorship. Its editor was even jailed at one point.

Molteno was the elected chairman of the South Africa Conciliation Committee, when it was founded in Cape Town in early 1900 to oppose the Boer War.

=== The Union of South Africa ===
Molteno was extremely active in the years after the Boer war. He was on nearly all the major parliamentary committees and was chairman of the Government Land Commission. Like his younger brother and fellow parliamentarian James Molteno, he was a supporter of John X. Merriman's party, and for the extension, across southern Africa, of equal political rights for Black Africans. However, he could count on the support of only a small minority of the (predominantly white) electorate to support Black African suffrage, and eventually this possibility was abrogated in London.

Although he was required to represent the Karroo constituency of Jansenville for several years, it was Thembuland which was his closest concern in later life. Contemporary accounts tell of the immense amounts of time he spent working to politically mobilise the Thembu people, a nation of "natural politicians" who comfortably engaged Molteno in political discussions lasting many hours. In spite of his different race, his understanding of the Thembu language and culture supplemented his forceful and charismatic leadership style and went some way towards making him acceptable to this black constituency. Having early on recognised and declared the leading role that Black Africans needed to play in the South Africa's future, Molteno worked for much of his life attempting to lay the foundation for such a transition. He was a particularly close friend and political ally of the controversial activist John Tengo Jabavu, whom he had previously attempted to persuade to stand for election to the Cape Parliament. Jabavu once remarked how they had worked together so long that, in some quarters, their names were regarded as completely interchangeable.

== Later life ==
An unusually tall, athletic man, fond of hunting, riding and the outdoor life, Molteno was described as having a strong voice and commanding presence. He died suddenly in 1924, at the age of 64, survived by his American-born wife Lucy Mitchell and his five children. In 1938 his daughter Lucy Mitchell Molteno married the British physician Bernard Armitage.

Molteno was remembered by colleagues for his irreverent, sarcastic, but good-natured sense of humour, as well as for his sense of public-spirit. Ons Land, in its public tribute, hailed his "firm principles" and described him as "a man of character and a strong personality" (Ons Land, 1924).

Political offices
Preceded by ???	Representative of Thembuland; 1889–1898	Succeeded by ???
Preceded by ???	Representative of Jansenville; 1898–1910	Succeeded by Almero Oosthuizen
