= Molteni (surname) =

Molteni is an Italian surname derived from the town of Molteno near Lecco. It is also common in the Italian diaspora. People with the surname include:

- Ambrogio Molteni, Italian film director and screenwriter
- Andrés Molteni (born 1988), Argentine tennis player
- Antoine Molteni (1786–1866), Paris-based optician and colleague of Daguerre
- Benedetta Emilia Agricola-Molteni (1722–1780), Italian soprano
- Betty Molteni (born 1962), Italian runner
- Carla Molteni (born 1966), Italian Professor of Physics
- Carlos Alberto Molteni, Argentine naval aviator
- François Marie Alfred Molteni (1837–1907), French scientist and optician
- Giorgio Molteni (born 1949), Italian film director and screenwriter
- Giuseppe Molteni (1800–1867), Italian painter
- Luis Molteni (1950–2024), Italian actor
- Marco Molteni (born 1976), Italian volleyball player
- Nicola Molteni (born 1976), Italian politician
- Simone Molteni (born 1992), Italian lightweight rower
- Westher Molteni (born 1987), Swiss volleyball player

== See also ==
- Boris Moltenis (born 1999), French soccer player
- Molteni (cycling team), Italian professional road bicycle racing team
- Molteno (surname)
