= Elizabeth Maria Molteno =

South African-British activist

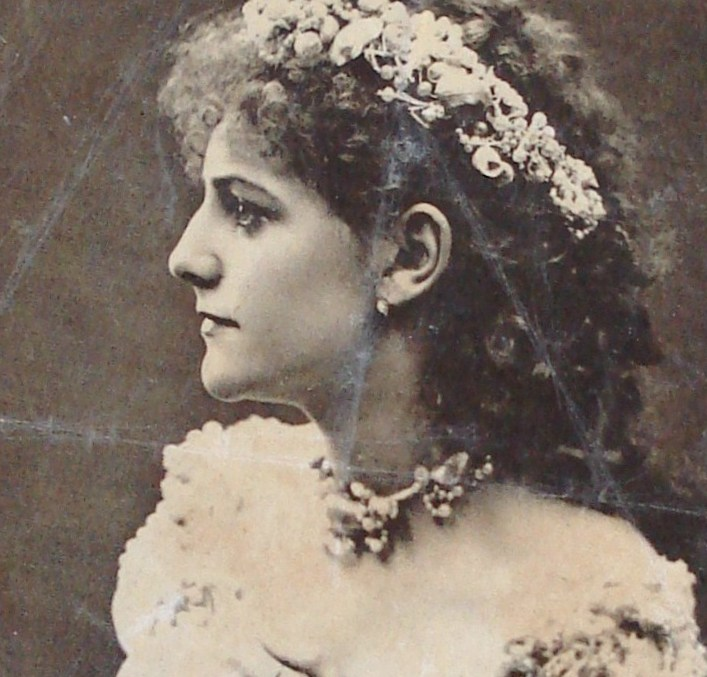
- Born: 24 September 1852; Beaufort West, Cape Colony
- Died: 25 August 1927 (aged 74); Trevone, United Kingdom
- Occupations: Suffragist, civil rights activist

Elizabeth Maria Molteno (24 September 1852 – 25 August 1927), was an early South African British activist for civil and women's rights in South Africa.

== Early life ==
Elizabeth was born into an influential Cape family of Italian origin. She was the oldest and much beloved daughter of John Molteno, the first Prime Minister of the Cape, and many of her 18 siblings came to hold positions of influence in business and government. She spent her earliest years in the protected surroundings of her family's Claremont estate in Cape Town, where she was educated. Her father travelled frequently, for diplomatic or business reasons, and he often let his older children accompany him on such trips. Consequently, Elizabeth travelled a great deal as a child, especially to Italy and London, and grew up to share her father's interest in politics and current affairs.

Fiercely intelligent, with a strong personality and an extraordinary memory, she developed views and habits which were unconventional for a girl in the Victorian era. "Betty", as she preferred to be called, abandoned the fine clothes and material privileges of her youth. She took on a simple lifestyle, rough clothes and vegetarianism, and showed more interest in science and politics, than in marriage and children. In her personal beliefs she claimed to be spiritual but non-religious, and she acquired a firm lifelong belief in the principles of gender and racial equality. After matriculating, she chose not to marry, but to study further at Newnham College, Cambridge.

== Educationalist ==
Choosing one of the few careers that were open to women in the 19th century, she became a teacher, and then the principal of the Collegiate School for girls in Port Elizabeth. There she revolutionised the Victorian education system, which was heavily based on rote learning and was restricted to subjects that were deemed appropriate for women. She applied methods of teaching which were advanced and liberal for the time, including what was probably the first system of sex education for girls in the country. She had an ardent lifelong belief in the importance of girls' education, so much so that she refused to draw a salary for her administrative and educational work.

== Political activism ==
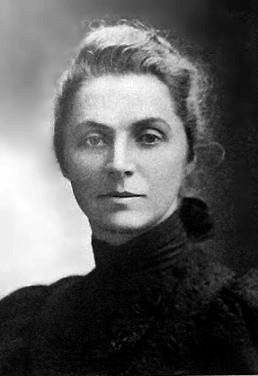
Emily Hobhouse, the British welfare campaigner and a close friend of Elizabeth Molteno

She was openly against the Anglo-Boer War when it began, and for this reason was forced to give up her job. Anti-war activists were generally labelled as "pro-Boer" by their opponents, and were put under great social pressure. The white community of Port Elizabeth was also strongly pro-British and when Miss Molteno refused to stop her protests she was forced to resign, despite a campaign of support from her ex-pupils and colleagues.

She moved back to Cape Town in 1899 and became a founding member of the South Africa Conciliation Committee. Here she co-organised a series of mass meetings, attended by thousands, to protest the war and the ethnic divisions it was causing. Miss Molteno had become close friends with Emily Hobhouse and Olive Schreiner and worked with them on humanitarian and anti-war causes both during and after the Boer War. With them, she passionately campaigned for the Boer women and children interned in the British concentration camps and the burning of the Boer farmlands. In Port Elizabeth she also made the acquaintance of Alice Greene (aunt of the writer Graham Greene), who was her employee as the vice-principal of the Collegiate School and was also involved in anti-war activism. The two women had very similar views and thereafter maintained a lifelong friendship.

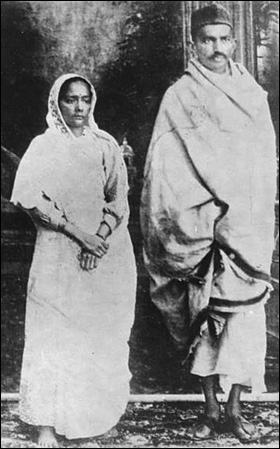
Gandhi and his wife Kasturbha in 1914.

After the war, Miss Molteno opposed the radical new political developments in South Africa and left for England. There she met Gandhi in 1909. They became friends, exchanged ideas and regularly corresponded over the next few decades. In London she also became a follower of the suffragette movement, and its more radical leaders such as Christabel Pankhurst.

She returned to South Africa in 1912, and became heavily involved in the causes of non-racialism. She was an extremely talented public speaker and this, together with her confidence and social standing, meant that she was greatly in demand to address public meetings on these causes. Throughout her life she was also a writer for a range of British and South African publications. Emily Hobhouse later wrote of her: "Your gift of seeing into the heart of things is so great, and you have control of such exquisite language for expressing moral and spiritual aspects". In addition, her writings drew considerable attention due to their radical (and often anti-imperialistic) language.

She remained in close contact with the Gandhis, regularly visiting Mr and Mrs Gandhi at Phoenix Settlement, and moved there to join the satyagraha campaign. She bought a cottage nearby at Ohlanga, as a base for her work to support several movements operating from the area, including the Gandhis, and those of early African statesmen such as John Dube. In speeches given with Gandhi at meetings in Durban she urged Indians to identify with Africa. The Gandhis came to Cape Town in 1914 and Miss Molteno worked to facilitate their meetings with the most powerful political figures in South Africa. She also facilitated their introduction to Emily Hobhouse and the Prime Minister himself, General Botha, who had long ignored Gandhi's requests for an interview but thereafter maintained cordial communications. Gandhi was later to write about Miss Molteno's role as "peacemaker", enabling him to make contact with some of the most powerful figures in the country.

In the following years, she joined a range of campaigns in support of political and land rights for Black South Africans, working with prominent Black leaders such as John Dube (first President General of the ANC) and Sol Plaatje.

A particularly important cause for her was the abuse of prisoners at the hands of the South African police force. While Gandhi himself was in prison, she worked with beaten or abused prisoners and testified at inquests. She lobbied against the neglect that Mrs Gandhi also suffered whilst in prison and, in a particularly severe case, visited the imprisoned and badly beaten "satyagrahi" Soorzai, who had been fatally assaulted for supposedly leading a strike. The man died from his injuries, and Miss Molteno became deeply involved in the (ultimately unsuccessful) legal proceedings concerning his treatment.

Elizabeth Molteno was a determined advocate of women's rights, and also became a convert to the movement for women's suffrage in South Africa. In South Africa she worked with female passive resisters of all races and backgrounds. She was also a regular speaker at the movement's meetings, and expressed the hope that in a future multi-racial South Africa, women would be allowed to play a prominent part.

When the First World War broke out in 1914, she joined her close friends Emily Hobhouse and Olive Schreiner in wartime England, to work with conscientious objectors. However, the greater part of her work in the United Kingdom was nonetheless for the less high-profile cause of women's rights and representation. When the Russian Revolution erupted a few years later and World War I drew to a close, a great many people initially thought it the beginning of a great "emancipation of humanity". Miss Molteno was no exception, and in 1919 wrote of her hopes for a future when: “…All distinctions of race, gender, religion; all the old shibboleths hitherto in use to keep down the masses, were to give way to wider, broader and deeper conceptions of humanity”

She died in southern England in 1927 and has been described as possibly “…one of the most influential women in South Africa during the nineteenth and early twentieth centuries.” and as “One of the most remarkable South African women of her generation.” However, many of the values and causes she championed were considered unusually progressive for her time, and it would take decades before they gained wider acceptance, particularly in South Africa. As a result, her role in advancing these ideas was largely forgotten.

== See also ==
- Molteno (disambiguation)
- Sir John Charles Molteno
- Olive Schreiner
- Emily Hobhouse
- South Africa Conciliation Committee
