= The Cape Tercentenary Foundation =

Cultural development fund established in Cape Town, South Africa

- Founded: 1950; 76 years ago
- Founder: Edward; Harry Molteno

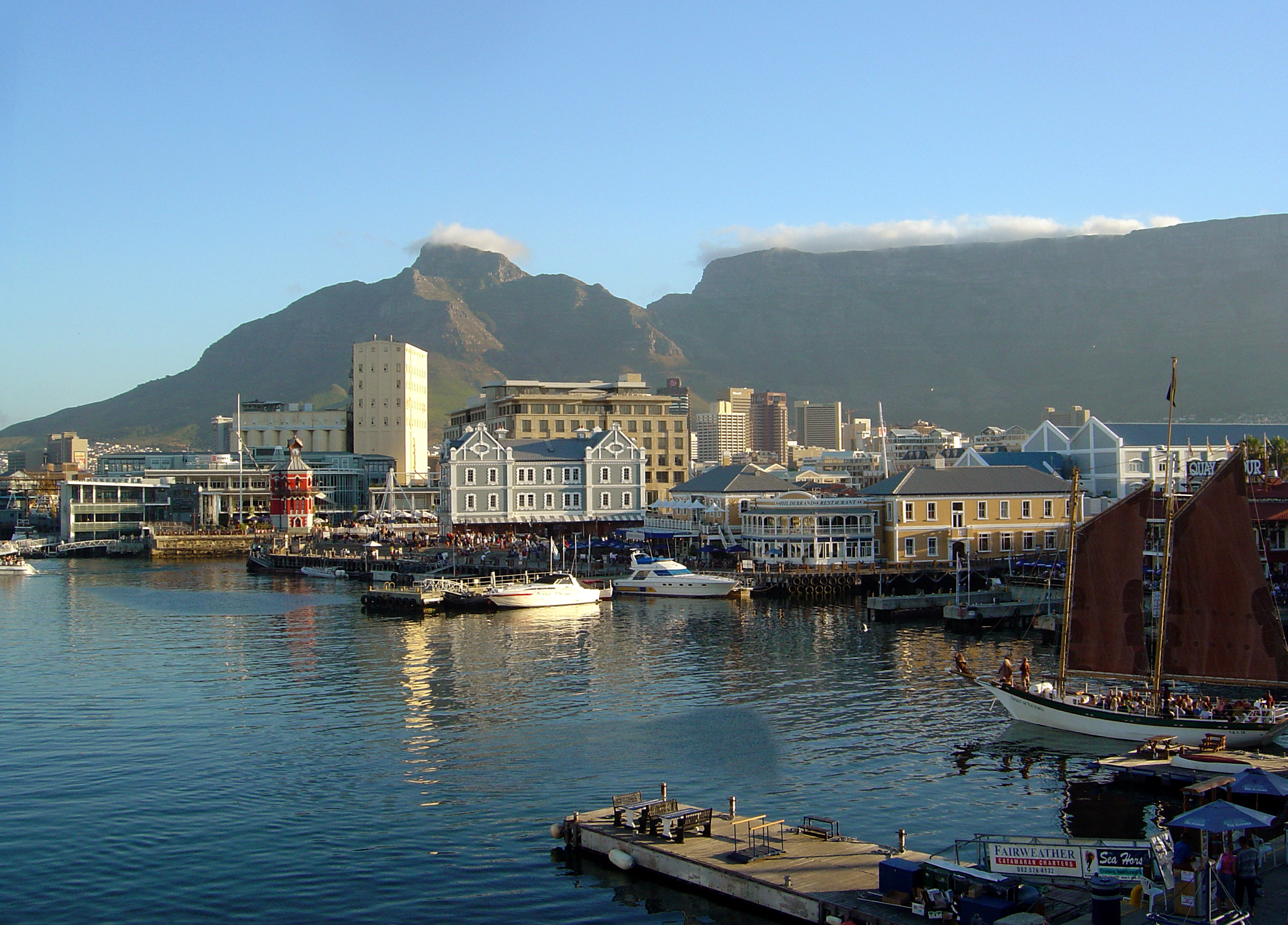
The Cape Tercentenary Foundation was set up as a fund to support the cultural development of the city of Cape Town and its surrounds.

The Cape Tercentenary Foundation (or Cape 300 Foundation) was set up in 1950 by brothers Edward and Harry Molteno, pioneers of the Cape fruit industry. The influential exporters were great appreciators of music and the arts, and were deeply concerned about the natural environment. They therefore wanted to establish "a fund for the cultural development of Cape Town" as well as for environmental causes.

== Projects ==
The stated mission of the Cape 300 Foundation is to preserve, promote and encourage literature, the visual and performing arts, and the natural and cultural environment in the Cape.

Projects of the Foundation include scholarships and bursaries (especially post-graduate or doctoral), equipment and grants for needy schools and students, public libraries, heritage trusts, publication subsidies, orchestras and music societies, environmental organisations (such as the Botanical Society of South Africa and SANCCOB), educational workshops and other community projects.

== Awards ==
The actions and achievements of individuals or organisations that further the aims and objectives of the Foundation are recognized by awarding the Molteno Medal, which was first struck in 2000 to mark the 50th year of the Foundation and remembers its founders, Edward and Harry Molteno.

== Funding ==
The foundation receives continued support from the Molteno Trust but financial assistance is open to all. Donations to the foundation go to fund projects such as study grants, publication subsidies and the preservation of the built or natural environments.
