= Molteno Pass =

- Moltenopas
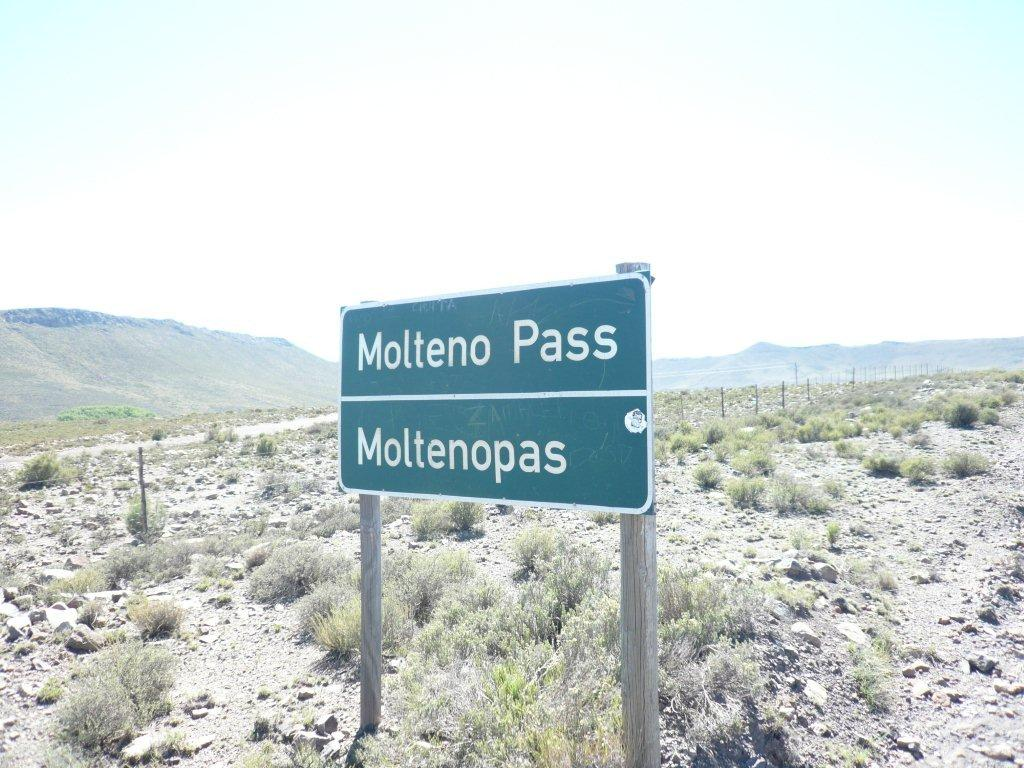

- Location within Western Cape
- Elevation: 1,574 metres (5,164 ft)

Third Approach
- Location: Western Cape, South Africa
- Range: Nuweveld Mountains
- Coordinates: 32°13′6″S 22°33′7″E
- Topo map: 35

Molteno Pass is a mountain pass in the Western Cape province of South Africa.

== History ==
It is considered to be South Africa's first mountain pass. It was built to cross the great Nuweveld Mountain Range, thus connecting the central Karoo and its oldest town Beaufort West, to the vast expanse of the Northern Cape.

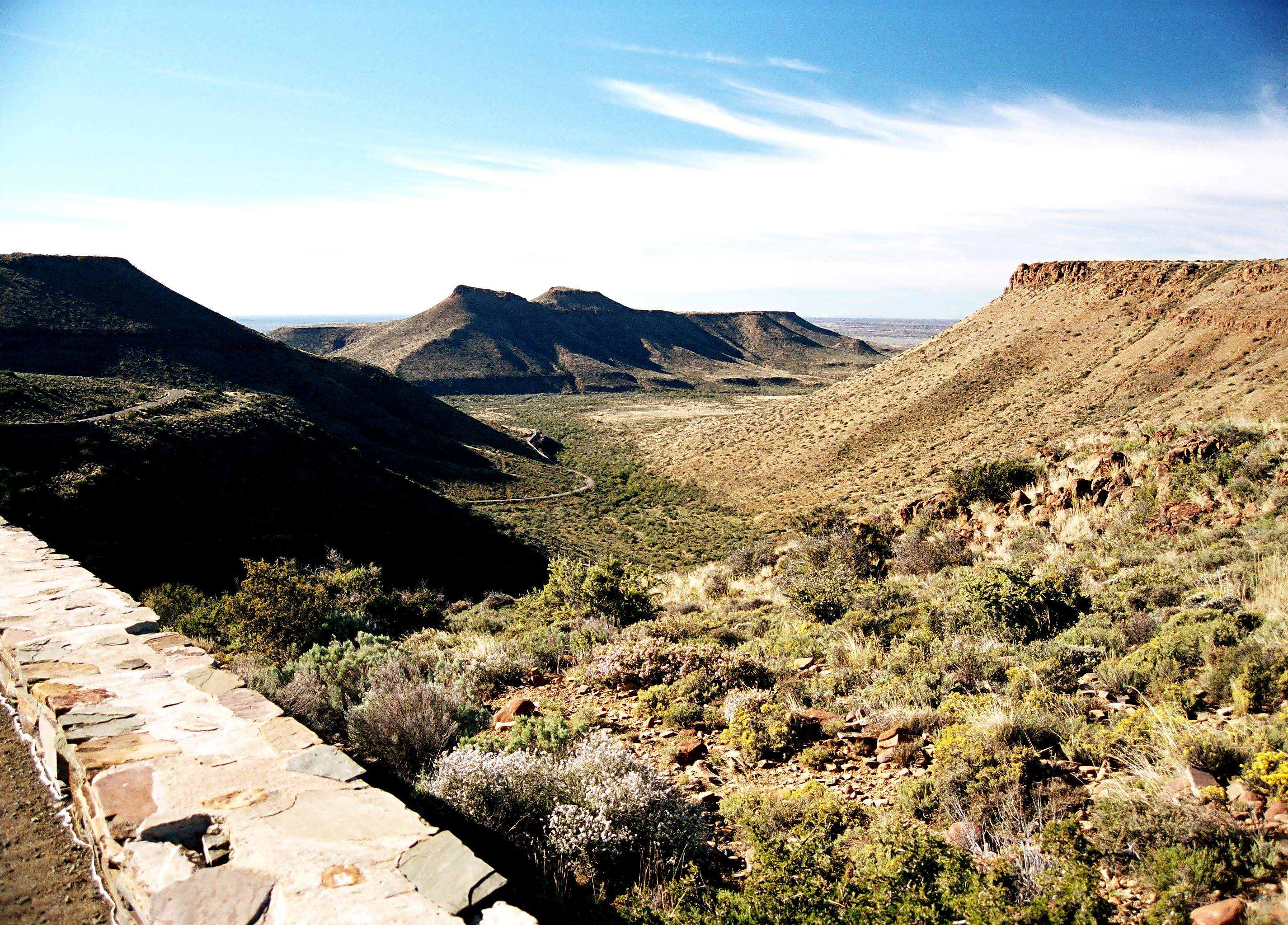
View from the Nuweveld Mountains, towards the Karoo plateau in the distance

It was completed in May 1881, and named after a local entrepreneur and farmer John Molteno who was instrumental in the area's upliftment and development in the 1800s. He also represented the region in parliament and went on to become the Cape's first Prime Minister.

== Location ==
The pass forms part of the R381, between Beaufort West in the Western Cape and Loxton in the Northern Cape. On its route it passes the Karoo National Park.
