= Magdalena Sauer =

South African architect

- Born: 6 May 1890; Kenilworth, Cape Town
- Died: 10 October 1983 (aged 93)
- Citizenship: South Africa
- Education: University of Cape Town
- Occupation: Architect
- Father: Jacobus Wilhelmus Sauer
- Family: Paul Oliver Sauer

Magdalena Sauer (6 May 1890 – 10 October 1983) was the first woman qualified to practice as an architect in South Africa.

== Early life and education ==
Magdalena Gertruide Sauer was born in Kenilworth, Cape Town, the daughter of Jacobus Wilhelmus Sauer and Mary Cloete Sauer. Her father was a prominent politician, and her mother was a close friend of author Olive Schreiner. Her brother, Paul Oliver Sauer, also became a politician; the nationalist Sauer Commission was named for him. She was raised in Kenilworth and at the family farm near Stellenbosch. She attended the University of Cape Town, earning a degree in science in 1911. She pursued further training in architecture as a trainee in Durban, and in England at the Architectural Association School of Architecture in London.

== Career ==
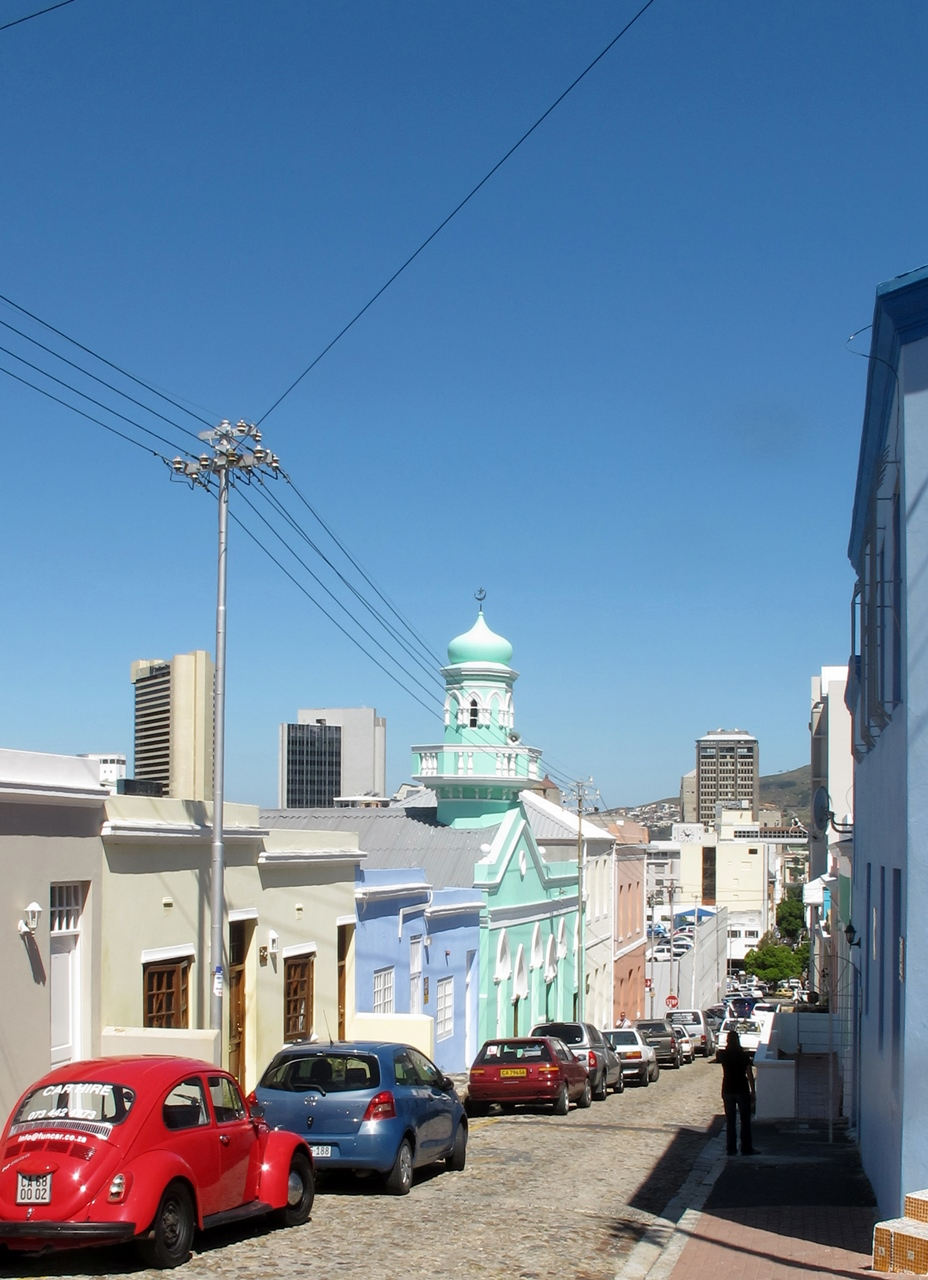
Cape Town Bo-Kaap 188 to 200 Longmarket St with Mosque; several of the buildings in this photograph were restored by Magda Sauer in the 1940s

After she finished her architectural training, she registered with the Institute of South African Architects in 1927. She was hired by Frederick Man to design the Andros Hotel in 1928 in the Cape Dutch Revival style. This is now known as The Claremont Boutique Hotel. Thereafter she focused as residential architecture and restoration of older buildings. Among her projects were the restoration of buildings on Shortmarket, Longmarket, Rose, and Chiappini Streets in Cape Town's Bo-Kaap (then called the Malay Quarter) in the 1940s (with Reg de Smit), and creating the South African Cultural History Museum from the former Supreme Court building in the 1960s (the building has housed the Slave Lodge museum since 1998). She retired from architectural work in 1965. Both projects have since been declared protected historical sites.

As a side occupation, Sauer wrote art criticism for Die Burger newspaper.

== Personal life ==
She married once, briefly, to Trygve Strömsöe, the Norwegian engineer who designed the Table Mountain Aerial Cableway. Their daughter Karin Strömsöe, born 1924, became an artist and book illustrator. Magdalena Sauer died in 1983, aged 93 years.
