= Vincent Barkly Molteno =

Vice-Admiral Vincent Barkly Molteno CB
- Born: 30 April 1872; Cape Town, Cape Colony
- Died: 12 November 1952 (aged 80); Surrey, England
- Military career
- Allegiance: United Kingdom
- Branch: Royal Navy
- Service years: 1885–1921
- Rank: Vice-Admiral
- Commands: HMS Warrior; HMS Revenge; HMS Antrim; HMS King George V; HMS Shannon; HMS Minotaur; HMS Bellerophon
- Conflicts: First World War
- Awards: Order of St. Anna; Companion of the Order of the Bath

Vice-Admiral Vincent Barkly Molteno CB (30 April 1872 – 12 November 1952) was a Royal Navy officer during World War I.

He fought and distinguished himself in the Battle of Jutland in April 1916, commanding from the armoured cruiser HMS Warrior. He was subsequently awarded the Russian Order of St. Anna for bravery, and was appointed Companion of the Order of the Bath and Aide-de-camp to the King.

== Early life ==
Molteno was born in Cape Town, then part of the Cape Colony, into a large family of Italian origin. He was the son of Sir John Charles Molteno, who at the time was Prime Minister of the Cape, and many of his relatives held positions of influence in business and government. Vincent Molteno had little interest in business though. His father died when he was 14 years old; he left the colony to enter the Royal Navy as a cadet.

Soon after joining the Navy, he was discovered to be a lethally accurate shot, was selected for special training, and quickly distinguished as a gun specialist. In 1893 he was sent to take part in the Vitu Expedition to Zanzibar as a lieutenant to crush the slave trade, and was awarded the General African Medal. His extraordinary effectiveness on this mission was repeatedly reported in despatches, and led to his being promoted to Commander.

== World War I ==
He commanded several warships in World War I, including HMS Revenge, Antrim, King George V, Shannon, Minotaur, and Bellerophon. It was from Revenge (also after she was renamed HMS Redoubtable) that he successfully led the bombardment of German bases along the Flanders coast. He also served as Flag-Captain of the 2nd Battle Squadron and the 3rd Cruiser Squadron.

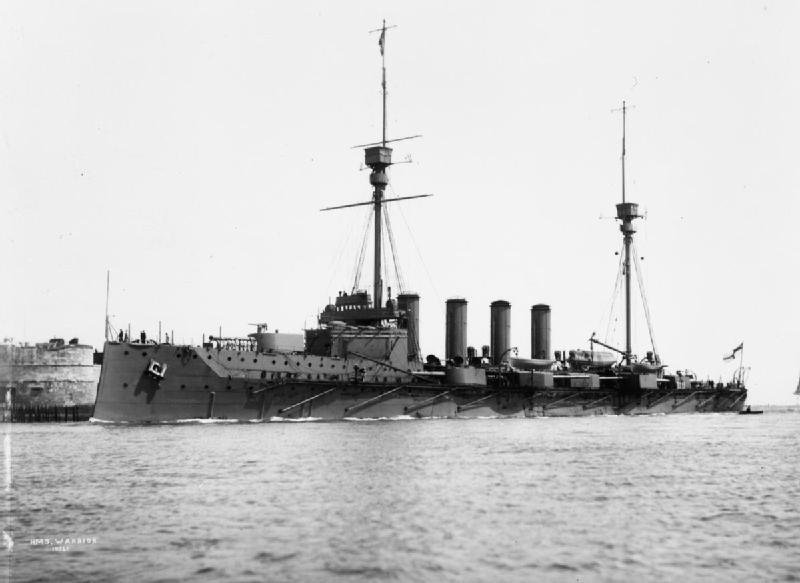
Armoured cruiser HMS Warrior (1905)

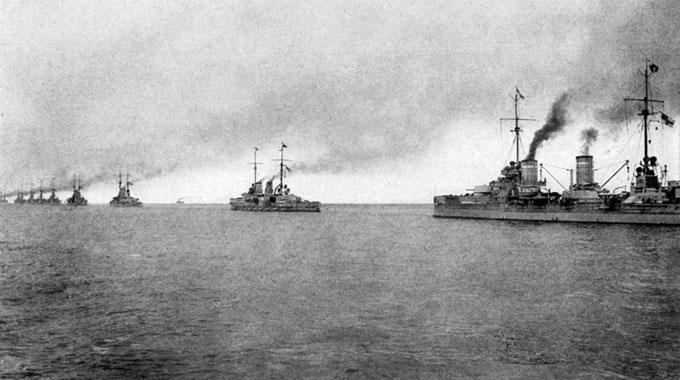
Dreadnoughts of the High Seas Fleet

Molteno fought at the Battle of Jutland, the largest naval engagement of the First World War, commanding from the armoured cruiser HMS Warrior. HMS Warrior was part of the ill-fated First Cruiser Squadron, which was deployed as a vanguard several miles ahead of the main British fleet.

When contact was first made with the German High Seas Fleet, Rear-Admiral Arbuthnot boldly but unwisely ordered the First Cruiser Squadron to engage, and the small squadron thus found itself facing the combined firepower of the German dreadnoughts. The last two ships of the squadron were unable to join up with the admiral and avoided the HSF. HMS Duke of Edinburgh survived the battle but HMS Black Prince was destroyed by German Dreadnoughts during the night action. . (Admiral Arbuthnot himself died when his ship was obliterated with all 903 hands, within minutes of the engagement beginning.)

HMS Warrior fought on, exchanging fire with the combined line of German dreadnoughts for a considerable time. While able to manoeuvre somewhat to minimise the damage, Warrior was nevertheless taking hits from 11 in (280 mm) and 5.9 in (150 mm) shells, and beginning to suffer large fires and massive carnage on deck. With casualties mounting and signs of flooding, Molteno manoeuvred Warrior out of harm's way as the beleaguered HMS Warspite unintentionally drew the enemy fire. Once out of danger, Molteno had the heavily damaged ship taken in tow, and the crew were safely landed (08:25, 1 June) before the ship was finally discarded and allowed to sink the next day.

He was awarded the Order of St. Anna with Swords for his exceptional performance at the battle. A newspaper from the time reports,

The Warrior went through terrible experiences. At one time the concentrated fire of the German Dreadnoughts fell upon her; the Defence and Black Prince were blown up beside her. Captain Molteno's ship suffered about 100 casualties. The wounded and the rest of the crew were all saved when she was in a sinking condition after being in tow for several hours. The gallant captain was cheered by the ship's company when they were all safely landed.

— The SA Newspaper, 10 June 1916, page 456

Molteno then led attacks on German forces that were covering convoys in the North Sea, commanding from HMS Shannon, and when hostilities ended he was appointed aide-de-camp to the King and was appointed Companion of the Order of the Bath. He retired in 1921 as rear-admiral but was promoted to vice-admiral in 1926 while on the retired list. He died on 12 November 1952 aged 80.

== Family life ==
Molteno married Ethel Manwaring Robertson in 1915, and they had one daughter Viola born in 1917. Ethel had been married twice before, firstly to George Batley in 1895 and then James Swanston in 1901.
