= Bisset Berry =

Scottish-born South African politician

Sir William Bisset Berry KC
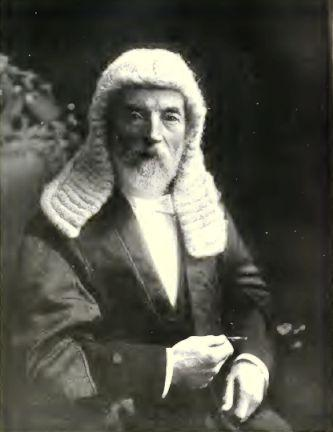

4th Speaker of the Cape House of Assembly
- In office 1899–1907
- Monarchs: Queen Victoria; Edward VII
- Prime Minister: William Philip Schreiner; John Gordon Sprigg
- Preceded by: Henry Juta
- Succeeded by: James Molteno

Personal details
- Born: 26 July 1839 Aberdeen, Scotland
- Died: 8 June 1922 (aged 82) Queenstown, Eastern Cape, Cape Province, Union of South Africa
- Occupation: Politician; Surgeon
- Profession: Surgeon

Sir William Bisset Berry KC (26 July 1839 – 8 June 1922) was a Scots-born South African politician and the fourth Speaker of the Legislative Assembly of the Cape Colony.

== Early life ==
Born in Aberdeen, Scotland, he was the son of James Berry. He graduated M.A. at Marischal College in 1858, and M.D. in 1861. Bisset Berry came to the Cape Colony in 1864 as a ship's surgeon and settled in Queenstown, Eastern Cape. His engagement to Agnes Baden-Powell was announced in The Illustrated London News of 27 April 1901, but they never married.

== Politics ==
He later became Queenstown's mayor and was elected as its representative in the Cape Parliament in 1894.

== Speaker of the Cape Parliament ==
Although he hated publicity, Berry was an engaging public speaker and a skilled debater. When there was a vacancy for the position of Speaker of Parliament, he was elected unopposed in 1898, even though he had only 4 years of parliamentary experience and his command of the Afrikaans language was small. He lamented his inexperience and lack of qualifications, but showed himself to be decisive and firm when necessary. He presided over the votes of no confidence in Sprigg's government and the application of martial law in the Cape Colony. In 1902, he distinguished himself with his strong opposition to the attempt by the British Colonial Office to suspend the Cape constitution.

Berry sought re-election in 1908, but was not returned to office (only being re-elected as an ordinary member in the 1910 election). The young James Molteno was elected to replace him as Speaker.

== See also ==
- Speaker of the South African National Assembly

Political offices
Preceded by John Frost, CMG	Member of the Legislative Assembly for Queenstown; 1894–1907	Succeeded by ???
Preceded by Sir Henry Juta	Speaker of the Legislative Assembly of the Cape Colony; 1899–1907	Succeeded by James Molteno
