= Jacobus Wilhelmus Sauer =

Liberal politician of the Cape Colony

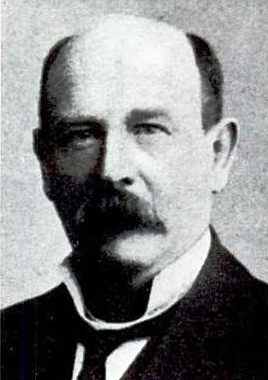

Jacobus Wilhelmus ("J.W.") Sauer (1850 – 24 July 1913), was a prominent liberal politician of the Cape Colony. He served as Minister in multiple Cape governments, and was influential in several unsuccessful attempts to enshrine equal political rights for black South Africans in the constitution of the Union of South Africa. He was also a strong early supporter of women's rights and suffrage.

== Government service in the Cape Colony ==
Little is known about Jacobus Sauer's early life. He was the son of a landdrost in the Orange Free State, and attended South African College School before practicing as an attorney for several years in Cape Town.

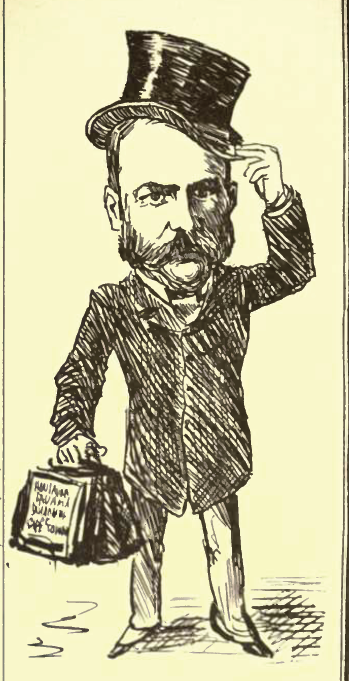
"Government Sauer", here caricatured in the 1880s.

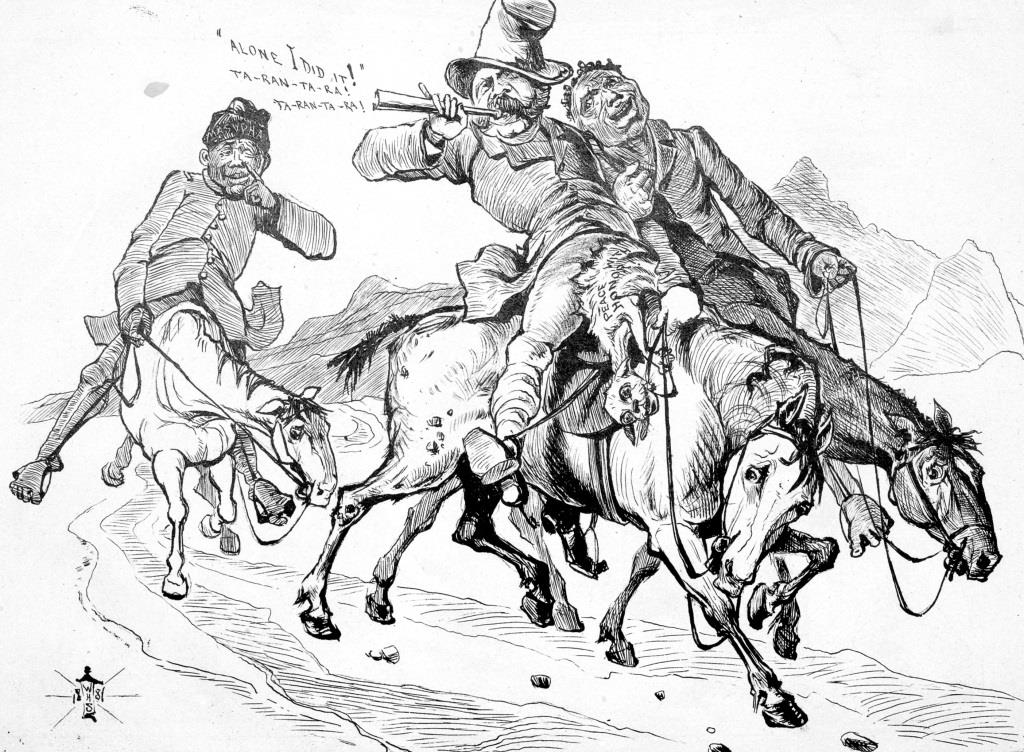
Sauer was already being criticised in the 1880s by the right-wing press for his liberal views. Here the radically imperialist Lantern newspaper attacks his work in Basutoland under the title "When Jamie Comes Marching Home!"

He was first elected to the Parliament of the Cape of Good Hope under the Molteno Ministry in 1875 to represent the constituency of Aliwal North, and served continuously until 1904. He was then re-elected to serve from 1908 until his death. In total, he sat in the Cape Parliament for over twenty years. At the beginning of his career, he was greatly influenced by the pragmatic and racially inclusive policies of early Cape parliamentarians such as Saul Solomon, and he adhered to the principles of this "Cape Liberal Tradition" for the remainder of his life.

The Cape Colony had recently acquired a sizable Xhosa population in its expanding frontiers. Initially, due to their inaccessibility in the remote frontier mountains, most rural Xhosa people of the Cape failed to register as voters. In the 1880s, Sauer engaged himself in an intense campaign to mobilise and register the Xhosa voters, who light-heartedly dubbed him with the nickname of "Government Sauer". In 1883, he invited the Xhosa politician and journalist John Tengo Jabavu to stand for Parliament in Cape Town, but Jabavu declined.

Sauer was also a strong supporter of women's suffrage and the local Cape Women's Enfranchisement League. On 4 July 1907, together with fellow MPs Dr Antonie Viljoen and James Molteno, he supported the Cape's first parliamentary attempt to give women of all races the vote.

As a politician he was described as "solid, cautious and well-balanced", and although English was not his mother-tongue, he was described as a strong and forceful orator. His lifelong political alliance with John X. Merriman led to them being dubbed as "political Siamese twins", with Sauer's down-to-earth practicality complementing Merriman's erratic excitability.

Sauer was a minister in the governments of the Prime Ministers Thomas Scanlen (1881–84), Cecil Rhodes (1890–93), W P Schreiner, (1898-1900), J X Merriman (1908-1910), and in the national government after union.

In 1876, early on in his political career, he broke with Prime Minister Gordon Sprigg after taking issue with Sprigg's discriminatory "native policy". However he returned to government in 1881 as "Secretary for Native Affairs" in the cabinet of Prime Minister Thomas Scanlen.

He was invited to form a government after Sprigg's second Ministry collapsed in 1890, but declined.

== Opposition to Rhodes and leadership of the South African Party ==
Sauer was appointed to serve as Colonial Secretary in Cecil Rhodes's Ministry, but after the "Logan Scandal" in 1893 revealed the degree of corruption in Rhodes's business dealings, he left Rhodes's cabinet and, with help from several powerful political allies, brought down Rhodes's government. Though Rhodes succeeded in reforming his government, Sauer consolidated the liberal opposition to Rhodes as the new "South African Party", which among other things stood for free trade, multiracial government, compulsory education and an excise. Sauer was elected as the party's first leader.

He opposed Rhodes for the rest of his career, with the powerful support of John X. Merriman and John Tengo Jabavu, and made no secret of his opposition to the "Imperial interest" in the Cape Colony. Together with Merriman and future parliamentary speaker James Molteno, he even attempted to abolish the rights of Rhodes's Chartered Company. He famously attacked Rhodes in 1894 for Rhodes's statement that the Xhosa were to be treated as "poor children", unfit for franchise.

== Anglo-Boer War ==
At the time of the Second Boer War, Sauer was accused of fermenting pro-Boer sentiment among the Cape Dutch, though in fact he repeatedly tried to persuade his constituents to abstain from the ongoing struggle against British rule. His brother however, was convicted of being a rebel for the Boer cause and imprisoned.

In early 1901, Sauer travelled to London with fellow Cape politician John X. Merriman to persuade the British government not to make war on the South African Republic (Transvaal) and Orange Free State. As Afrikaners themselves, they were nevertheless dismissed as being natural supporters of the Boer Republics. The House of Commons refused them a hearing, and the public meetings that they held were disrupted by increasingly large numbers of imperial demonstrators. Their gathering for peace in June 1901 at Queen's Hall was attacked by a particularly violent crowd of protesters, and the campaign was a failure.

Having lost his parliamentary seat in 1904, he regained it when Merriman became Prime Minister of the Cape in 1908, and he was invited to join Merriman's government.

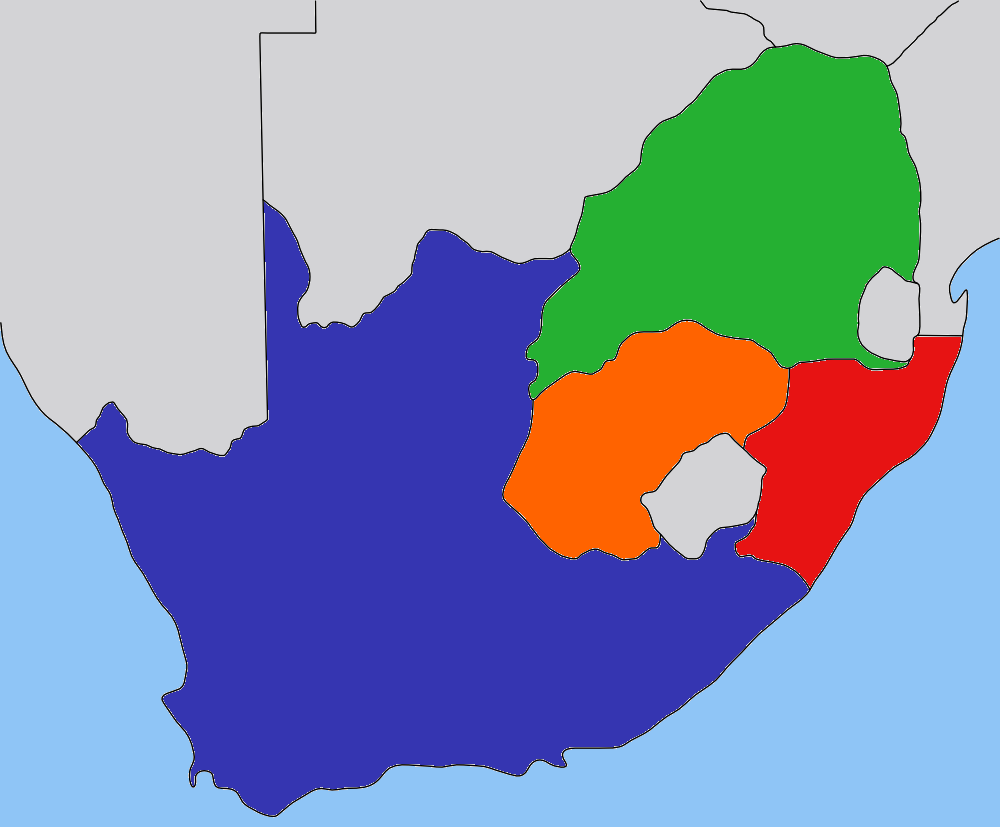
The states of Southern Africa, before Union; with the Cape Colony coloured blue, Natal red, Transvaal green and the Orange Free state orange

== The Union of South Africa ==
Sauer served as a delegate for the Cape Colony at the National Convention for the proposed Union of South Africa in 1908. Here he joined Merriman, and his old friend the powerful politician and businessman Percy Molteno, in advocating a non-racial franchise in the constitution. The concept was bitterly opposed by the representatives of the other South African colonies and their exclusively white electorate; Sauer later proposed the extension of the qualified Cape franchise to the rest of the Union. When this was also rejected, he successfully fought for the retention of this system in the Cape only. While some of his allies thought this compromise "pathetic", Sauer believed it was the only way to retain a semblance of political voice for nonwhites, without scuppering the entire Union. Sauer was also under the mistaken belief that the existing franchise could later be extended and expanded after union had been secured. He nonetheless viewed the results of the Union Convention as a great disappointment. He later declined the offer of a knighthood for his services to the Cape Colony.

After union he served as Minister of Railways and Harbors in the first South African national government, and as Minister of Justice for the remaining years of his life. He died in 1913, survived by his wife, Mary Sauer (née Cloete), and his three children. His daughter Magdalena Sauer became the first woman qualified to practice as an architect in South Africa; his son Paul Sauer became a politician; the nationalist Sauer Commission was named for him.

== Winemaker ==
Sauer purchased the famous Kanonkop Wine Estate, which he left to his son Paul.

== See also ==
- William Philip Schreiner

Political offices
Preceded by Joseph Orpen	Representative for Aliwal North; 1875–1904	Succeeded by Col. Charles Preston Crewe
Preceded by William Ayliff	Secretary for Native Affairs of the Cape Colony; 1881–1884	Succeeded by J.A. de Wet
Preceded by H.W. Pearson	Colonial Secretary of the Cape Colony; 1890–1893	Succeeded by P.H. Faure
Preceded by James Sivewright	Commissioner of Public Works of the Cape Colony; 1898–1900	Succeeded by T.W. Smartt
Preceded by Col. Charles Preston Crewe	Representative for Aliwal North; 1908–1913	Succeeded by ???
Preceded by T.W. Smartt	Commissioner of Public Works of the Cape Colony; 1908–1910	Succeeded by Office ended with Union
Preceded by Office created	Minister of Railways and Harbors of South Africa; 1910–1912	Succeeded by Henry Burton
Preceded by J. B. M. Hertzog	Minister of Justice of South Africa; 1912–1913	Succeeded by Nicolaas Jacobus de Wet
