= James Tennant Molteno =

South African Barrister and Parliamentarian

Sir James Molteno
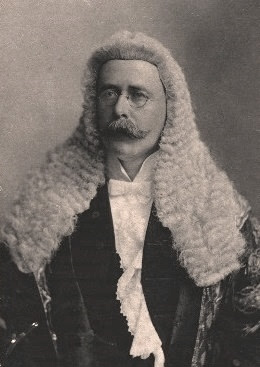
- Molteno as Parliamentary Speaker.

Speaker of the Cape House of Assembly
- In office 1908–1910
- Monarch: Edward VII
- Prime Minister: John X. Merriman
- Preceded by: Sir William Bisset Berry
- Succeeded by: Office ended with Union

1st Speaker of the South African National Assembly
- In office 1910–1915
- Monarch: George V
- Prime Minister: Louis Botha
- Preceded by: Position Established
- Succeeded by: Joel Krige

Personal details
- Born: 5 January 1865 Cape Town, Cape Colony
- Died: 16 September 1936 (aged 71) London, United Kingdom
- Education: Trinity College, Cambridge
- Profession: Barrister, Speaker of Parliament

Sir James Molteno (5 January 1865 – 16 September 1936), was an influential barrister and parliamentarian of South Africa.

Rising to prominence as an unconventional anti-imperialist, he was briefly opposition leader, before becoming parliamentary Speaker.

He was the last Speaker for the Parliament of the Cape Colony, and the first Speaker of Parliament of South Africa.

== Early life ==
The son of Prime Minister Sir John Molteno, James was born on 5 January 1865 at his family's Claremont estate. He matriculated with honours from Diocesan College and read law at Trinity College, Cambridge, where he was noted not just for his academic diligence but for his unusual strength and physical fitness (An extremely athletic man, he excelled in sports from horseracing and boxing to swimming and shooting).

He was elected first president of the Trinity College Debating Society and was active on the committee of the Union. Otherwise he divided his time at university between frenzied study, and backpacking around Europe attending drunken parties with fellow students. He also acquired a passion for card-playing that remained with him for the rest of his life.

When he graduated with honours he was called to the Inner Temple in London, before returning to Cape Town to become an Advocate of the Supreme Court in 1889.

== Political career ==
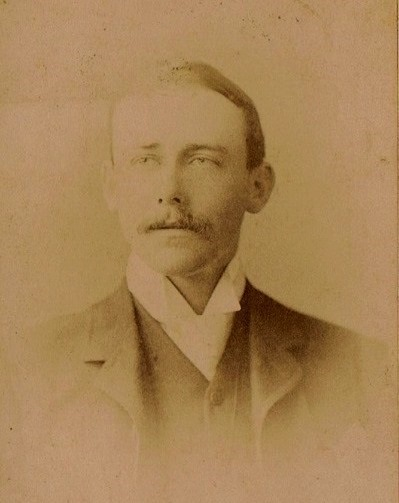
James Molteno as a young MP in the 1890s.

Molteno entered the Cape Parliament in 1890, at the age of 25, and became Speaker of Parliament in 1908. He was in fact to be the last speaker before the Cape Parliament dissolved itself on the act of Union.

=== Early parliamentary career (1890–1899) ===
He was initially a supporter of Prime Minister Cecil John Rhodes, but after the "Logan Scandal" in 1893 revealed the degree of corruption in Rhodes's business dealings, Molteno left his government and immediately joined the opposition. From then on he became increasingly suspicious of Rhodes for what he considered his unscrupulous craving for power.

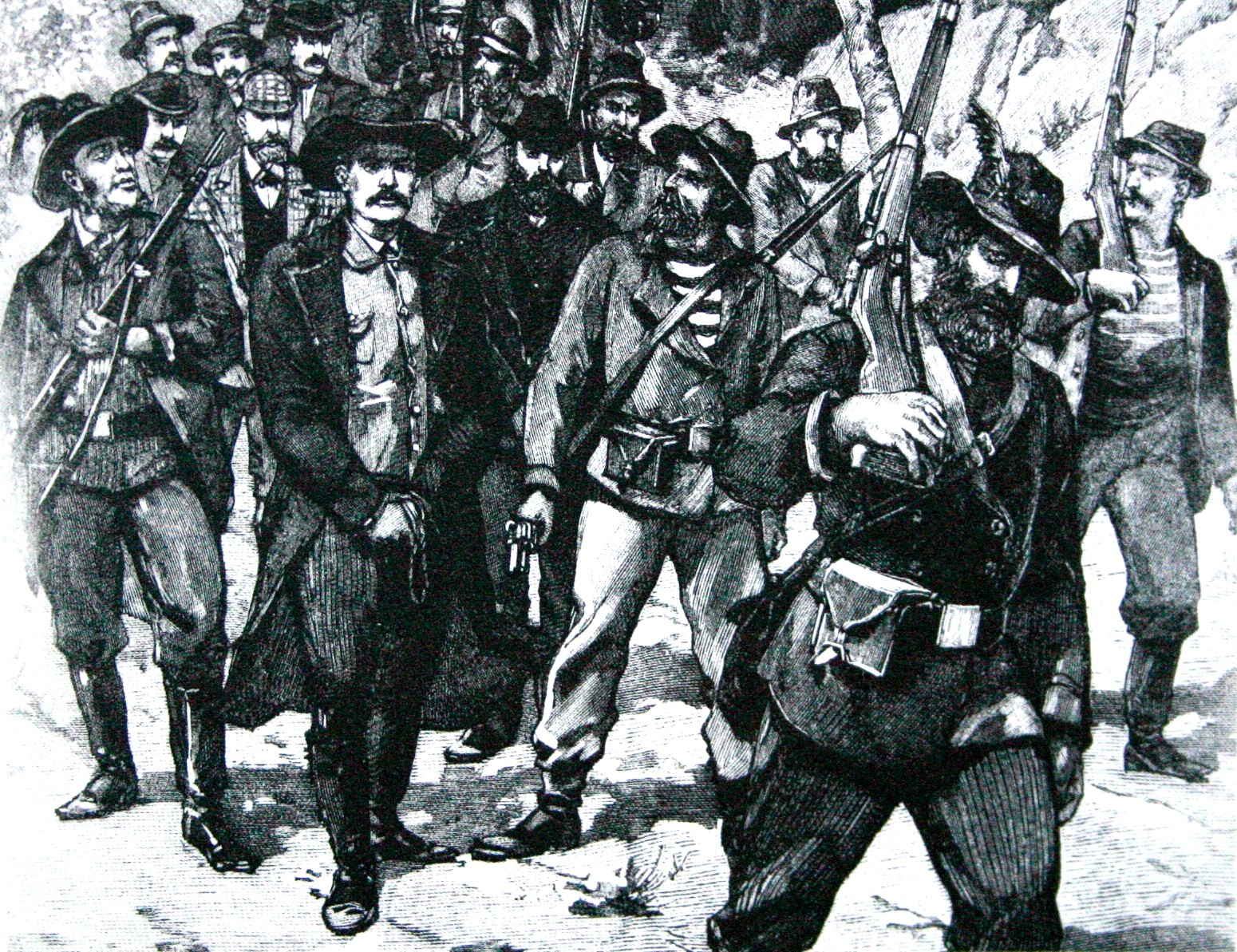
Capture of Leander Starr Jameson by the Boers, after his failed 1896 raid. The raid turned out to have been secretly engineered by Cecil Rhodes – a fact known by Molteno from the beginning.

When the Jameson Raid took place, Molteno immediately accused Rhodes of engineering it, calling Leander Starr Jameson a "fool". He wrote that the raid was the beginning of the divide between Boer and British that would eventually culminate in the Boer War.

In 1899, he organised and chaired a commission to draw up a petition to Queen Victoria, from anti-War politicians and intellectuals of Southern Africa, stressing the seriousness of the impending conflict. It included key information that was not disclosed to London by the British High Commissioner in South Africa, Sir Alfred Milner, who was intent on taking the Cape to war. Consequently Milner avoided delivering it. Molteno then used his family connections to take the petition – as well as Milner's private statements on his warlike intentions – to the British press and parliament, causing great embarrassment to Milner and the Colonial establishment in South Africa.

Molteno was an exceptionally skilled debater and public speaker. In parliament however, he quickly gained a reputation as a jovial tease, with an uncanny ability to both foment and soothe disagreements in the house – while all the time taking an amused backseat. His friends and colleagues in parliament gave him the nickname "Baby Molteno", as he was the youngest of his extended family to be politically active at the time.

=== The Boer War and its aftermath (1899–1908) ===
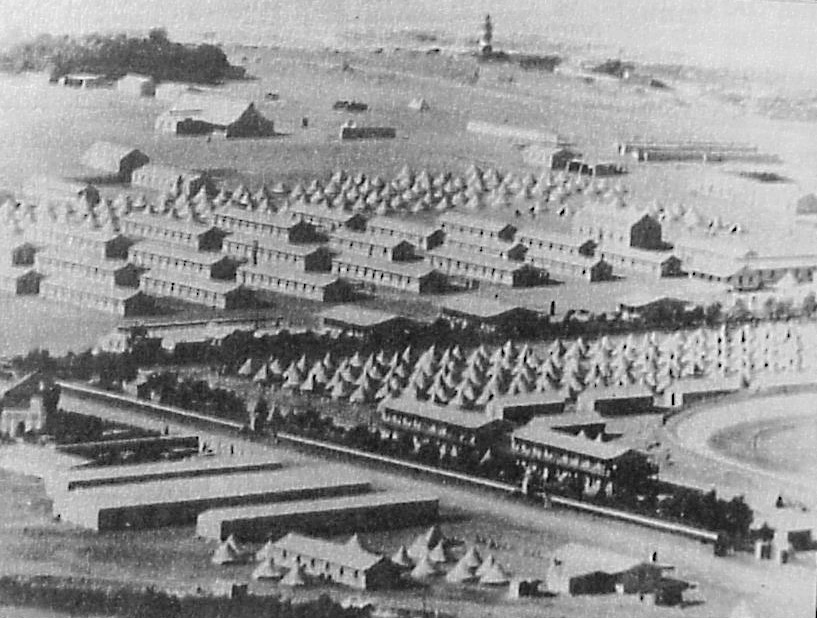
Anglo-Boer War prisoner transit camp on Green point common, Cape Town.

When War broke out, Molteno chaired the anti-war South Africa Conciliation Committee in Cape Town. Like his brother (and fellow MP) John Molteno Jr., he was a fierce critic of the malpractices that took place in the Cape under British martial law, and regularly smuggled evidence of them out of the country via his family connections, to sympathetic MPs in the British House of Commons. In fact, on many occasions he recklessly flouted martial law, seemingly without fear of repercussions, possibly because of the influence of these same connections.

He even went so far as to act as the legal counsel for the so-called "Cape rebels", successfully defending them from the charge of high treason in a series of high-profile military tribunals set up across the country, over a period of 2 years. He then joined several other powerful politicians in successfully fighting the attempt to suspend the Cape's constitution, managing once again to bypass martial law and travel to the Imperial Conference in London to do so.

When democratic government finally resumed in 1902 and Molteno cheerfully re-entered parliament, his arrival provoked a storm of controversy. Some parliamentarians hailed him as a hero; others saw him as a type of terrorist. After his first move of supporting an inquiry into the excesses of military rule, he went on to chair a number of committees and was at the centre of the work to re-establish parliamentary governance.

As a leader of the opposition, his outspoken criticism and sharp repartee was a constant thorn in the side of the Jameson government. At this time, as the next election (1907/8) was approaching, Molteno was exceptionally active and led nationwide campaigns for the election of his old friend and liberal ally John X. Merriman, making hundreds of speeches across the country. The effort paid off and the election was a resounding victory for Merriman and Molteno's "South African Party".

Molteno was a strong proponent of women's suffrage and, on 4 July 1907, together with fellow MPs J.W. Sauer and Dr Antonie Viljoen, made the first parliamentary attempt to give women (of all races) the right to vote, in the last session before the new government. In the long and bitter parliamentary debate that ensued, which Molteno later described as the most painful of his career, Merriman himself joined the parliamentary majority in opposing women's suffrage and the motion was eventually defeated.

=== Speaker of the Cape Colony Parliament (1908–1910) ===
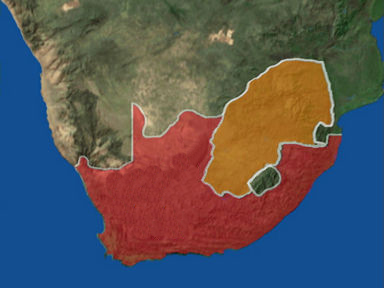
Map of southern Africa just prior to Union. The Cape Colony is shaded red, the Boer republics orange.

After the elections of 1908, when the Merriman government came to power, Molteno was the unanimous choice as Speaker.

As Speaker of Parliament, Molteno abandoned his jovially anarchic style of politics, and became solemn and decisive. With the political storms of the Boer War and the upcoming Union, controlling Parliamentary procedure was a challenge. The Cape House had also more than doubled in size since its creation and was considerably more politically diverse. It was therefore essential to wield a firm and detached authority over sessions that were often very raucous. However, remaining aloof and serious seemed to have sometimes been a challenge for Molteno. Parliamentary writer Ralph Kilpin found the contradictory Speaker rather amusing, and described in his book, The Old Cape House, how Molteno once firmly silenced disruptive parliamentarians who were roaring with laughter in the backbenches, only to whisper audibly to the culprit as he passed the Speaker's seat later: "You can tell me the joke afterwards"

In 1909, at the Prime Minister's request, he joined the South African delegation as legal adviser, and submitted the draft South Africa Act at the National Convention in London. This was in spite of his voicing considerable problems with many of its provisions, particularly those pertaining to franchise.

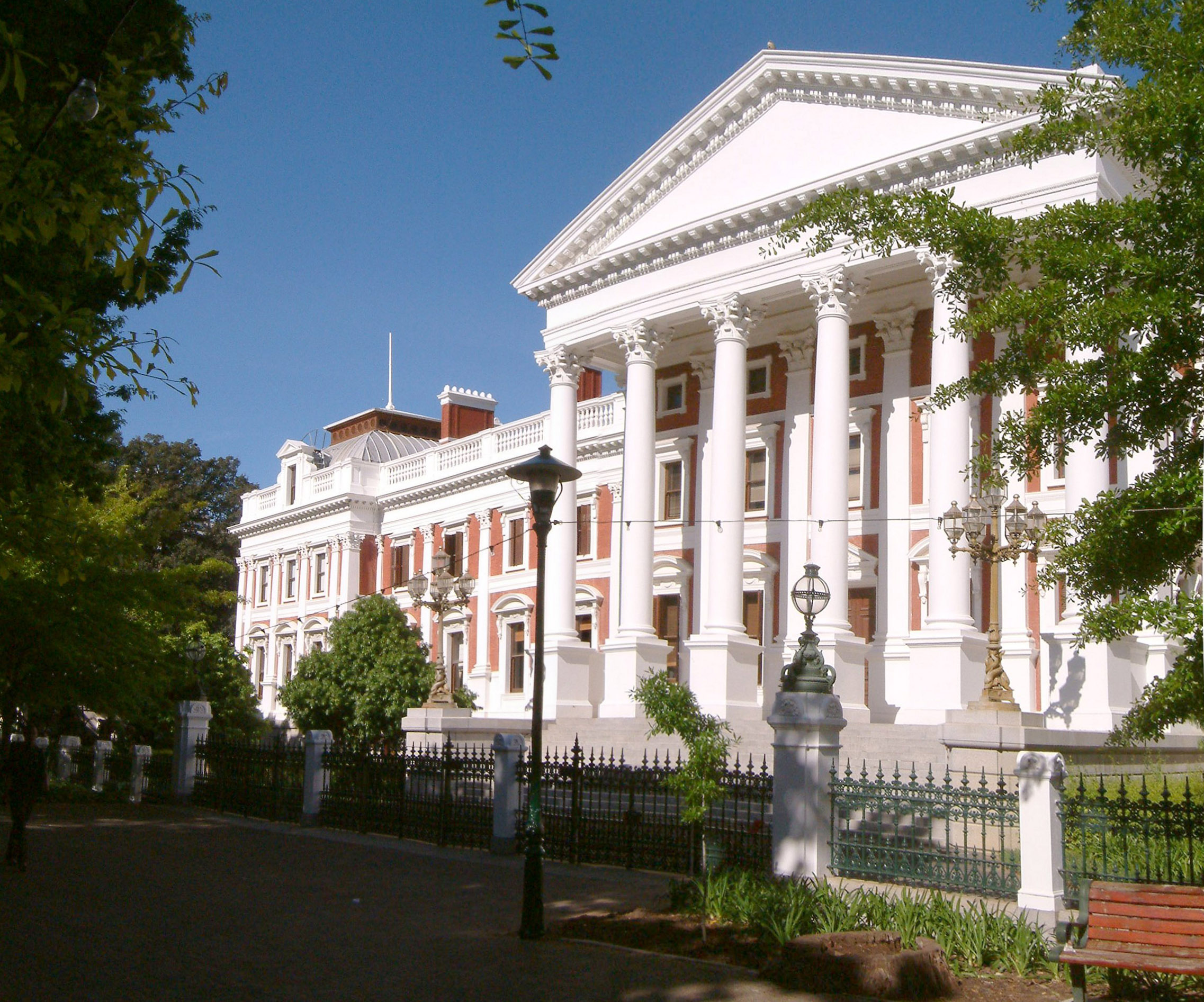
The South African Parliament building in Cape Town

=== First Speaker of the South African Parliament (1910–1915) ===
Nevertheless, when the new Union House of Assembly was created, Molteno, now representing the constituency of Ceres, was asked to take up his office again, having defeated the Transvaal's candidate for Speaker, General C.F. Beyers. He thus became the first Speaker of the South African Parliament. In the ensuing year, he was responsible for compiling the initial rules of procedure for Parliament, as well as the constitution of the Empire Parliamentary Association, of which he was president.

In 1911, he led the South African Parliamentary Delegation to London for the coronation of King George V. He was knighted in the same year.

== High Commissioner for South Africa and later life ==
He resigned from Parliament in 1915, after 25 years, and served briefly as the High Commissioner for the Union of South Africa, in London. Upon his final retirement, he moved to Elgin, outside Cape Town, where much of his extended family lived. Here he settled down to write two racy volumes on the political life of the Cape, a collection of rather random trivia and recollections, and a protracted denouncement of Rhodes, Milner and other imperial figures which he claimed was a warning to South Africa of its future direction. He was also marginally involved in the highly successful syndicate that his family ran on South Africa's agricultural exports, dominated at the time by his oldest brother John.

Known as an eccentric (never seen without his umbrella), he spent his last years on his farm and died on 16 September 1936 while on a visit to Europe. He was survived by his wife, Clare (Clarissa Celia Holland-Pryor), and his four children.

== See also ==
- Parliament of South Africa
- Speaker of the National Assembly of South Africa
- Union of South Africa
- Sir John Charles Molteno
- Molteno (disambiguation)

Political offices
Preceded by Charles Lewis, MLA	Representative of Namaqualand; 1890–1898	Succeeded by Sir Pieter Hendrik Faure, KCMG
Political offices
Preceded by Louis Abrahamson, MLA	Representative of Somerset East; 1898–1910	Succeeded by Office ended with Union
Preceded by Sir William Bisset Berry	Speaker of the House of Assembly of the Cape Colony; 1908–1910	Succeeded by Office ended with Union
Political offices
Preceded by Office created	Representative of Ceres; 1910–1915	Succeeded by ???
Preceded by Office created	Speaker of the National Assembly of South Africa; 1910–1915	Succeeded by Joel Krige
