= Molteno Brothers =

South African farmers and businesspeople

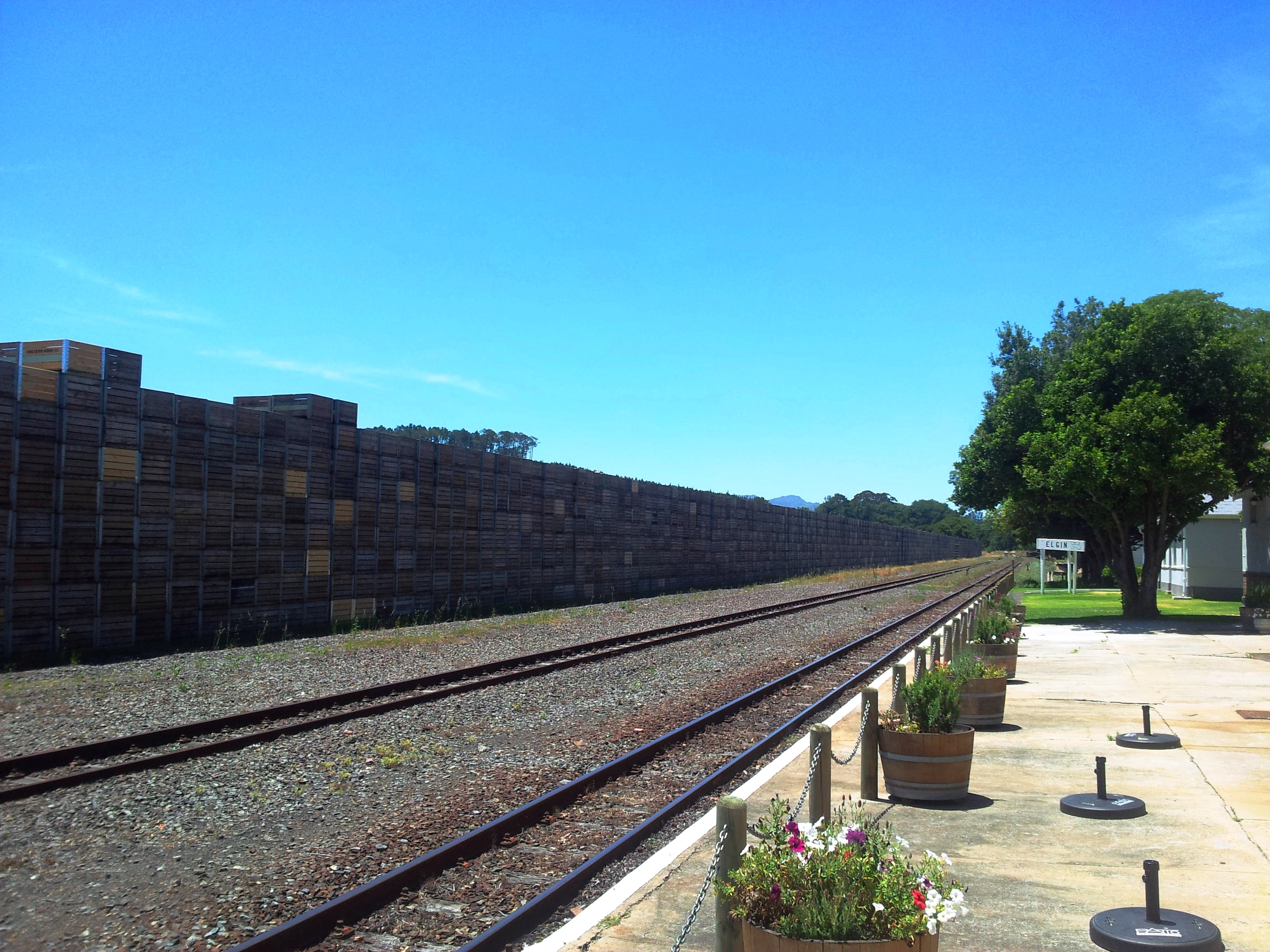
Molteno Brothers produce at the station at Glen Elgin

Edward Molteno (1877–1950) and Harry Molteno (1880–1969), often known as the Molteno Brothers, were sons of Cape Prime Minister John Molteno by his third wife Sobella Maria. Pioneering and successful exporters, they had a huge influence on South Africa's fruit industry.

They divided up and donated most of their farming enterprise, to be distributed to, and used for the benefit of, Elgin farm workers. After his death, the younger brother Harry left the remainder as a trust fund that continues their charitable work to this day.

== History ==
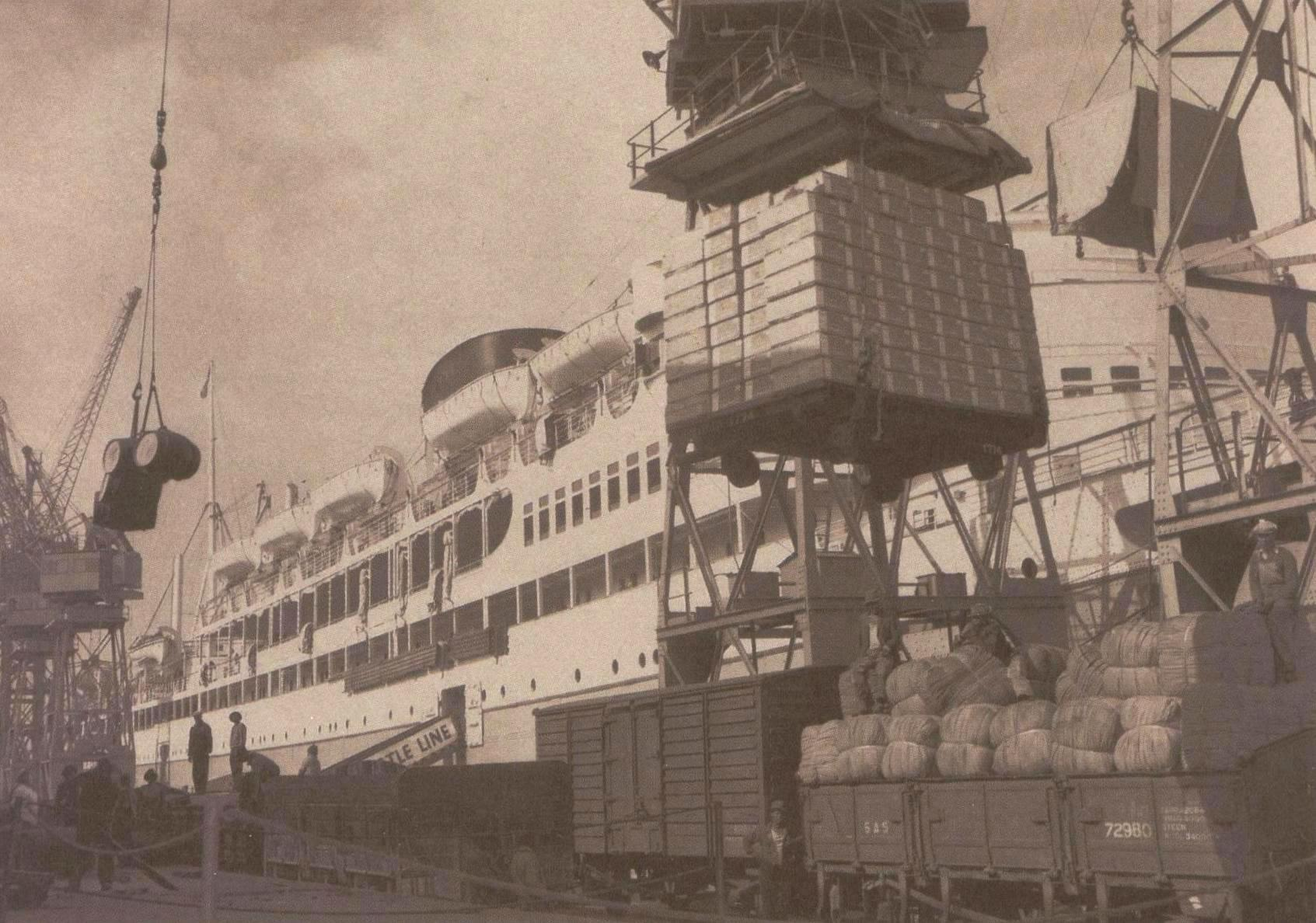
Glen Elgin produce being loaded for export at Cape Town harbour.

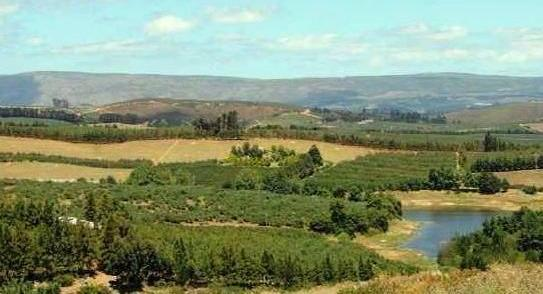
The undulating hills of the Elgin region.

The two brothers had long had an interest in building the agricultural export industry of southern Africa; in fact, their father had conducted one of the first experimental mass exports of South African fruit (chartering the Brig Comet to Australia, in 1841). The brothers first invested in the Palmiet area in 1903. They may have been influenced by the purchase of some land in the area by their older brothers, Percy and Frank Molteno.

From modest beginnings farming vegetables, they eventually built up a vast farming enterprise that spanned the entire valley and what is now the largest single export fruit producing area in Southern Africa. They restructured the South African fruit farming industry along scientific lines, pioneering new farming and cold storage practices and were influential in the development and uplifting of rural communities in the area. They also founded the Cape Tercentenary Foundation in 1950 to promote and support the arts and the environment in the Cape (Both brothers were extremely well read, appreciators of music and the arts, and were deeply concerned about the natural environment).

At the height of their success, the brothers took the unusual move of ordering that their network of farms was to be divided up and returned "...to Elgin's farmworkers and inhabitants for their own use." This process accelerated in the 1950s after Edward's death.

Their farming enterprise was broken up and ceased to exist, but its name, Elgin, came to refer to the whole region. This area is today one of the more intensively farmed districts of South Africa and produces 60% of the national apple crop.

== Molteno Trust ==
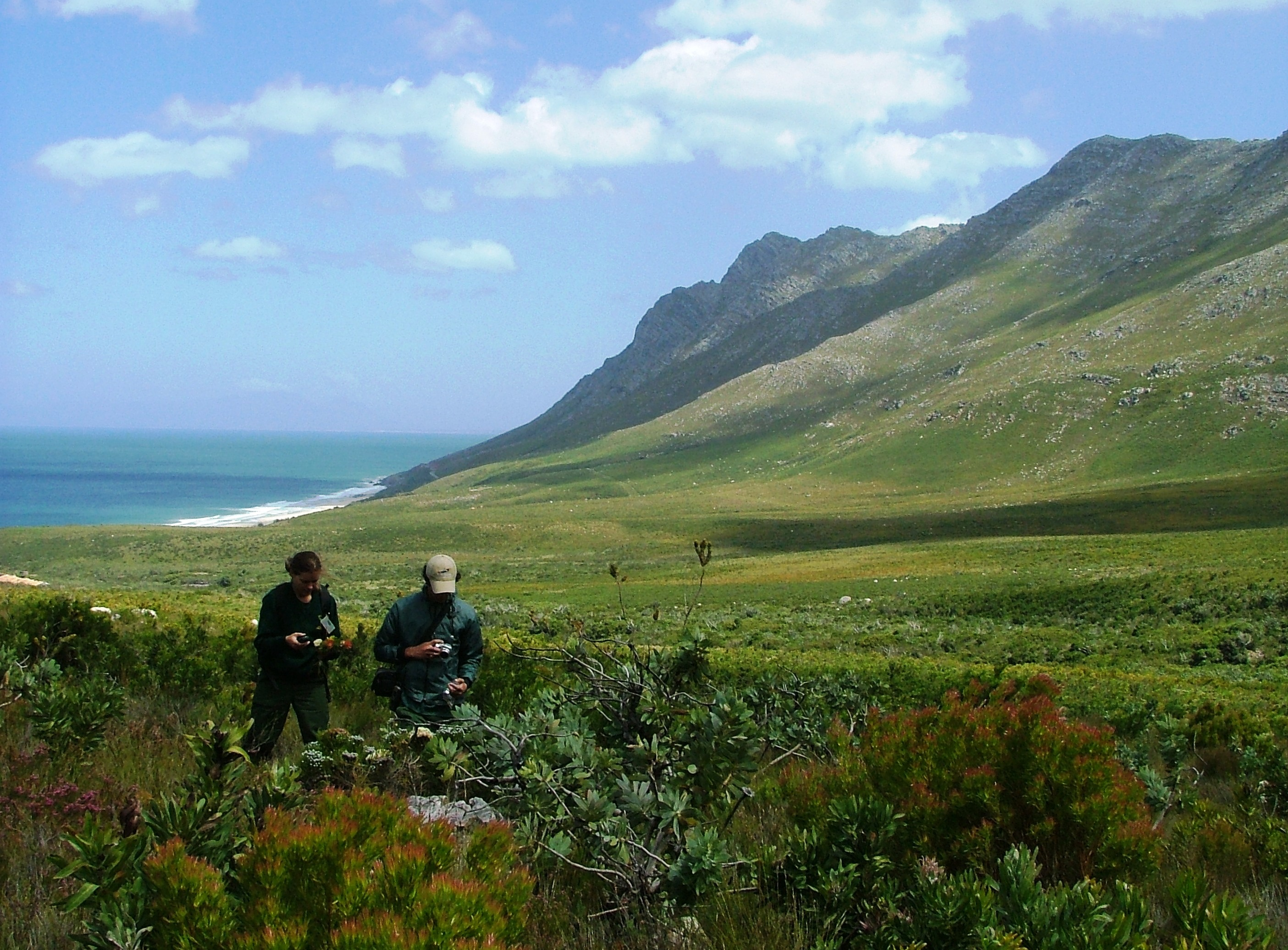
Molteno Bros gave extensive land and funding for the establishment of the Kogelberg Biosphere Reserve

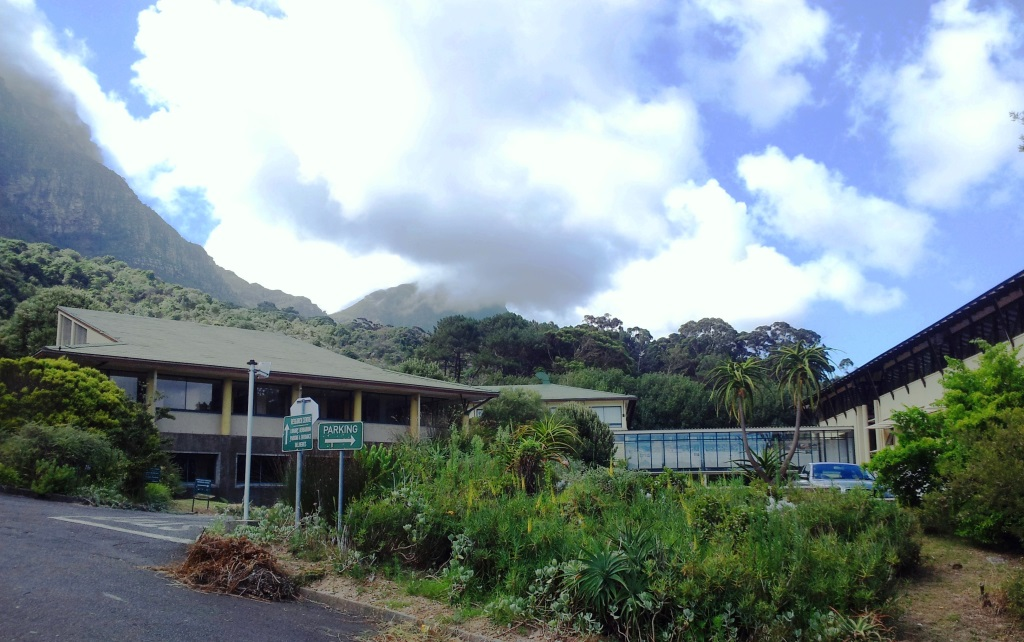
Library and Research centre of Kirstenbosch Botanical Gardens, another major beneficiary of the trust

A body that seeks to support education, cultural institutions and environmental causes in Southern Africa, in terms of the will of the younger brother Harry Molteno, who died in 1969. Annual donations from the trust to such causes are derived mainly from the remaining Glen Elgin farms, which they bequeathed to the Trust. The operations are today managed by a team who are overseen by a board of Directors, also appointed according to Harry's will.

Specific projects and charities of the trust include:

- The Molteno Institute for Language and Literacy, a charity that has enliterated over 10 million learners across Africa.
- Bursaries to universities like the University of Cape Town (UCT) and Rhodes University.
- Extensive support for Kirstenbosch Botanical Gardens, including funding the research centre and the Molteno Library Wing.
- Continued support for the Cape Tercentenary Foundation and its projects.

== See also ==
- Glen Elgin
- The Molteno Institute for Language and Literacy
- The Cape Tercentenary Foundation
- Molteno (disambiguation)
