= South Africa Conciliation Committee =

The South Africa Conciliation Committee was a British anti-war organisation opposed to the Second Boer War.

The committee was formed in 1899 in response to the outbreak of the war, for the "dissemination of accurate information", and to seek an early "peaceable settlement between this country and the Boer Republics". The Conciliation Committee campaigned chiefly for formal negotiations to end the war. Among other movements, the Conciliation Committee was seen to be taking the centre ground, aiming to keep South Africa in the British Empire rather than pressing for the British to withdraw unilaterally, making non-partisan appeals to reason.

Founded by Catherine Courtney, its president was the veteran politician Leonard Courtney. Courtney recruited Emily Hobhouse as secretary. Jane Cobden Unwin, daughter of the Radical and Liberal statesman Richard Cobden, was a founder member, as was the suffragist Elizabeth Maria Molteno, daughter of the first Cape Prime Minister, John Molteno. Other prominent members included John Clifford, president of the Stop the War Committee, Allan Heywood Bright MP, Sir Wilfrid Lawson MP, publisher Thomas Fisher Unwin, left-wing journalist Henry Brailsford, and Robert Spence Watson, author of The History of English Rule and Policy in South Africa. Cobden Unwin's sister Ellen Melicent Cobden was also a member. There was a considerable overlap with the members of the Society of Friends of Russian Freedom.

The 1900 general election was generally considered a "khaki election", and candidates such as Bright and Lawson, who were identified as "anti war", were heavily defeated. Against this background the Committee drew considerable public opposition to its campaigning, particularly when it organised a women's demonstration against the war in the same year. However, the antagonism was not as strong as that provoked by the Stop the War Committee, with its religiously inspired utopian approach.

The Conciliation Committee's distinctive role was seen by The Spectator as providing authentic information about the war. Emily Hobhouse visited South Africa in 1900–1; her 1901 report on the concentration camps led to the Fawcett Commission, which formally confirmed her findings.

The South African branch of the Conciliation Committee was founded in Cape Town in early 1900, under the chairmanship of prominent parliamentarian John Molteno. It fought a long-running (though ultimately relatively successful) battle against state censorship and martial law.
