= Molteno (disambiguation) =

Molteno is a town in Lombardy, Italy.

Molteno may also refer to:

== Places ==
- Molteno, South Africa
  - Molteno Hospital in Molteno, South Africa
- Molteno Dam, a historic dam in Cape Town, South Africa
- Molteno Formation, a palaeontological formation in Lesotho and South Africa
- Molteno Pass, mountain pass near Beaufort West, South Africa

== Other uses ==
- Molteno (surname), several people, including historical persons in the Italian diaspora
- Molteno Brothers, farming enterprise and trust fund of Edward and Harry Molteno
- Molteno Institute for Language and Literacy, an NGO to combat illiteracy in Africa
- Molteno Regulations, a system of grants, for open-to-all public libraries in South Africa
