= Carla Molteni =

Italian professor of physics

- Born: February 1966 (age 60)
- Education: University of Milan (PhD)
- Scientific career
- Fields: Condensed matter physics
- Workplaces: King's College London; University of Cambridge; Max Planck Institute for Solid State Research
- Website: kclpure.kcl.ac.uk/portal/carla.molteni.html

Carla Molteni (born February 1966) is an Italian Professor of Physics at King's College London. She works on computer simulations of materials and biomolecules.

== Education and early career ==
Molteni studied physics at the University of Milan. She remained there for her graduate studies. She was originally interested in particle physics, but became more fascinated by material science as she became aware of its impact in designing materials of the future.

== Research and career ==
Molteni joined Max Planck Institute for Solid State Research as a postdoctoral research fellow, working on crystalline glucose. She used the Car–Parrinello molecular dynamics method to study glucose.

Molteni joined the University of Cambridge in 1999 as an Engineering and Physical Sciences Research Council (EPSRC) Advanced Research Fellow. She was a fellow at New Hall, (now Murray Edwards College) Cambridge.

In 2003 Molteni was appointed a professor of soft matter physics at King's College London. Molteni is a member of the Thomas Young Centre and London Centre for Nanotechnology. She uses density functional theory and classical methods to understand systems such as grain boundaries, liquid crystals, polymers and proteins. She studied polyamorphism in nanocrystals of silicon. Her group have used computational methods to evaluate the interactions of green tea with cardiac muscle and the growth of hexagonal ice. They identified the excited states of biological chromophores using many-body perturbation theory. She studied the pressure-induced deformations of nanomaterials and how this impacted their optoelectronic properties. Understanding piezochromic effects is important to determine the potential of a material for applications such as stress sensors.

In 2018 she awarded the Italy Made Me prizes for young Italian researchers in the UK. She serves on the board of directors of the Association of Italian Scientists in the UK. She has taken part in Pint of Science.
