= Donald Barkly Molteno =

South African politician (1908–1972)

Donald Barkly Molteno (13 February 1908 – 1972), known as Dilizintaba ("He who removes mountains"), was a South African parliamentarian, constitutional lawyer, champion of civil rights and a prominent opponent of Apartheid.

== Early life and legal career ==
He was born on 13 February 1908 in Cape Town, in the then Cape Colony, into a family with a long tradition of political involvement and public service in the Cape (his grandfather, John Molteno was its first Prime Minister).

He attended Diocesan College and Cambridge University, where he graduated in 1930 with Honours in Law and was called to the Bar at the Inner Temple. After practising law for a time in London, he returned to South Africa in 1932 and was admitted as an advocate to the Bar of the Cape Provincial Division of the Supreme Court of South Africa. He was made a Q.C. in 1952 and practised at the Cape Bar until 1964.

He was also President of the Cape Bar Council from 1961 to 1963.

== Political career ==
Molteno was involved in anti-Apartheid politics from a young age. In 1937 he was approached by the ANC, who asked him to represent them in the House of Assembly.

He was elected a Member of Parliament at the age of 29, representing the Western Cape constituency for 11 years until 1948. During this time he was an exceptionally prominent and active MP in the opposition. He was a member of the Civil Rights League, Cafda and the Cape Joint Council of Europeans and Bantu. He was also the regional representative on the South African Institute of Race Relations in the Western Cape in 1936, and was its president from 1958 to 1960.

It was partly due to his fight against the segregationalist policies of J. B. M. Hertzog that he acquired the Xhosa name Dilizintaba ("Remover of mountains").

He went on to become the first chairman of the Liberal Party of South Africa's constitutional committee before he joined the Progressive Party (South Africa) and became chairman of its constitutional policy commission as well. He was also one of the Counsel engaged in the constitutional cases questioning the powers of the Union Parliament of South Africa after the passing of the Statute of Westminster in 1931.

Molteno was a supporter and the main legal advisor of the Black Sash movement, from soon after it began in 1955. The movement later wrote of him: "He taught us all we had to know about Civil Rights, about the inequities and iniquities of the pass laws and influx control...; and so very much more. His knowledge and experience illuminated all our efforts to inform and educate ourselves and the South African public." (The Black Sash, Feb. 1973)

== Academic career and later life ==
Mr Molteno was a member of the University of Cape Town Council (from 1951 to 1960) as well as a part-time lecturer in Constitutional and Administrative Law at that institution. He lectured full-time at the Department of Roman Dutch Law from 1964, and in 1967 was appointed Professor of the newly created Department of Public Law.

Molteno was appointed Dean of the Faculty of Law in 1970 - a position he held until his death in 1972. He left two children by his first wife Veronica Strömsöe and three by his second wife Mary Fleet Goldsmith. The Dictionary of South African Biography (Vol.5, p. 515) described him as, "a man of great humanity, as well as of brilliant intellect."

He appears as a character in the novel Ah, but Your Land is Beautiful by his colleague and contemporary Alan Paton.
