= Molteno Institute for Language and Literacy =

The Molteno Institute for Language and Literacy (MILL), formerly known as the Molteno Project, is a charity organisation that funds literacy programmes and research across Africa, from its headquarters in Johannesburg.

It was established in 1974, funded by the Molteno Brothers Trust from which it derives its name. It began as the Molteno Project, a large research project on problems with school pupils' acquisition of English literacy, based at Rhodes University. The research recommendations included incorporating mother-tongue material in literacy courses for children. When this conclusion was confirmed by positive results, the project rolled out graded readers across the continent and adapted into 52 African languages.

In 2008 it had taught more than 10 million learners across the African continent to read and write, making it one of the largest literacy providers in Africa.
