= John Charles Molteno =

British soldier and businessman (1814–1886)

The Right Honourable Sir John Charles Molteno KCMG
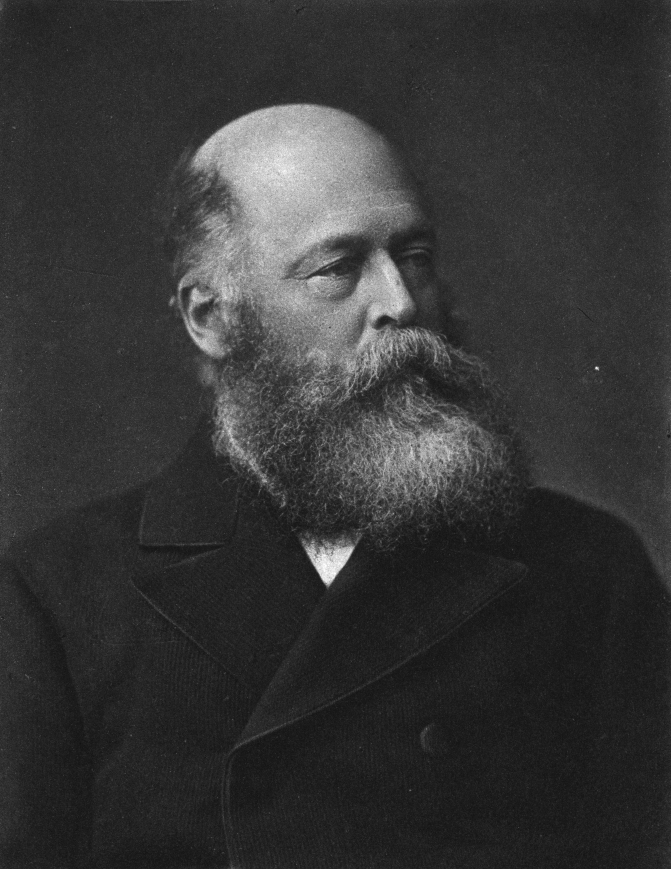
- Molteno in 1872

1st Prime Minister of the Cape Colony
- In office 1 December 1872 – 5 February 1878
- Monarch: Victoria
- Governor: Henry Barkly; Henry Bartle Frere
- Preceded by: Office Established
- Succeeded by: John Gordon Sprigg

Personal details
- Born: John Charles Molteno; 5 June 1814 London, United Kingdom
- Died: 1 September 1886 (aged 72) Cape Town, Cape Colony
- Resting place: St Saviour's Church cemetery, Claremont, Cape Town
- Party: Independent
- Children: Elizabeth Maria; John Charles; Percy; James Tennant; Vincent Barkly; Edward; Harry; 15 others
- Occupation: Statesman, businessman

Sir John Charles MoltenoKCMG (Italian: [molˈteːno]; 5 June 1814 – 1 September 1886) was a politician and businessman who served as the first Prime Minister of the Cape Colony from 1872 to 1878.

== Early life ==
Born in London into a large Anglo-Italian family, Molteno emigrated to the Cape in 1831 at the age of 17, where he found work as an assistant to the public librarian in Cape Town. At the age of 23 he founded his first company, Molteno & Co., a trading company that exported wine, wool and aloes to Mauritius and the West Indies, and opened branches around the Cape.

In 1841, he undertook Southern Africa's first experimental export of fruit, loading a ship with a range of fruits (necessarily dried, as no refrigeration existed yet) and sending it to Australia to test foreign markets.

The experiment ended in disaster when his ship was wrecked in a storm – pushing Molteno close to bankruptcy. Disposing of the remains of his mercantile businesses, he immediately bought some land in the arid Beaufort area and successfully introduced Saxon Merino sheep, building up the vast Nelspoort Estate. Among his many other business ventures, he founded the region's first bank, Alport & Co. – in Beaufort West.

He also returned briefly to Cape Town to marry a young woman named Maria, whom he had originally met soon after arriving in South Africa. She was the coloured daughter of a merchant colleague, and he brought her back to his estate, with a view to starting a family.

Tragedy struck a few years later when his wife died in childbirth (along with their only child). Soon afterwards the bereaved Molteno left his estate and joined a Boer Commando that was heading for the frontier mountains to fight in the 1846 Amatola War, where he served under the command of Sir Andries Stockenstrom and worked his way up to the rank of commandant.

== Political career ==
=== The fight for responsible government ===
The Cape economy was in a recession in the early 1860s when Molteno moved back to Cape Town, remarried and bought Claremont house (At the time an estate of orchards and vineyards, not the busy suburb that it is today).

Molteno had been elected to the Cape Colony's first parliament in 1854, representing Beaufort, the first municipality in southern Africa. However, in spite of the elected parliament, executive power remained firmly in the hands of a British governor appointed by London. Molteno's experiences fighting in the frontier wars had given him a contempt for what he saw as the incompetence and injustice of British imperial rule in Southern Africa, as well as a lifelong belief in the need for efficient and locally-accountable democracy. From his first entry into parliament, he therefore began a long political battle to make the Cape's Executive democratically accountable (or "responsible" as it was known), and thus to give the country a degree of independence from Britain.

Over the years his Responsible Government movement grew, and eventually dominated parliament and Cape politics. In the 1860s, autocratic British Governor Philip Wodehouse made repeated attempts to dismantle the few elected bodies the Cape had, and assume direct control over the colony. Molteno led the fight against these measures, using his electoral control to cut off Wodehouse's budget and effectively starve his administration into compliance. After nearly a decade of struggle, the defeated Wodehouse was recalled in 1870, amid great local celebration. Finally in 1872, with the consent of the new Governor Sir Henry Barkly, Molteno saw the decisive bill through parliament and brought the Cape Colony's government under local control for the first time.

After first offering the post to Saul Solomon and William Porter, Molteno agreed to become the Cape Colony's first prime minister.

=== The Molteno Ministry ===
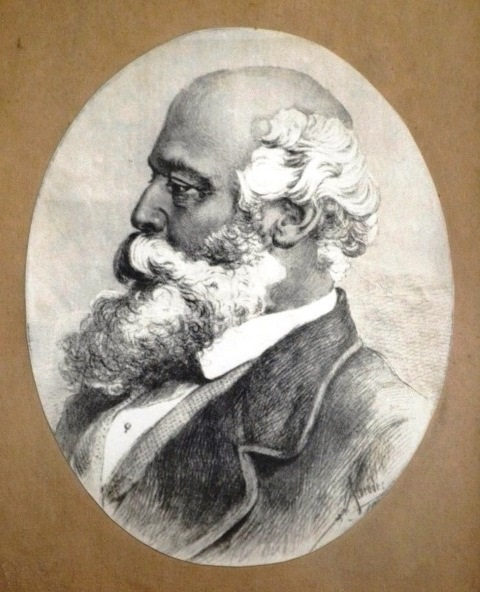
John Charles Molteno – 1860s

He was appointed prime minister in 1872, and in turn appointed the young John X. Merriman as his commissioner of public works (Merriman himself was later to become the 8th prime minister of the Cape and in that capacity continued many of Molteno's policies).

Molteno began his ministry by re-organising the state finances. One of his government's first acts was to abolish the controversial house tax (Act 11 of 1872). He used the new revenues from the diamond and ostrich feather industries to pay off the Cape's accumulated debts and to invest heavily in infrastructure, including a telegraph system and an ambitious railway building programme. He also oversaw a revival in the agricultural sector, and began the construction of a vast irrigation system across the country. The economy recovered, as new ports and shipping services helped the surge in exports, resulting in reasonable budget surpluses by the end of his tenure. He led the (now prosperous) Cape colony in the Ninth Frontier War when it broke out in 1877, and he strongly resisted regional factionalism – going to great lengths to heal the rifts between the eastern and western halves of the Cape and blocking attempts by his political opponents to racially segregate the armed forces.

His government also founded the University of the Cape of Good Hope, now one of the world's mega-universities with over 200,000 students, and Victoria College (later to become Stellenbosch University). In 1874 he established a system of government grants to build libraries in towns and villages across the country. Later known as the "Molteno Regulations", they were an immense success and were later adopted by neighbouring countries.

The Molteno Ministry was characterised by its stout opposition to imperial interference in Cape affairs, for example, quashing a bid to forcefully incorporate Griqualand West and opposing Frere's later deployment of imperial troops against the Xhosa.

Importantly, the system of responsible government as instituted under Molteno retained the traditional Cape system of non-racial franchise – whereby all races could vote, quite unlike the situation in the rest of Southern Africa.

=== Confederation and War ===
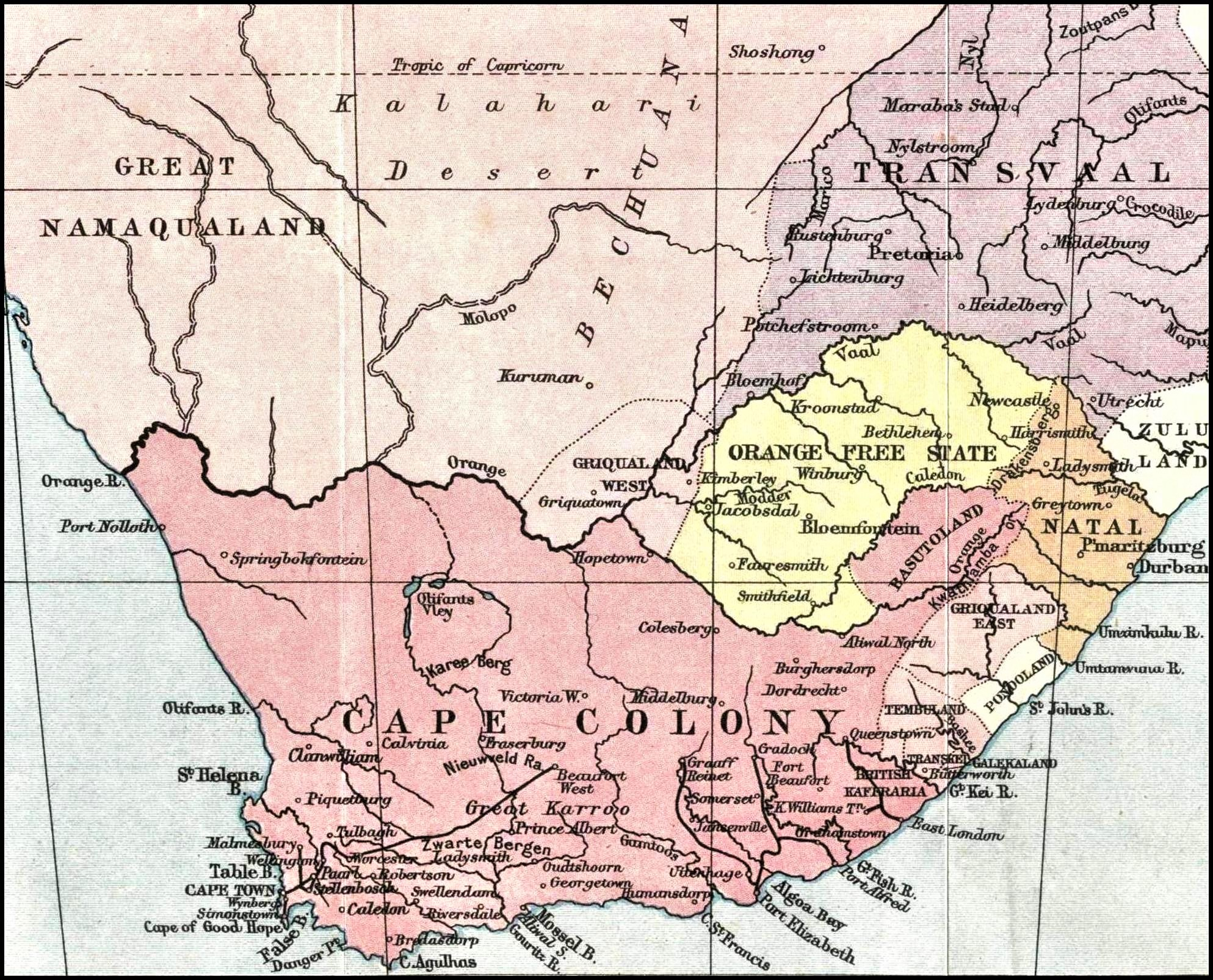
The Cape Colony in 1878, on the eve of the Confederation Wars.

A change of government in London led to a pro-imperialist lobby headed by Secretary of State, Lord Carnarvon, determined to bring all of southern Africa into the British Empire by enforcing a confederation onto the region. This "new and impatient imperialism" was resisted by the various polities of southern Africa, including the Cape colony government, and relations between the Molteno government and the Colonial Office deteriorated.

Molteno himself argued that "the proposals for confederation should emanate from the communities to be affected, and not be pressed upon them from outside." – and that the whole scheme was particularly badly timed. Relations between different polities of southern Africa still remained tense after the last bout of British imperial expansion, and he stressed that the forced imposition of a lop-sided confederation would cause immense instability. Molteno's government also transmitted to London its concern that any federation with the illiberal Boer republics would endanger the rights and franchise of the Cape's Black citizens; if there was to be any form of union, the Cape's non-racialism would need to be imposed on the Boer republics, and could not be compromised.

However, the Colonial Office went ahead and dismissed Barkly and appointed Henry Bartle Frere who on 3 February 1878 dissolved the Cape government. Frere was a formidable colonial administrator but had scant experience of southern Africa and the confederation scheme soon fell apart, resulting in a series of long-running conflicts, including wars with the Xhosa, Pedi and Basotho nations. After the disastrous first British invasion of Zululand and rising discontent in the Transvaal (that later resulted in the First Boer War), Frere was recalled to London to face charges of misconduct in 1880.

=== Later political career and legacy ===
Molteno was repeatedly asked to form a government again, however (by now in his late sixties) he declined and chose to retire from public life to spend time with his family. He directed the appointment of Thomas Charles Scanlen instead, and his last office was a brief stint advising the Scanlen Ministry as Colonial Secretary before he retired completely. His legacy was in the system of responsible government and parliamentary accountability that he established.

Molteno did not refer to himself as a liberal, preferring to see himself simply as a pragmatist. However, as an early proponent of multi-racial democracy, he was very influential on the later Cape Liberal tradition.

He was knighted by Queen Victoria in 1882. (He had previously refused knighthoods three times earlier in his career.)

== Later life and family ==
In person, Molteno was described as straight-talking and good-natured, with an easy laugh and a mischievous smile; politically outspoken and vigilant. His strongest political opponents on the other hand, accused him of being fierce, stubborn, and too much influenced by Saul Solomon (a liberal MP whom Molteno held in high regard). In Lord De Villiers's biography he is summed up as "a fighter, who did not mind hard knocks, as long as he could return them."

Molteno was unusually tall and powerfully built. In Southern Africa he acquired the nickname the "Lion of Beaufort", though his British opponents reputedly referred to him in private as the "Beaufort Boer". The nicknames were both reportedly due to his deep booming voice, his height, and the large beard he grew in later life. The Dictionary of National Biography adds "Sir John Molteno was a man of commanding presence and great physical strength. In private life, he was of most simple and unostentatious habits."

Molteno was married three times and had a total of nineteen children, founding a large and influential South African family. His immediate descendants included politicians and members of parliament, shipping magnates and exporters, military leaders, suffragists and anti-Apartheid activists.

Although born and raised a Catholic, Molteno was tight-lipped on the subject of his religious beliefs, unusual for a man known to be frank and direct. According to his son and biographer, he disliked denominations and was a freethinker.

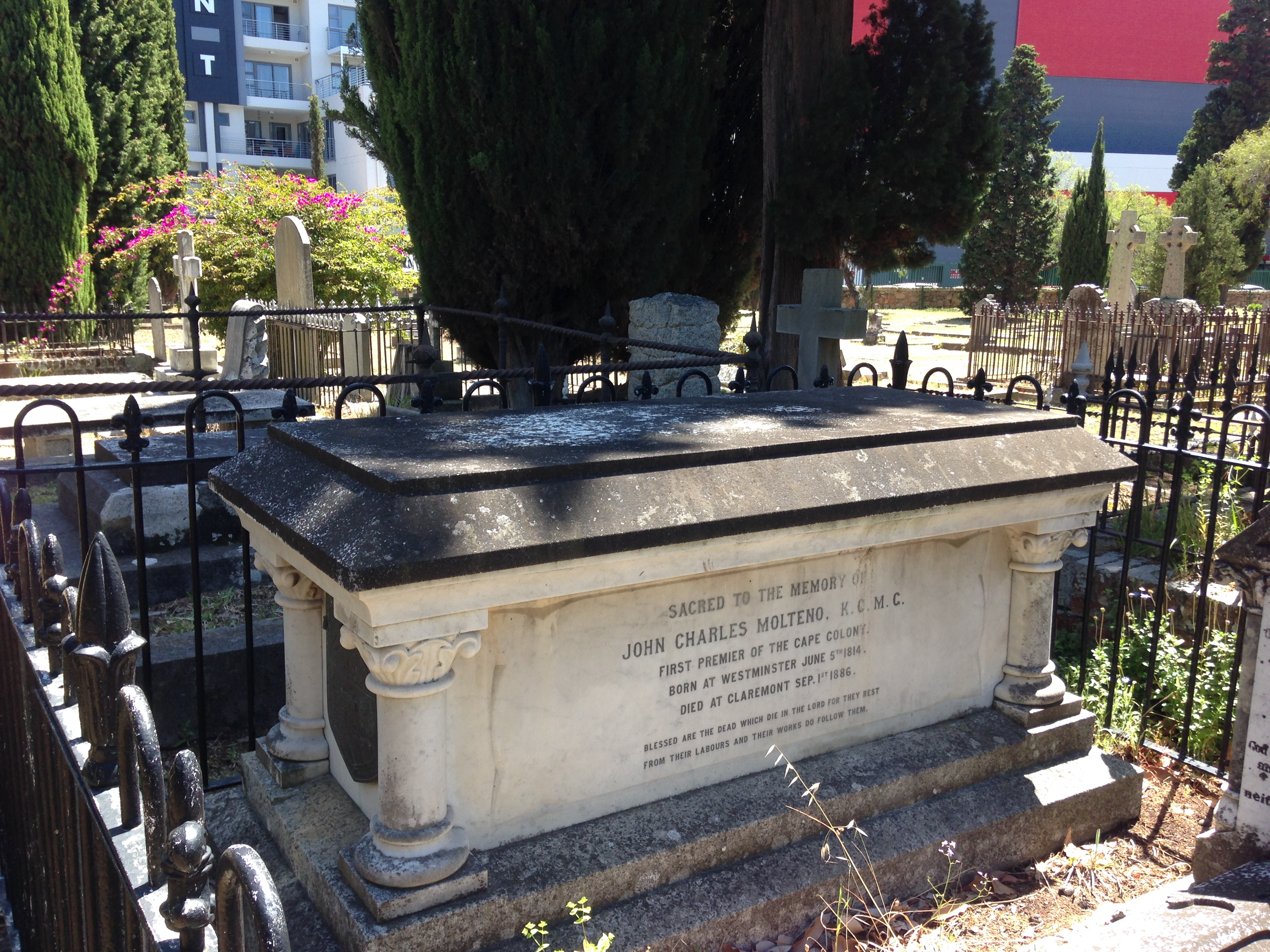
The grave of John Charles Molteno at St Saviour's in Claremont, Cape Town.

The "Lion of Beaufort" died on 1 September 1886 and was interred at St Saviour's in Claremont, Cape Town.

The town of Molteno, in the Stormberg Mountains of South Africa, is named after him.

== See also ==
- John Charles Molteno Jr.
- History of Cape Colony from 1870 to 1899
- Parliament of South Africa
- Union of South Africa
- Henry Bartle Frere
- Donald Barkly Molteno
- Elizabeth Maria Molteno
- Percy Alport Molteno
- Sir James Tennant Molteno
- Thomas Charles Scanlen
- John Gordon Sprigg
- Molteno (disambiguation)

== Notes and references ==
- Simons, Phillida Brooke (1999). Apples of the sun: being an account of the lives, vision, and achievements of the Molteno brothers, Edward Bartle Frere and Henry Anderson. Fernwood Press. ISBN 978-1-874950-45-5.
- Lipschutz, Mark R.; Rasmussen, R. Kent (1989). Dictionary of African Historical Biography. University of California Press. ISBN 978-0-520-06611-3.
- De Beer, Gerhard; Paterson, Annemarie; Olivier, Hennie (2003). 160 Years of Export: The History of the Perishable Products Export Control Board. Perishable Products Export Control Board. ISBN 978-0-620-30967-7.
- Lewsen, Phyllis (1982). John X. Merriman: Paradoxical South African Statesman. Yale University Press. ISBN 978-0-300-02521-7.
- Mostert, Noël (1992). Frontiers: The Epic of South Africa's Creation and the Tragedy of the Xhosa People. Pimlico. ISBN 978-0-7126-5584-2.
- Murray, Richard William (1965). Indexes to Limner (R. W. Murray), Pen and Ink Sketches in Parliament, and R. W. Murray, South African Reminiscences. University of Cape Town Libraries.
- Walker, Eric Anderson (1925). Lord de Villiers and His Times: South Africa, 1842–1914. Constable Limited.
- Atlay, James Beresford (1901). "Molteno, John Charles" . In Lee, Sidney (ed.). Dictionary of National Biography (1st supplement). Vol. 3. London: Smith, Elder & Co.
- Malherbe, Vertrees Canby (1971). What They Said, 1795–1910: A Selection of Documents from South African History. Maskew Miller. ISBN 978-0-623-00457-9.
- Macmillan, Mona (1970). Sir Henry Barkly: Mediator and Moderator, 1815-1898. Cape Town: A. A. Balkema.

Political offices
New title	Representative of Beaufort West; 1854–1878	Succeeded by Rev. W.P. de Villiers
New title	Colonial Secretary; 1872–1878	Succeeded by John Gordon Sprigg
New title	Prime Minister of the Cape Colony; 1872–1878	Succeeded by John Gordon Sprigg
Preceded by ???	Representative of Victoria West; 1880–1883	Succeeded by ???
Preceded by John Gordon Sprigg	Colonial Secretary; 1881–1883	Succeeded by Thomas Charles Scanlen
