= Archibald McKendrick =

Scottish dentist and radiologist

Archibald McKendrick FRSE
- Born: 1 June 1876; Kirkcaldy, Fife
- Died: 2 November 1960 (aged 84); Edinburgh
- Scientific career
- Fields: Dentistry, Radiology

Dr Archibald McKendrick LDS FRSE DPH (1 June 1876 – 2 November 1960) was a Scottish dentist and radiologist. He was one of the first people in Britain to use X-rays in dentistry.

== Life ==
He was born in Kirkcaldy in Fife on 1 June 1876, the son of James D. McKendrick, dental surgeon. He followed in his father's footsteps and qualified as a Dentist in Edinburgh in 1899. In 1907 he was elected a Fellow of the Royal College of Surgeons of Edinburgh.

From 1909 he was working as Surgeon/Dental Surgeon in charge of Radiology under Dawson Turner (radiologist) with William Hope Fowler at the Edinburgh Royal Infirmary. He was then living at 27 Chalmers Street next to the Infirmary. In 1914 he was elected a Fellow of the Royal Society of Edinburgh. His proposers were Arthur Robinson, Henry Harvey Littlejohn, David Berry Hart, and Thomas William Drinkwater.

He died in Edinburgh on 2 November 1960 aged 84.

== Family ==
In 1909 he married Gertrude Maud Smith.
