= Arthur Radiguet =

French inventor (1850–1905)

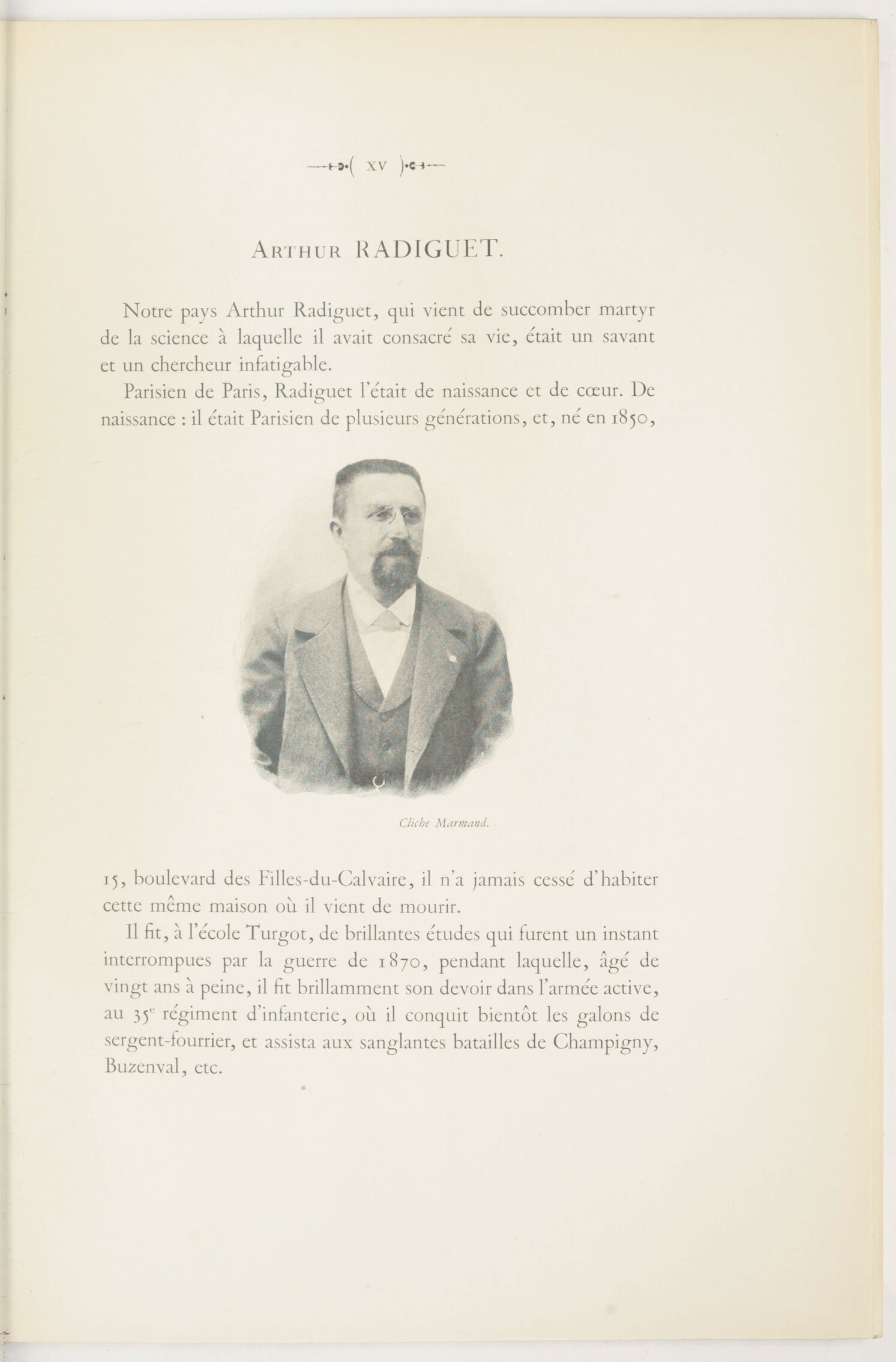
- Born: 8 April 1850; Old 8th arrondisement, Paris
- Died: 6 December 1905 (aged 55); 3rd arrondissement, Paris
- Relatives: Raymond Radiguet (great-nephew)

Arthur Radiguet (8 April 1850 – 6 December 1905) was a French inventor.

== Biography ==
Arthur Radiguet was born on 8 April 1850, in the house of his parents, optician Honoré Radiguet and Sophie née Muret, in Paris' old 8th arrondissement.

He attended the Lycée Turgot. In 1870, during the Franco-Prussian War, he was assigned to the 35th Infantry Regiment. Afterwards, he joined the family business, Radiguet et Fils, which specialized in the production and sale of optical instruments. He extended the sphere of the company's activity to popular science, producing educational devices functioning through steam and electricity.

Radiguet was interested in photography and radiography. In 1899, he went into business with his son-in-law Georges Massiot; the company absorbed the business of Alfred Molteni, which was known for its projection devices and important offering of projection slides.

Radiguet was one of the first French deaths from radiodermatitis.

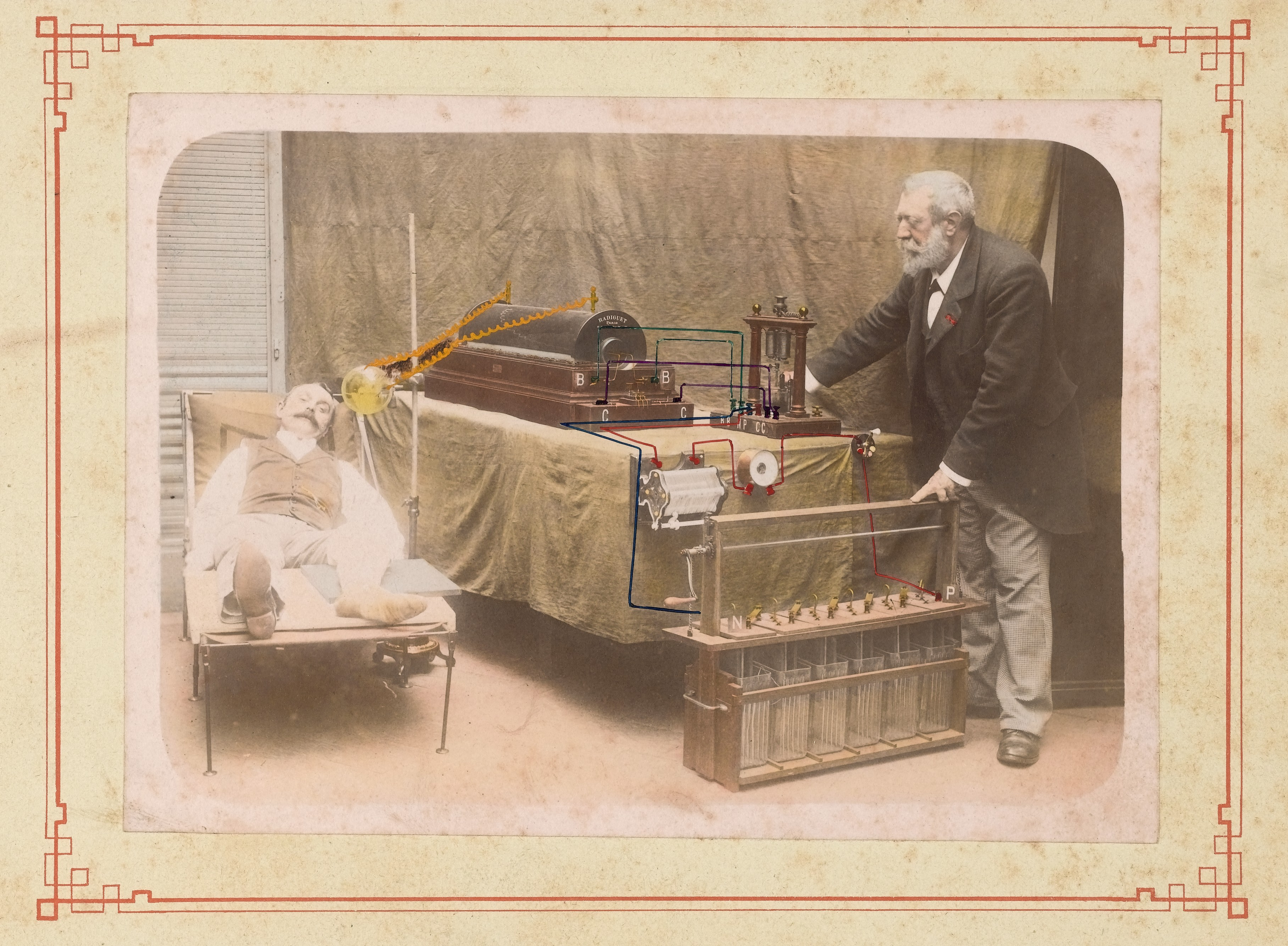
Radiograph

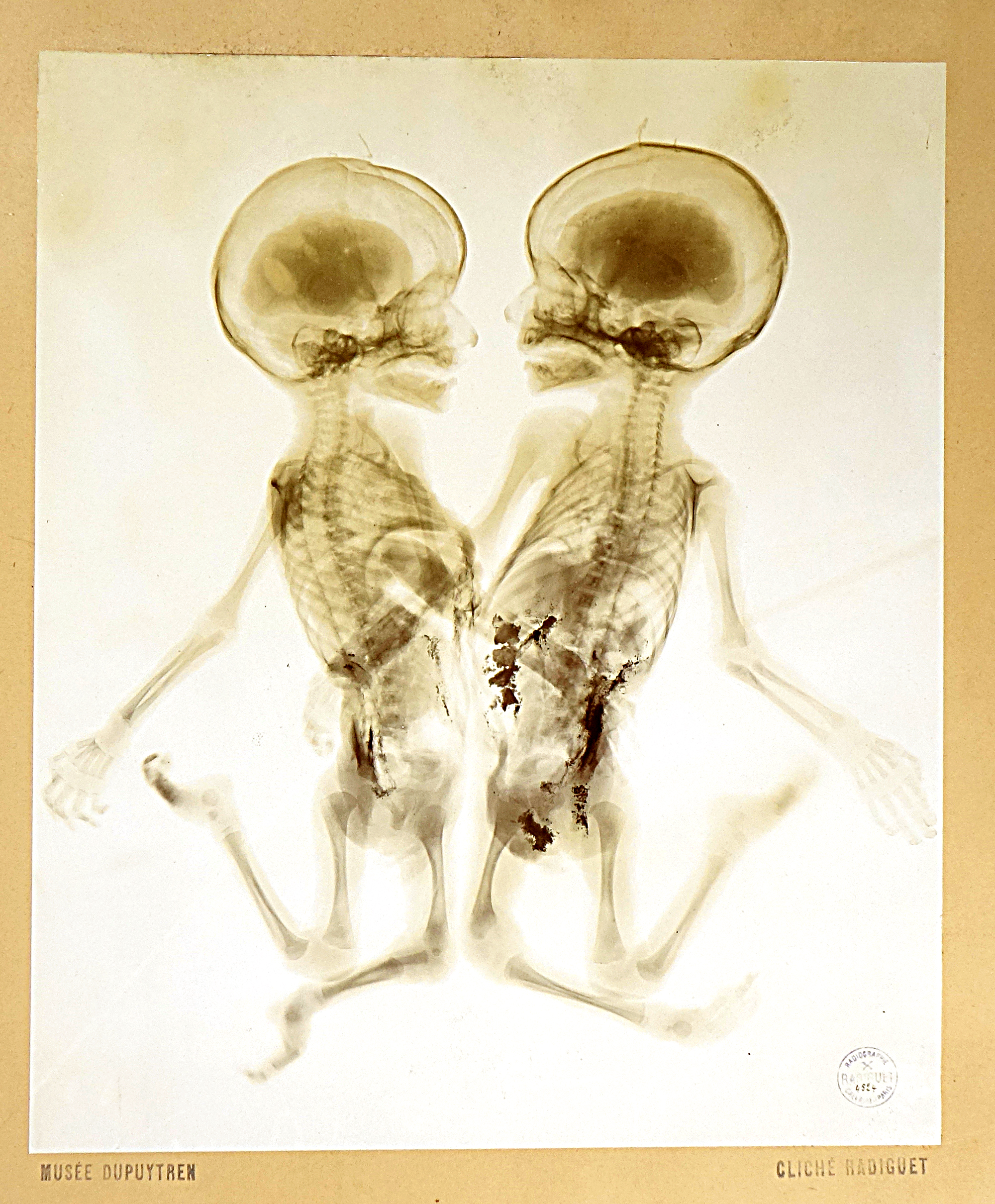
Radiograph

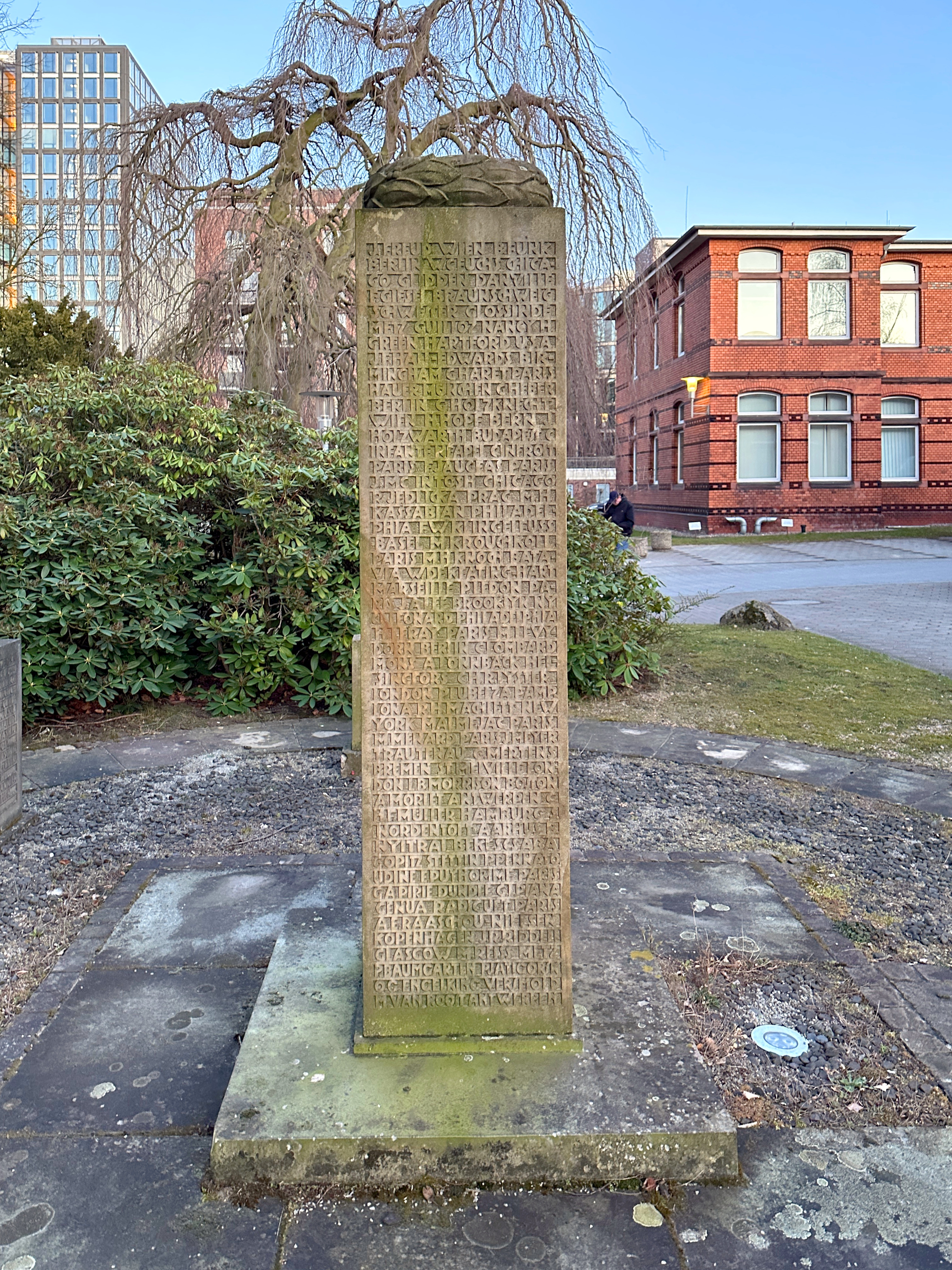
Memorial

He died on 6 December 1905, at his home in the 3rd arrondissement of Paris, and is interred at Père-Lachaise Cemetery (58th division). A cast of his hands, which were burned by X-rays, is preserved at the Hôpital Saint-Louis.

His name is engraved on the Monument to the X-ray and Radium Martyrs of All Nations.

== Distinctions ==
- Officier d'académie, 1892
- Officier de l'Instruction publique, 1899
