= John W. L. Spence =

John Webster Lowson Spence MD LRCP LRCS (11 August 1870 – 15 March 1930) was a Scottish x-ray pioneer and an early victim of radiation poisoning. His name is one of 14 British professionals listed on the Monument to the X-ray and Radium Martyrs of All Nations, which was erected in 1936. In the words of his gravestone: he died that others might live.

== Life ==
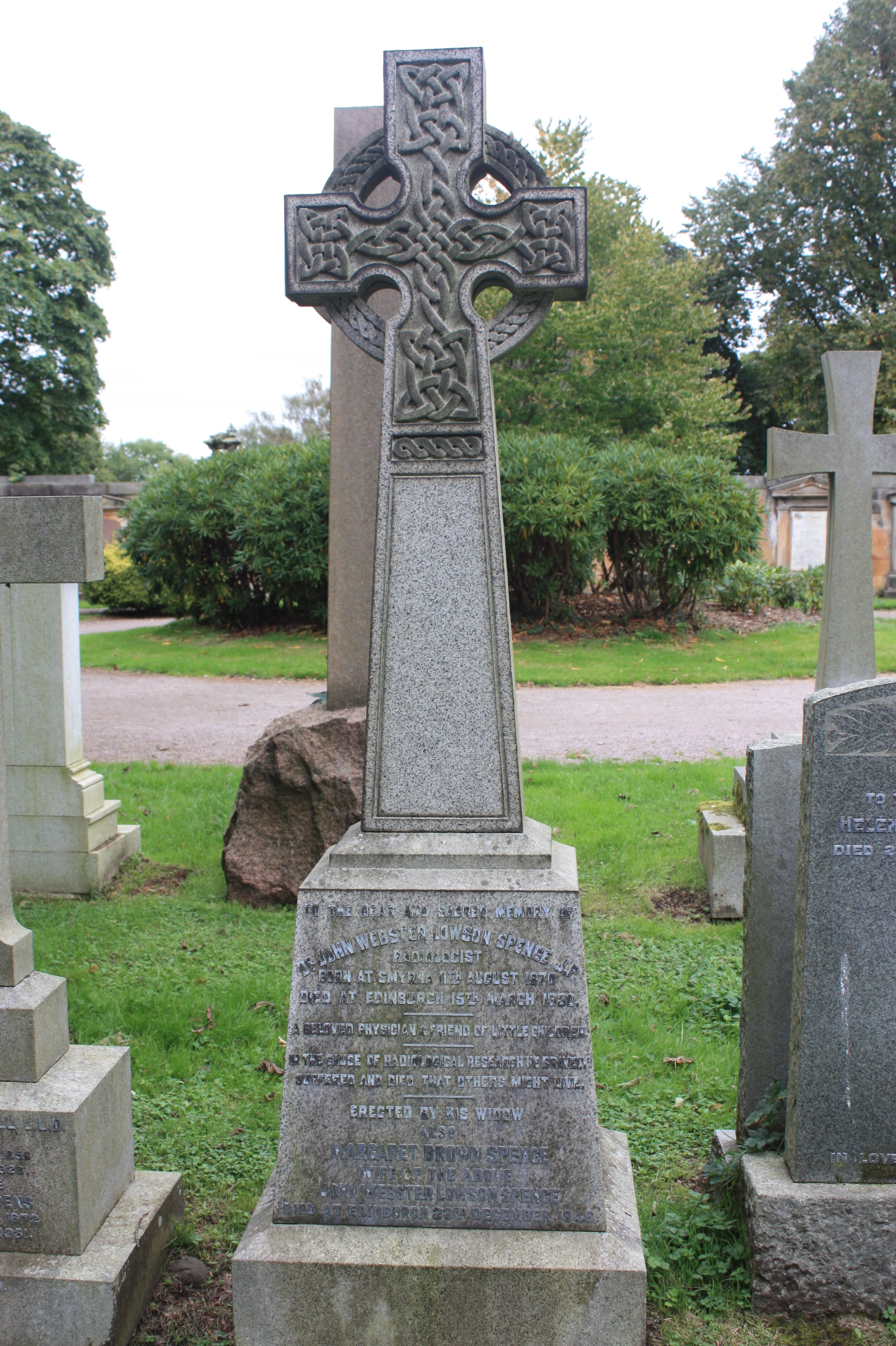
The grave of John W L Spence, Dean Cemetery

He was born in Smyrna in the Ottoman Empire on 11 August 1870 the son of Rev David Brown Spence, a Church of Scotland missionary. He was educated at the Royal High School in Edinburgh. He studied medicine at the University of Edinburgh, and from 1897 studied radiology under, or in correspondence with, Wilhelm Röntgen. He received his doctorate (MD) in 1898.

Around 1903 he came to Edinburgh to assist Dawson Turner and William Hope Fowler in their experiments on radiology. In 1907 he became the only radiologist at the Edinburgh Sick Children's Hospital in Sciennes. He was widely respected for his work and kindness.

It was common for early radiology pioneers to self-experiment, most commonly on their left arm as the majority of doctors were right-handed. Around 1910 he had several radiation-induced tumours, and by 1916 had his left arm amputated. In 1922 he was awarded a bronze medal by the Carnegie Hero Fund in recognition of his work.

In 1916 he offered his services to the army during the First World War but was not required to serve.

He lived at 22 Pitt Street (renamed Dublin Street in 1922), Edinburgh.

He retired in 1929 due to an inability to continue work and died in Edinburgh on 15 March 1930. He is buried in Dean Cemetery.

In 1936 his name was included (along with Turner and Fowler) in the list of names on the Monument to the X-ray and Radium Martyrs of All Nations erected in Hamburg, Germany.
