= William Hope Fowler =

Scottish radiology pioneer and co-founder of Edinburgh School of Radiology

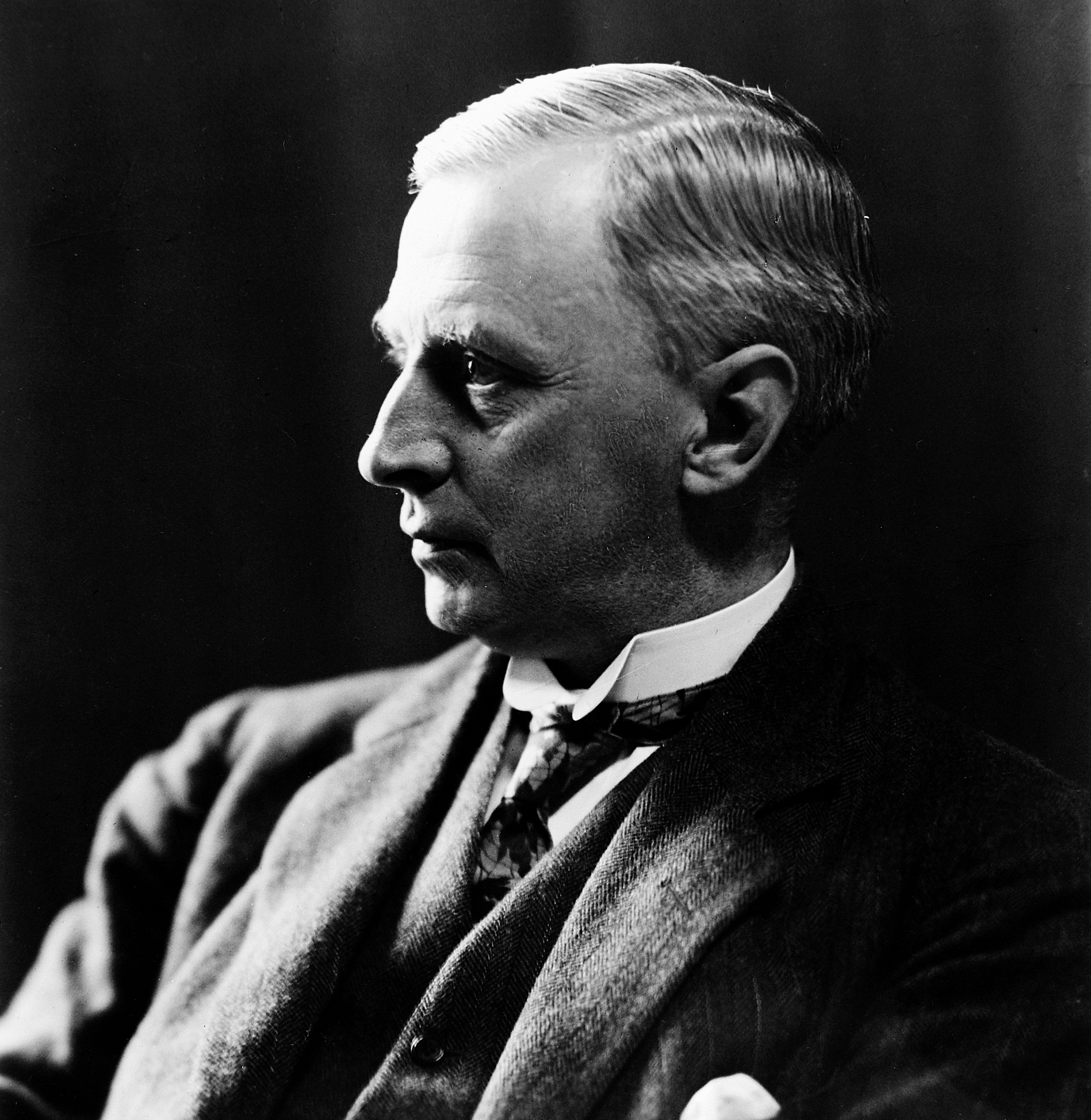
William Hope Fowler

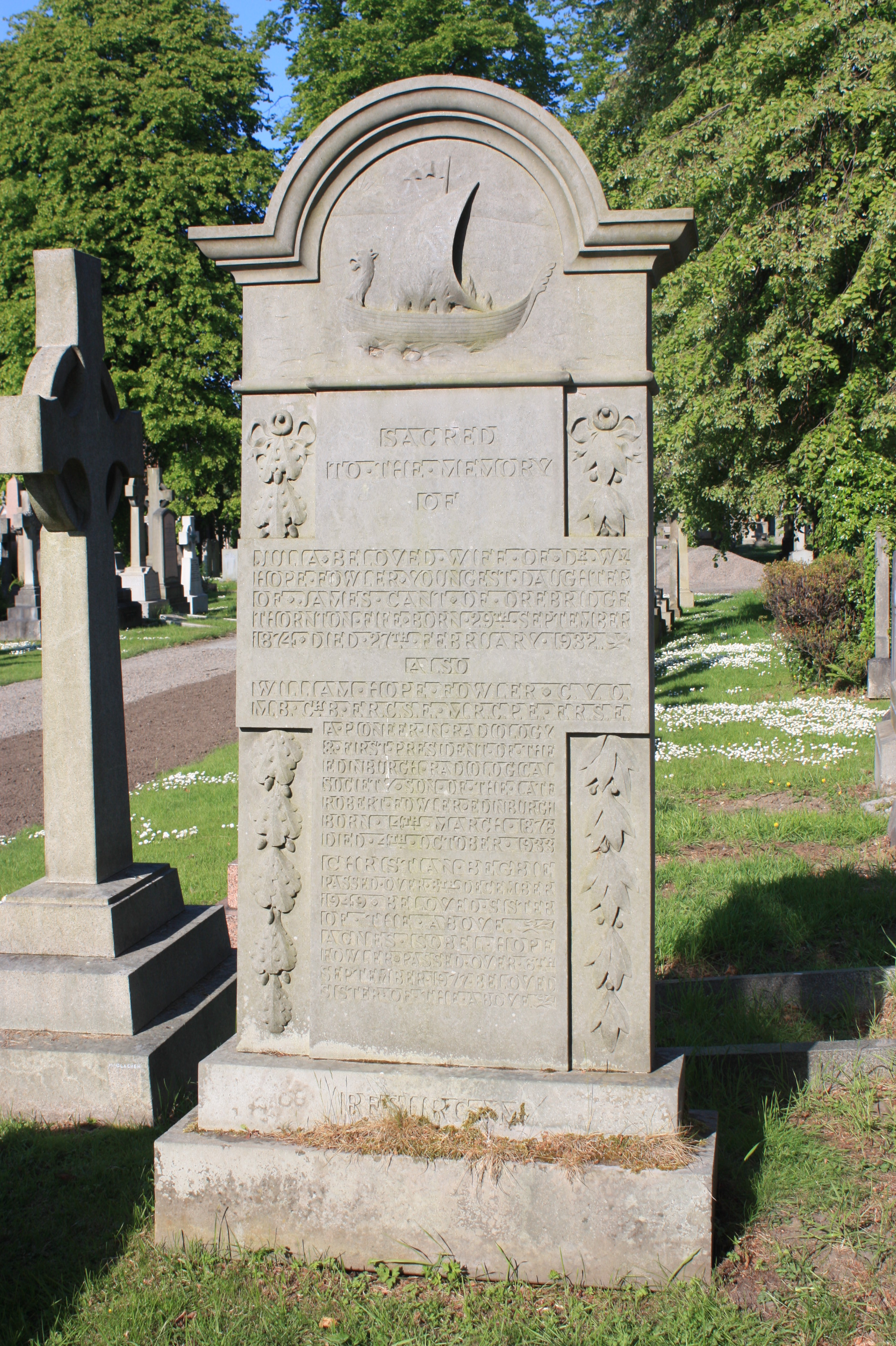
The grave of William Hope Fowler, Dean Cemetery

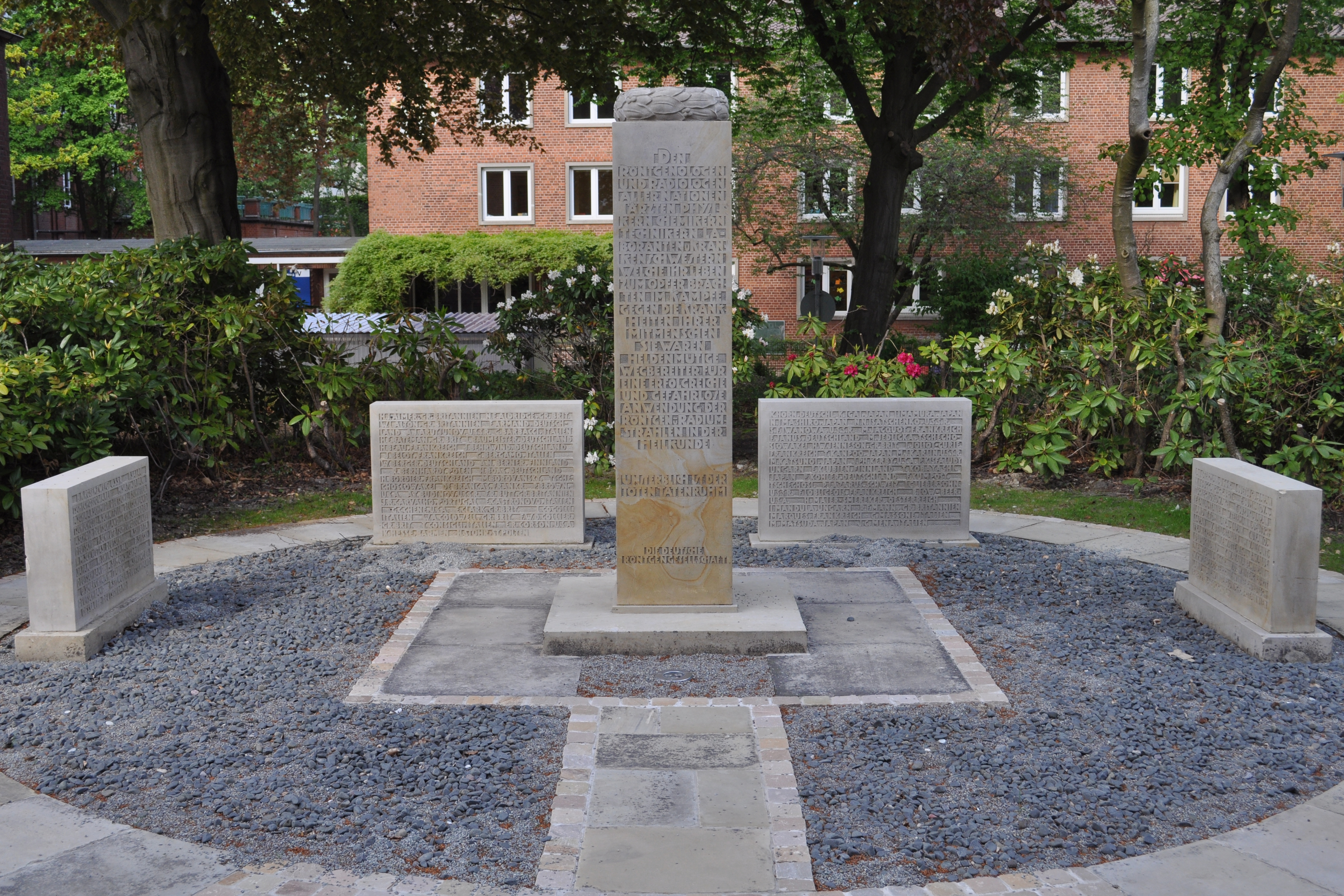
The Monument to the Martyrs of Radiology in Hamburg

William Hope Fowler CVO FRSE FRCSE (14 March 1876 – 4 October 1933) was a Scottish medical doctor and pioneer of radiology. He was co-founder of the Edinburgh School of Radiology.

== Life ==
He was born in Edinburgh on 14 March 1876, the son of Robert Fowler, an accountant. His early years were spent at 81 Cumberland Street in Edinburgh's New Town.

He was educated at Daniel Stewart's College them studied medicine at the University of Edinburgh, graduating with an MB ChB in 1897. He went to work as resident house surgeon at the Edinburgh Royal Infirmary on Lauriston Place. He showed a keen interest in the use of electricity to treat disease and was particularly interested in the newly discovered x-ray process. In 1901 he became the infirmary's Assistant Radiologist under Dawson Turner. In 1907 they were joined by John W. L. Spence. In 1911 he was promoted to Chief Radiologist alongside Archibald McKendrick. In the same year he became Honorary Radiologist to the Admiralty. At this time Fowler was living at 21 Walker Street in Edinburgh's West End. During World War I he was a member of the War Office's X-Ray Commission.

In 1933 he was elected a Fellow of the Royal Society of Edinburgh. His proposers were Sir Harold Stiles, Robert Wallace, James Pickering Kendall and George Freeland Barbour.

In June 1932 his right arm was amputated due to the effects of x-ray radiation. He died of radiation-related cancer on 4 October 1933 aged 67 at his home on Midmar Drive in south-west Edinburgh. He was buried in Dean Cemetery on 7 October 1933, following a ceremony at St Georges Church, West, on Charlotte Square. The gravestone lies towards the west end of the first north extension on a north–south path and is carved with a distinctive Viking longship.

He is listed on the Monument to the X-ray and Radium Martyrs of All Nations in Hamburg. His name (together with his mentor Dawson Turner and assistant JWL Spence) is one of the 14 British names of the total of 169 sadly losing their life due to their wish to advance the science of radiology.

== Family ==
He was married to Julia Cant (1874–1932) daughter of James Cant of Orebridge.
