= Cecil Lyster =

British radiologist (1859–1920)

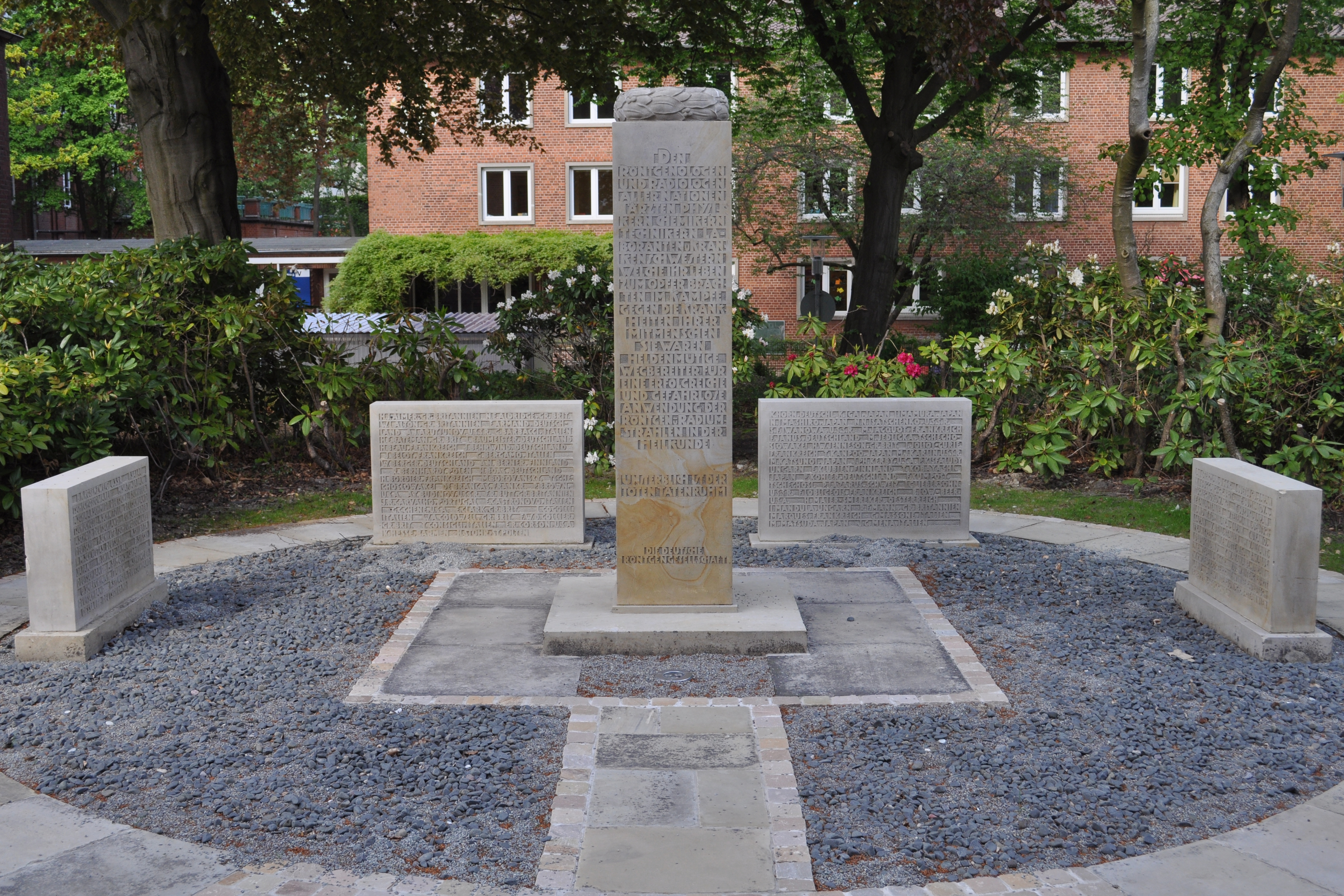
The monument to the Martyrs of Radiology in Hamburg

Cecil Rupert Chaworth Lyster CBE (14 December 1859 – 26 January 1920) was a British physician, electrotherapist and radiologist.

Lyster was the son of Alfred Chaworth Lyster and his wife Elizabeth (née Kennett). He began his career as resident medical officer at Charing Cross Hospital in London and then served as resident obstetrical officer from 1881 to 1882. Following travels in the United States and Europe, he was appointed medical superintendent of the Bolingbroke Hospital in 1885. Specialising in electro-therapeutics and radiology, he became medical officer-in-charge of the Electrical Department of Middlesex Hospital in 1902, while still continuing to work as a doctor at the Bolingbroke Hospital. He held these positions until his death.

Lyster was appointed Commander of the Order of the British Empire (CBE) in January 1920 for his work in the First World War. He married Edith Thompson (died 1919) in 1903; they had no children. Lyster died from cancer caused by exposure to x-rays during his research, the day before his CBE was gazetted. The gazette was later ante-dated to two days before his death.

His name is included on the Monument to the X-ray and Radium Martyrs of All Nations erected in Hamburg, Germany, in 1936.
