= W. Ironside Bruce =

- Born: 1876
- Died: 1921 (aged 44–45)
- Occupation: Physician
- Medical career
- Field: Radiology
- Institutions: Charing Cross Hospital; Hospital for Sick Children

William Ironside Bruce (1876 – 21 March 1921) was a doctor in Europe who conducted early research on the use of X-rays. He headed the X-ray departments at Charing Cross Hospital and at the Hospital for Sick Children. He wrote an early book on X-ray techniques and he was president of the radiology section of the Royal Society of Medicine.

In 1921, Bruce was diagnosed with aplastic anaemia, which his physicians attributed to his work with X-rays. He died two months after being diagnosed with the illness. Bruce's death led to the establishment of an X-ray safety committee in Great Britain.

== Early life ==
Bruce was born in Dingwall, the second son of William Bruce, an Aberdeenshire doctor. His uncle was John Mitchell Bruce, a physician who wrote a widely read textbook, Materia Medica and Therapeutics. He was a cousin of Edmund Ironside, 1st Baron Ironside. Many members of the Bruce and Ironside families had come from Keig, a quiet village in Aberdeenshire. Though Bruce was not born there, he received his education in Aberdeen, in the tradition of these relatives.

Bruce completed medical school in 1900 at the University of Aberdeen. After medical school he served in the South African Field Force and he became interested in the applications of X-ray to the management of war injuries. He contracted typhoid fever during his military service, and this caused chronic health problems.

== Career ==
After his military service, Bruce became an assistant to Sir James Mackenzie Davidson, a doctor at Charing Cross Hospital and the first radiologist to achieve knighthood. Davidson was an ophthalmologist-turned-radiologist who had gone to Würzburg to receive his X-ray training from Wilhelm Röntgen in the 1890s. Bruce worked for the hospital until his death. He also taught at Charing Cross Hospital Medical School. When Davidson retired, Bruce became the head of the X-ray department at Charing Cross Hospital.

Bruce was also the second radiographer at the Hospital for Sick Children. He worked with powerful X-ray tubes that he thought would be more useful in treating cancers and blood diseases. In 1906, he published an article in The Lancet about ongoing radiation treatment that he was providing to two leukaemia patients.

Early in his career, Bruce wrote a book, A System of Radiography, with an Atlas of the Normal, which was favorably reviewed in the Dublin Journal of Medical Science. He later devised a special type of X-ray couch with lead shielding, and he began to caution against the previous setups that required exposure of the radiographer's lower body to the X-ray beam, but he is thought to have been exposed to large amounts of radiation by that time. Bruce lectured to the students studying for the medical radiology diploma at Cambridge University. When Rudyard Kipling became ill in 1918, he carried out Kipling's X-ray examination. He was a member of the Royal Society of Medicine and had been president of the group's Section of Radiology. He had become president of the Section of Radiology and Electrotherapeutics of the British Medical Association in 1921.

== Death ==
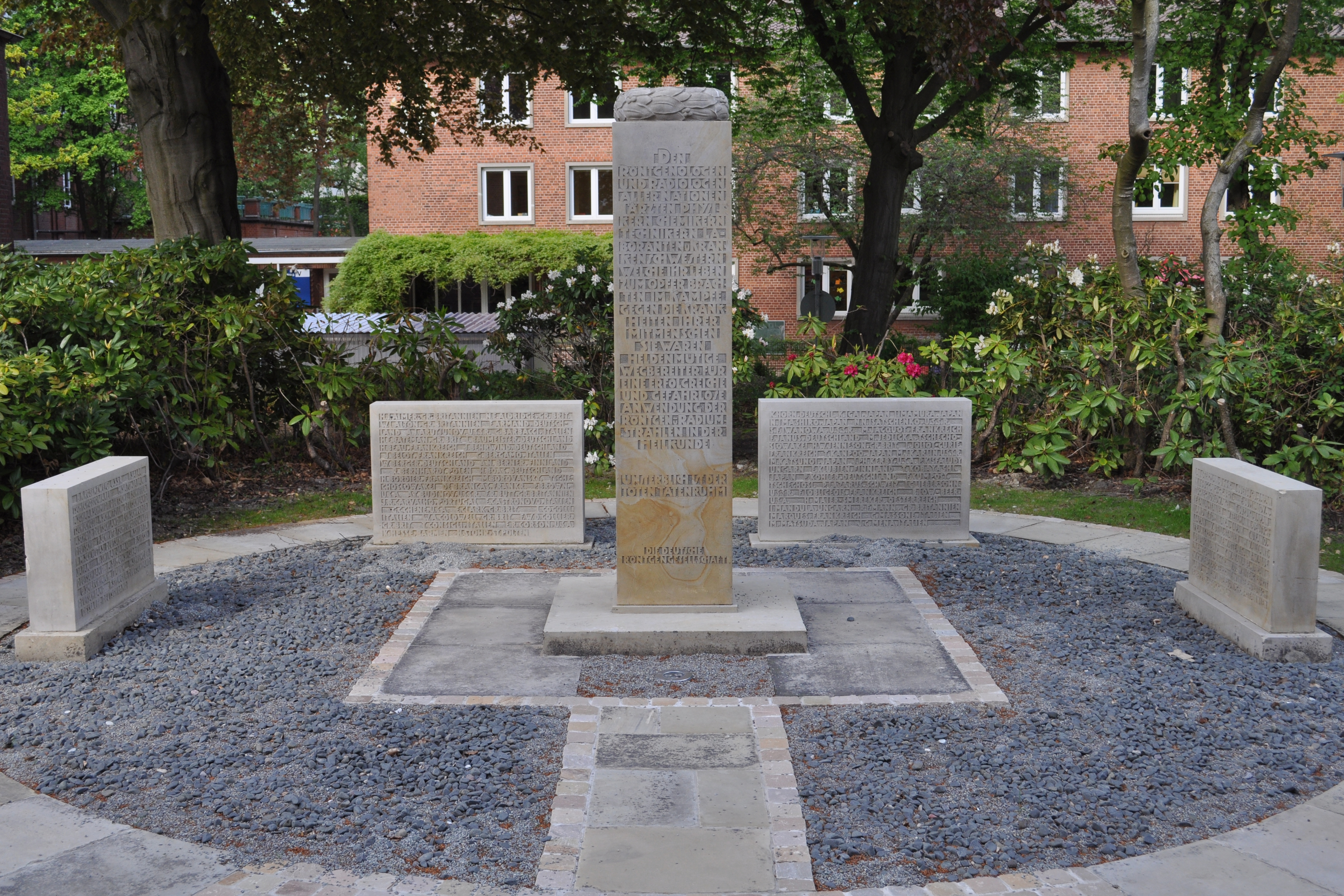
The monument to the Martyrs of Radiology in Hamburg

Bruce became ill in January 1921, and he was diagnosed with aplastic anaemia. By the time Bruce got sick, the disease had also been noted among several people in Italy who worked with X-rays or radium. When he was advised to retire from X-ray work and move to the country, Bruce wrote a letter to a colleague asking if he knew of anyone who would be interested in taking over his X-ray practice.

Despite undergoing a blood transfusion and other treatment, Bruce died at his home on 21 March of that year. Even a week before his death, he remained optimistic that he would soon be able to return to lecture on radiology topics. Buckingham Palace sent a letter expressing condolences.

Bruce's death aroused public concern about the effects of radiation exposure, leading to the founding of the British X-Ray and Radium Protection Committee, which was headquartered in London. In 1936, the Monument to the X-ray and Radium Martyrs of All Nations was created in Hamburg to honor Bruce and 168 other people who died or suffered serious injury because of the early work they performed with X-rays.
