= François Marie Alfred Molteni =

French scientist and optician

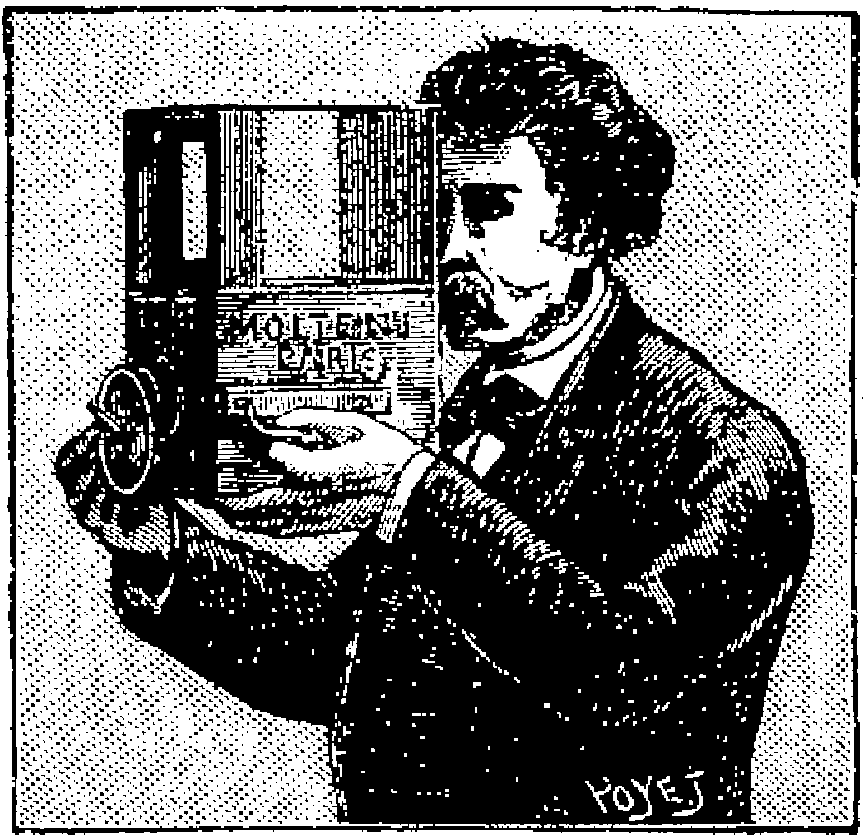
Image of one of the early Molteni devices, from Les Merveilles de la science, 1867 - 1891

François Marie Alfred Molteni (25 November 1837 in Paris – 24 November 1907) was a Parisian scientist and optician.

== Biography ==
Born in Paris, he was one of three children of Pierre Marie Joseph Molteni (1811–1852) and Maria Elisa Clara Houllier, and the grandson of the great optician Antoine Molteni. His family were immigrants to France from the north of Italy.

His uncle Jules Molteno and his grandfather brought him into the family firm at the age of 15, after his father's death. On 21 January 1863, they created the firm "J. &. A. Molteni" for the manufacture of precision instruments, under the ownership of Alfred Molteni (n°9 de la rue des Petits Hôtels) and Jules Molteno (n°62 de la rue du Château d’Eau). Already from 1865, the dynamic Alfred played the most active role, and after Jules died on 25 May 1876, he directed the firm alone.

Alfred Molteni authored numerous technical works and papers. His 1878 works on projection went into many editions. He was also responsible for a large range of inventions in the field of optics, projection and related fields. He was president of honour of the "Chambre Syndicale de la Photographie", recipient of numerous awards and diplomas from around Europe, and knight of the Legion of Honour(Feb. 1898).

Under his direction, the Molteni firm shared with Duboscq the dominant position in the European market. It was also the favoured manufacturer of the equipment for many of the greatest scientists of the time. The majority of his time, however, was spent designing light projection systems. He created innumerable devices and over 12,000 screenings for conferences and events. In the 1890s, he began working with the Lumière brothers on the equipment for some of the first motion pictures.

His downfall occurred at the height of his career. A product he sold (the 1894 oxyéthérique "securitas" lamp), after initially being a great success in the first cinematograph films of 1897, was involved in a disastrous fire. During the Bazar de la Charité event, one of these lamps was brought in for the spectacles. Fatally, during the show, the projectionist pulled open the lamp to access the ether. At the same time, the assistant leaned over and struck a match. The resulting fire spread and killed 126 people. Molteni was overwhelmed by the catastrophe. Believing his product was responsible, he renounced his career and handed over his firm to Radiguet and Massiot in 1899. He moved to Tours, where he died a few years later. Reconstituted under Radiguet and Massiot, the firm remains the leading French manufacturer of scientific materials.

« Monsieur A. MOLTENI vient de mourir à Tours où il s’était retiré depuis quelques années auprès de ses enfants, après avoir fourni une carrière de plus de 50 ans dans la maison universellement connue d’optique et d’instruments de mathématiques et géodésie fondée par son grand-père en 1782 ». Extract from obituary, La Nature, 14 December 1907.
