= Jean Bergonié =

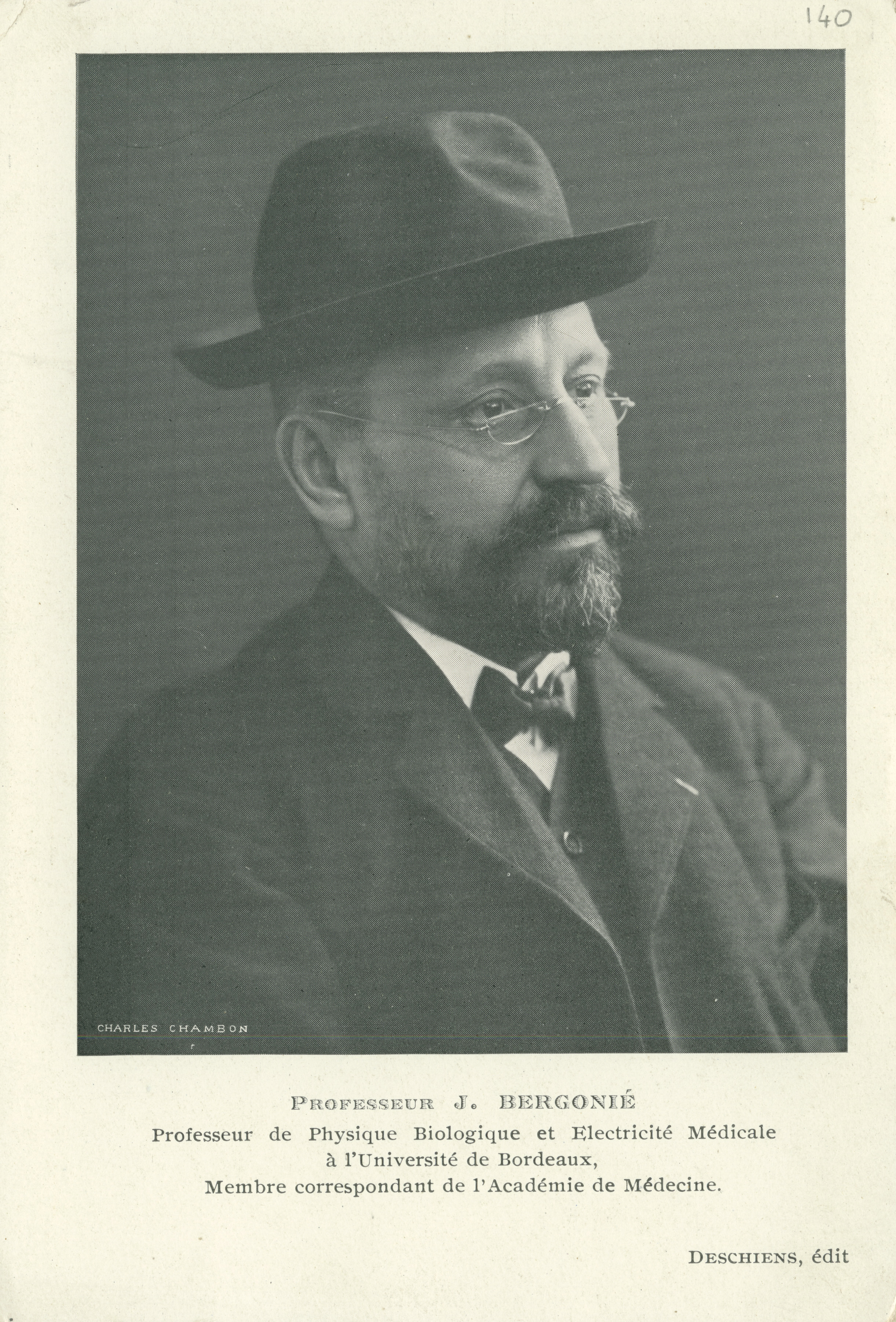
Jean Bergonié

Jean Alban Bergonié (born 1 October 1857 in Casseneuil, died 2 January 1925), was a French oncologist.

The Bergonié Institute - a regional centre cancer research in Bordeaux was founded by him.

His name is included on the Monument to the X-ray and Radium Martyrs of All Nations erected in Hamburg, Germany in 1936.

== Sources ==
- Jean Bergonié, par Bernard Hoerni, Éd. Glyphe, 2007, ISBN 978-2-35285-015-1.
