= Heinrich Albers-Schönberg =

German gynecologist and radiologist

Heinrich Ernst Albers-Schönberg
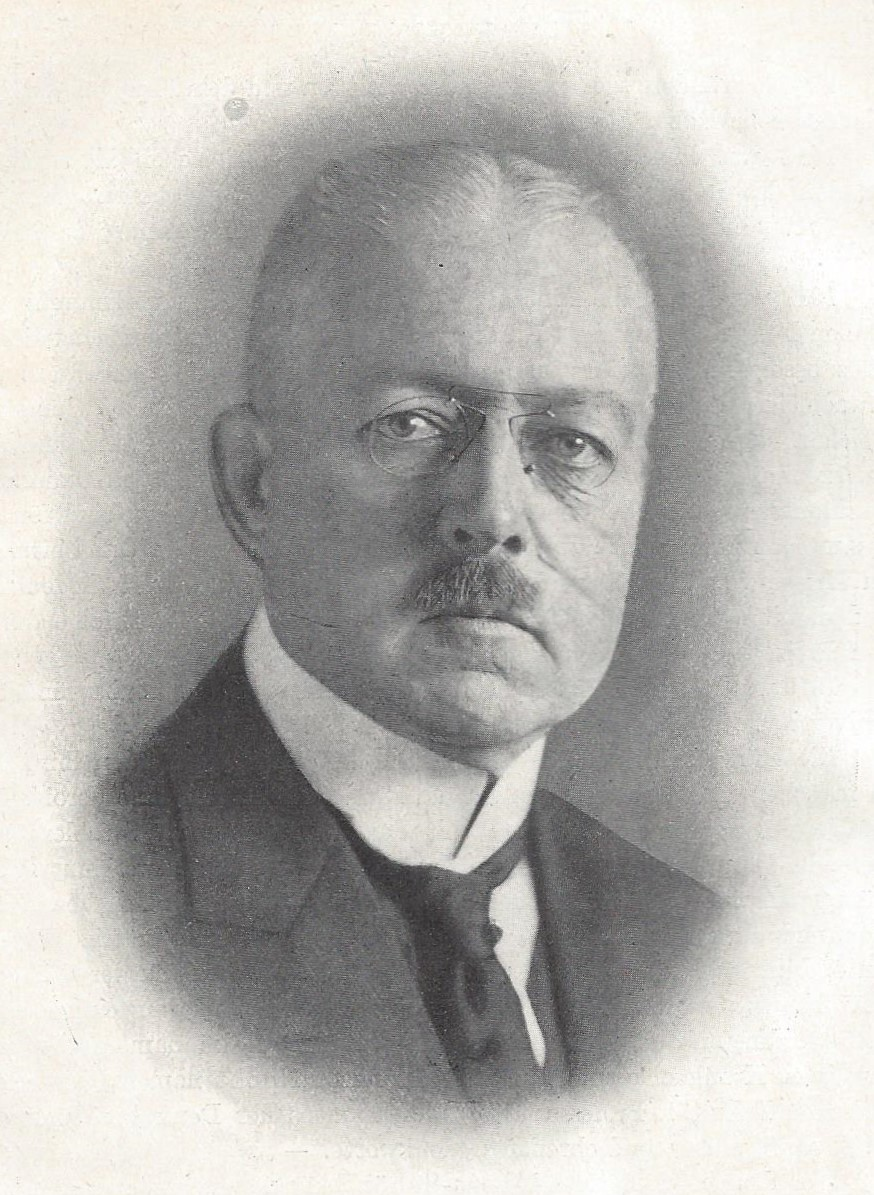
- Born: 21 January 1865; Hamburg, German Confederation
- Died: 4 June 1921 (aged 56)
- Education: University of Tübingen; Leipzig University

Heinrich Ernst Albers-Schönberg (21 January 1865 – 4 June 1921) was a German gynecologist and radiologist. He was a native of Hamburg.

He studied medicine at the Universities of Tübingen and Leipzig, where in 1891 he earned his medical doctorate under the guidance of Heinrich Curschmann (1846-1910). From 1892 to 1894 he was an assistant at Hamburg-Eppendorf Hospital, afterwards working as an assistant to gynecologist Paul Zweifel (1848–1927) at the University of Leipzig. Soon afterwards, he settled in Hamburg as a medical practitioner.

In 1897, with internist Georg Deycke (1865–1938), he established an X-ray clinic and laboratory in Hamburg. Later, he was appointed head of the radiology department at St Georg Hospital. In 1919 he became a full professor and chair of radiology at the newly established University of Hamburg.

Albers-Schönberg is credited with providing a description of osteopetrosis, a condition sometimes referred to as "Albers-Schönberg disease". It is described as a syndrome of excessive bone calcification causing a marble-like appearance with increased radiological density of the skeleton.

He was an early specialist in the field of radiological medicine. In 1903 he discovered that exposure to radiation caused damage to the reproductive glands of rabbits. In cooperation with other scientists, he helped bring about numerous technical innovations into the field of radiology. He is credited with the introduction of radiation protection devices, procedures and equipment for radiation/dose assessment, the "orthoroentgenograph", and the compression diaphragm. He received a grand prize at the 1904 World's Fair in St. Louis; his diagnostic X-ray pictures far outclassed the competition in regards to clarity.

In 1903 he published his best known work, a book on radiological techniques called Die Röntgentechnik - Lehrbuch für Ärzte und Studierende (sixth edition, 1941). In 1905 he was a founding member of the Deutsche Röntgen-Gesellschaft (German Radiological Society). With Georg Deycke, he founded the journal Fortschritte auf dem Gebiete der Röntgenstrahlen.

His name is included on the Monument to the X-ray and Radium Martyrs of All Nations erected in Hamburg in 1936.
