= Antoine Molteni =

Pierre François Antoine Molteni (French: [pjɛʁ fʁɑ̃swa ɑ̃twan mɔlteni], Italian: [molˈteːni]; 1786 – 7 January 1866), also known as Antoine Molteno or François Molteno, was a manufacturer and trader in optical instruments and other scientific equipment, who built the first devices used by Louis Daguerre and founded the "Maison Molteni" in Paris.

== Joseph Antoine Balthazard Molteno (1746-1808) ==
Antoine Molteni was the son of Italian immigrant Joseph Antoine Balthazard Molteno (1746/7-1808).

His family was from the Milan area. However, he was born in Bern, Switzerland in 1746 or 47, originally as Giuseppe Molteno. He travelled to Amsterdam in about 1765 and sold barometers for several years, usually under the name Joseph Molten. He married Johanna ("Jannetjie") Allen in 1767. The couple had two sons and a daughter, Maria Hendrina (Marie-Henriette), but later separated. He came to Paris and began trading in optical instruments in 1782 in rue Sainte-Apolline. He and his wife separated at this time too. Joseph Antoine Molteno was instrumental in the creation of the Robertson fantoscope, and when he died on 4 April 1808 (aged 62), he passed on the business to his son Antoine.

Italian surnames were changing at the time, as the older system of male, female, and plural suffixes gradually gave way to the modern system whereby the plural "-i" suffix is used consistently throughout. The family therefore used both variants of their surname - Molteno and Molteni.

== Antoine Molteni - Career ==
From his premises at 11 rue du Coq Saint-Honoré, Molteni ran his enterprise for the coming decades, from what became known as the "Maison Molteni". On 2 April 1817 he drastically expanded the company, together with Joseph Duroni, to include further workshops and stores such as at Palais-Royal. Molteni began working closely with Louis Daguerre in the 1830s, after they were introduced by Alphonse Giroux.

Molteni made the first devices used by Daguerre in 1839, and they continued to work together until the Molteni family moved to the new No. 36 rue Saint-Nicolas in 1846 (which became No. 62 rue du Château d'Eau in 1851). They kept their strong interest in photography, but expanded to include a range of precision instruments. Their factory and warehouses were located on the same street, where their steam engines, rolling mills and metal smelters served the laboratories and manufacturing lines.

The Molteni family also designed and built naval & marine instruments, mathematical, geodesic and measuring devices, photography apparatus and many of the early lighting systems.

Antoine Molteni married Marie Madeleine Alexandrine Sauclières (d. 26 Jan 1855), and the couple had two sons: Pierre Marie Joseph and Louis Jules, and a daughter Joséphine Émilie (married the merchant Jacques Eusèbe Pougeois).

== Successors ==
From 24 December 1836, Antoine brought his eldest son Pierre Marie Joseph Molteni (1811-1852) into active management of the business. He then brought an employee who was very close to the family, Ferdinand Siegler, in as a partner in September 1841.

The result was the founding of Molteni and Co. ("Molteni & Cie") on 2 September 1841, a firm dedicated to the design and manufacture of optics, physics and mathematical equipment. Meanwhile, his second son, Jules Molteni, launched an unprecedented expansion in 1843. New stores opened at 62 Rue du Chateau-d'Eau in 1852 and 53 (later to move up the street to number 44 in 1872).

Joseph Molteni died (aged 62) on 10 December 1852, and Jules ran the firm alone for a while, under Antoine's guidance.

In 1863, Jules and his elderly father brought Joseph's son François Marie Alfred Molteni (1837 - 1907), and the firm became known as "J. &. A. Molteni". Already from 1865, the dynamic Alfred played the most active role, and after Jules died on 25 May 1876, he directed the firm alone until 1899, when he handed it over to Radiguet and Massiot in 1899. The firm remains the leading French manufacturer of scientific materials.

The family's tomb, under a small obelisk, is in the Cemetery of Pere Lachaise
