= Monument to the X-ray and Radium Martyrs of All Nations =

Monument

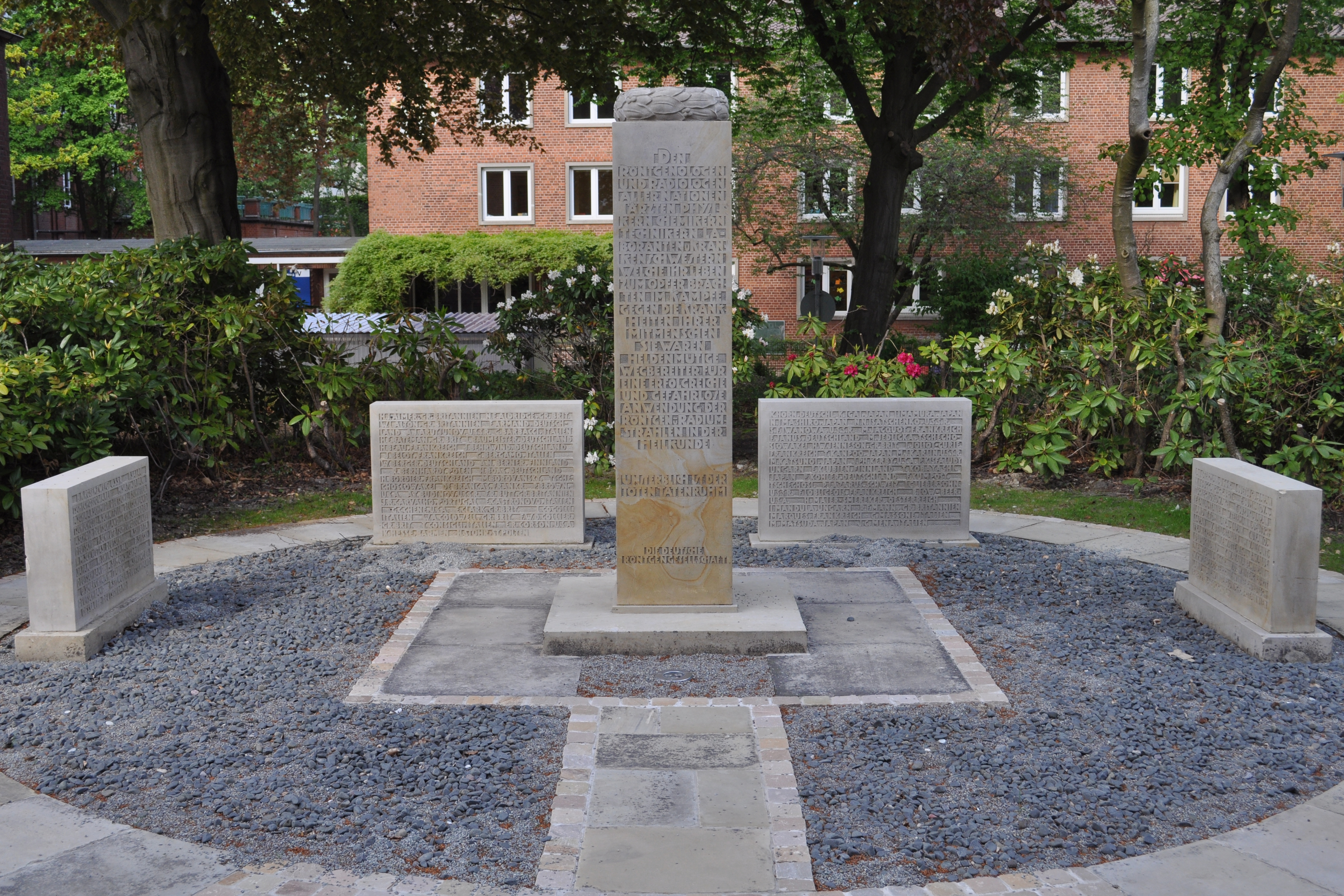
- Interactive map of Monument to the X-ray and Radium Martyrs of All Nations
- Location: St George's Hospital, St Georg, Hamburg, Germany
- Coordinates: 53.559082°N 10.019790°E
- Completion date: 4 April 1936
- Dedicated to: Early radiology workers who died as a result

The Monument to the X-ray and Radium Martyrs of All Nations (also known as the X-ray Martyrs' Memorial) is a memorial in Hamburg, Germany, commemorating those who died due to their work with the use of radiation, particularly X-rays, in medicine. It was unveiled on the grounds of St Georg (St George's) Hospital (now the Asklepios Klinik St Georg), on 4 April 1936 by the Deutsche Röntgengesellschaft (the Röntgen Society of Germany).

When unveiled, the memorial included 169 names, from fifteen nations, listed alphabetically; by 1959 there were 359, with the additions listed on four separate stone plaques, beside the original columnar stone memorial.

== Inscription ==
The memorial's inscription may be translated as:

To the Roentgenologists and radiologists of all nations,
To the doctors, physicists, chemists, technicians, laboratory assistants and nurses
who sacrificed their lives in the fight against disease.
They were valiant pioneers in the effective
and safe use of X-rays and radium in medicine.
Immortal is the glory of the work of the dead.

== Book ==
An accompanying book, Ehrenbuch der Radiologen aller Nationen (Book of Honour of radiologists of all nations) gives biographies of those commemorated. Three editions have been produced, the most recent in 1992.

== Names ==
The names of those commemorated include:

- Heinrich Albers-Schönberg (1865–1921)
- Gustav Baer (1865–1925)
- Frederick Henry Baetjer (1874–1933)
- Burton Eugene Baker (1871–1913)
- Leonhard Baumeister (1874–1953)
- Eugen Beaujard (1874–1937)
- Jean Bergonié (1857–1925)
- Elis Berven (1885–1966)
- Reginald Blackall (-1925)
- Barry Blacken
- Joseph Boine (1883–1935)
- Percy Brown (?–1950)
- William Ironside Bruce (1879–1921)
- Eugene Wilson Caldwell (1870–1918)
- Joaquim Roberto Cavalho (1893–1944)
- Felipe Carriazo (1854–1919)
- Edmond Castex (1868–1931)
- Ettore Castronovo (1894–1954)
- Alfred Cerné (1856–1937)
- Frederick W. D. Collier
- Antonio Coppola (?–1922)
- Marie Curie (1867-1934)
- Alois Czepa (1886–1931)
- Fritz Dautwitz (1877–1932)
- Friedrich Dessauer (1881–1963)
- Étienne Destot (1864–1918)
- Walter Dodd (-1916)
- Jonn Duken (1889–1954)
- Gyula Elischer von Thurzóbánya (1875–1929)
- Arthur W. Erskine (1885–1952)
- Johan Frederik Fischer (1868–1922)
- Frederick R. Forster
- William Hope Fowler (1876–1933)
- Shigeo Furuya (1891–1955)
- Fritz Giesel (1852–1927)
- Hermann Gocht (1869–1938)
- Maximilian Gortan (1873–ca. 1936)
- Fedor Haenisch (1874–1952)
- John Hall-Edwards (1858–1926)
- Anna Hamann (1894–1969)
- Joseph Gilbert Hamilton (1907–1957)
- Georges Haret (1874–1932)
- H. Harris
- Georg Heber (1872–1931)
- Guido Holzknecht (1872–1931)
- Hermann Hopf (-after 1928)
- Friedrich Janus (1875–1951)
- Rudolf Jedlička (1869–1926)
- Irène Joliot-Curie (1897–1956)
- James Philip Kerby (1886–1952)
- Friedrich Wilhelm Klingelfuss (1859–1932)
- Paul Lazarus (1873–1957)
- Charles Lester Leonard (1861–1913)
- Adolphe Leray (1865–1926)
- Max Levy-Dorn (1863–1929)
- Félix Lobligeois (1874–1941)
- Bertram V. A. Low-Beer (1900–1955)
- Cecil Lyster (1859–1920)
- Robert Hermann Machlett (1872–1926)
- Hilde Maier-Smereker (1893–1954)
- Stanley Melville (1867–1934)
- Lawrie Morrison (-1933)
- José Casimiro Carteado Mena (1876–1949)
- Carl Heinrich Florenz Müller (1845–1912)
- John Murphy (1885–1944)
- Takashi Nagai (1908–1951)
- George Harrison Orton (1873–1947)
- Ernest Payne (?–1936)
- George Alexander Pirie
- Mario Ponzio (1885–1956)
- Arthur Radiguet (1850-1905)
- James R. Riddell
- Blandina Ridder (1871–1916)
- Heber Robarts (1852–1922)
- Jacob Rosenblatt (1872–1928)
- Francis Le Roy Satterlee (1881–1935)
- Arthur Schaarschmidt (1879-1959)
- Erno Schiffer (1893-1951)
- Otto Schreiber (1882–1925)
- Fumiyo Shimadzu (1902–1967)
- Ernst Sommer (1872–1938)
- Adrien Celestin Marie Soret (?–1929)
- John W. L. Spence (1870-1930)
- Itsuma Suetsugu (1893–1965)
- Auguste-Jean-Baptiste Tauleigne (–1926)
- Benjamin Franklin Thomas (1850–1911)
- Dawson Turner (1857-1928)
- Tamonji Urano (1886–1954)
- Charles Vaillant (1872–1942)
- Ivanova-Podobed Sofia Vasilievna (1887–1953)
- Harry Fuller Waite (1872–1946)
- Hugh Walsham
- Louis Andrew Weigel (1854–1906)
- John Duncan White (?–1955)
- John Chisholm Williams
- Ernest Wilson (1871-1911)
- J. Young
