= Radiguet et Fils =

French manufacturer of scientific equipment

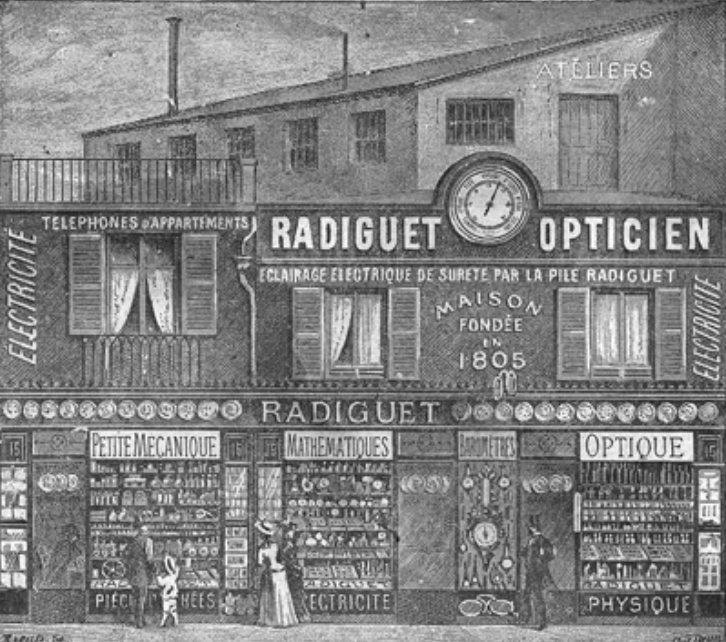
Storefront, 13-15 boulevard des Filles-du-Calvaire, before 1899.

Radiguet et Fils (stylized Radiguet & Fils; English: "Radiguet and Son") was a French manufacturer of precision scientific instruments, established in 1805.

According to a history of the firm published in L'Industrie parisienne in 1888, the company was founded in 1805 by a Madame Collot. Ownership then passed to Louis Chevalier (c.1778-1848), younger brother of Vincent Chevalier. In 1830, Chevalier left the company to Honoré-Marie Radiguet (1791-1867), who had once worked as Chevalier's apprentice, and who had made a name for himself in the production of optical equipment, especially parallel mirrors [glaces parallèles] for astronomy and maritime navigation.

Under the management of Honoré-Marie's son, Antoine-Honoré Radiguet (1824-1887), the company's purview expanded to include barometers, thermometers, and other scientific equipment. Antoine-Honoré was president of the Trade Association of Precision Instruments [chambre syndicale des instruments de précision]. Antoine-Honoré's financial investment in the application of parallel mirrors to daguerreotype photography lost the company significant sums, as the problem of image reversal which the introduction of his mirrors was supposed to solve was solved by other means.

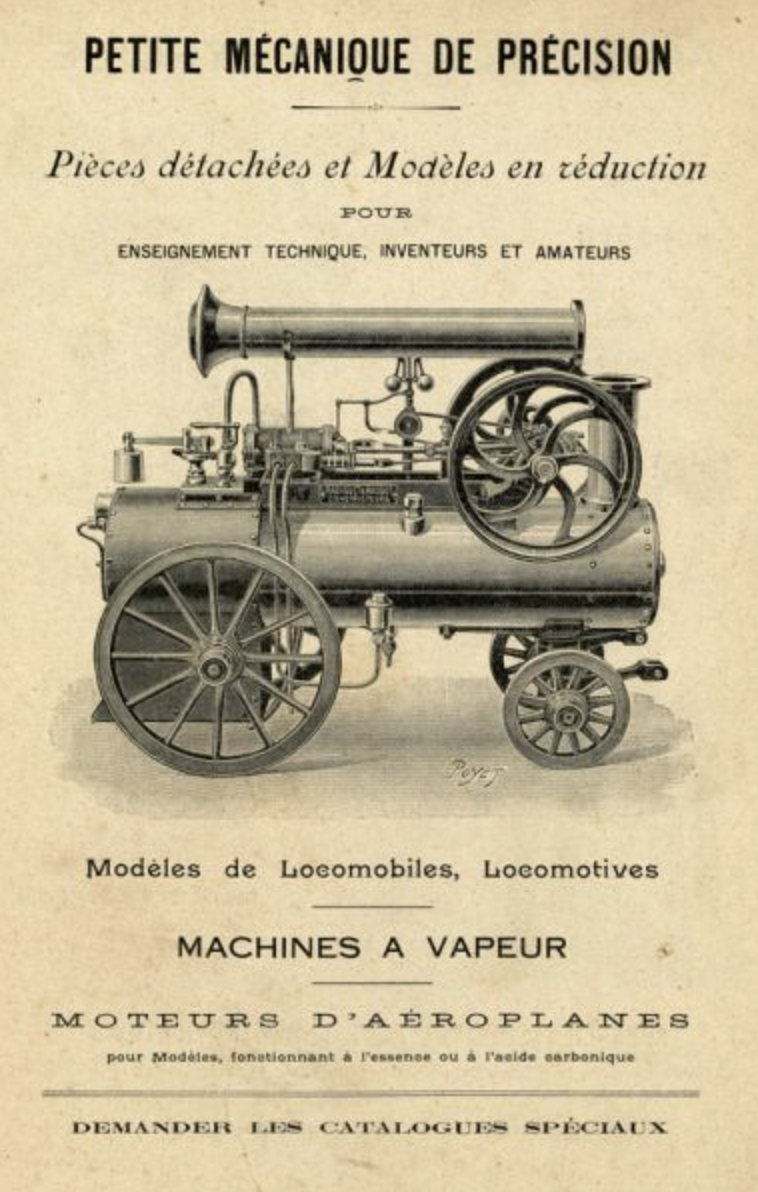
La Petite Mécanique.

Antoine-Honoré and his son Arthur (1850-1905) marketed their company to a broader public through engineering and photography workshops, as well as through a line of scientific toys called La Petite Mécanique. In his book on their toys, Frédéric Marchand credits the Radiguet family with "inventing the concept of the scientific and educational toy [which], developed in accordance with the latest scientific discoveries, became emblematic of the industrial France of an enlightened, modern 19th century." The company was located at 13 and 15, boulevard des Filles-du-Calvaire, Paris, an address inscribed on many of their instruments. Radiguet & Fils was the first to produce the Oudin coil. After Wilhelm Röntgen discovered X-rays, the company became involved in the production of equipment for radiology, especially induction coils.

In 1899, Arthur Radiguet went into business with his son-in-law, Georges Massiot (1875–1962), and from then on the firm went by "Radiguet & Massiot." Radiguet & Massiot absorbed the Molteni company shortly after, and moved to the Molteni workshop at 44, rue du Chateau-d'Eau. Arthur also invented a "Radiguet battery," and was an expert on radiology, creating a filing system for global research on the subject; some of his other inventions included an electric lighter-extinguisher [allumeur-extincteur], which would turn the lights in rooms on and off with the opening and closing of doors, and a siphon for gasoline that worked by blowing rather than sucking. He was a cunning promoter of these innovations.

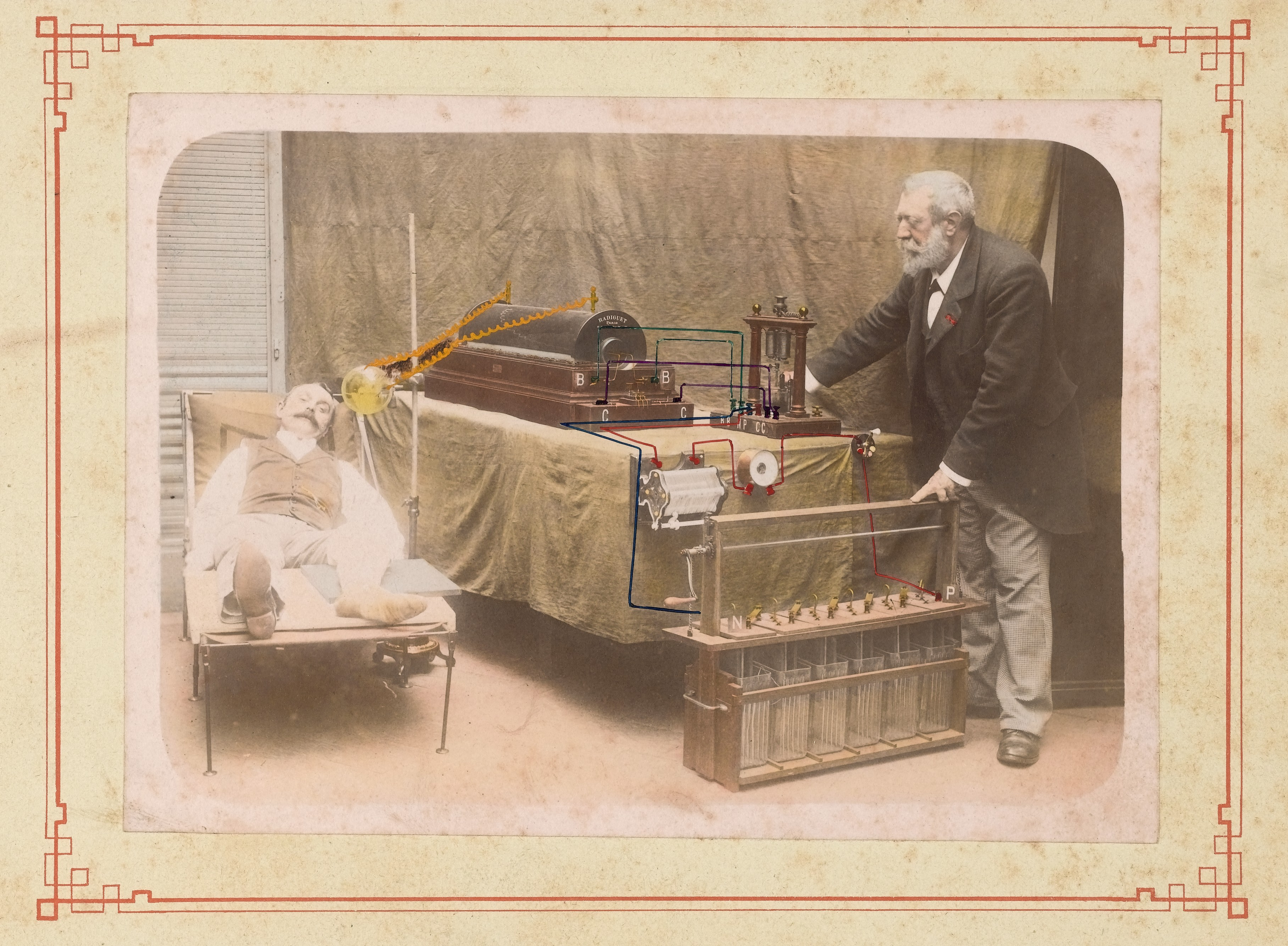
Arthur Radiguet making a radiograph (before 1905).

Arthur Radiguet died in 1905 from one of the first cases of radiodermatitis seen in France; two moldings of his hands, showing an aggravating lesion on the left little finger, are preserved at the wax museum of the Hôpital Saint-Louis (no. 2448 in the museum catalogue). Two studies in the Bulletin de la Societé française de Dermatologie et de Syphiligraphie are devoted to his case. Radiguet's name is engraved on the Monument to the X-ray and Radium Martyrs of All Nations in Hamburg, Germany.

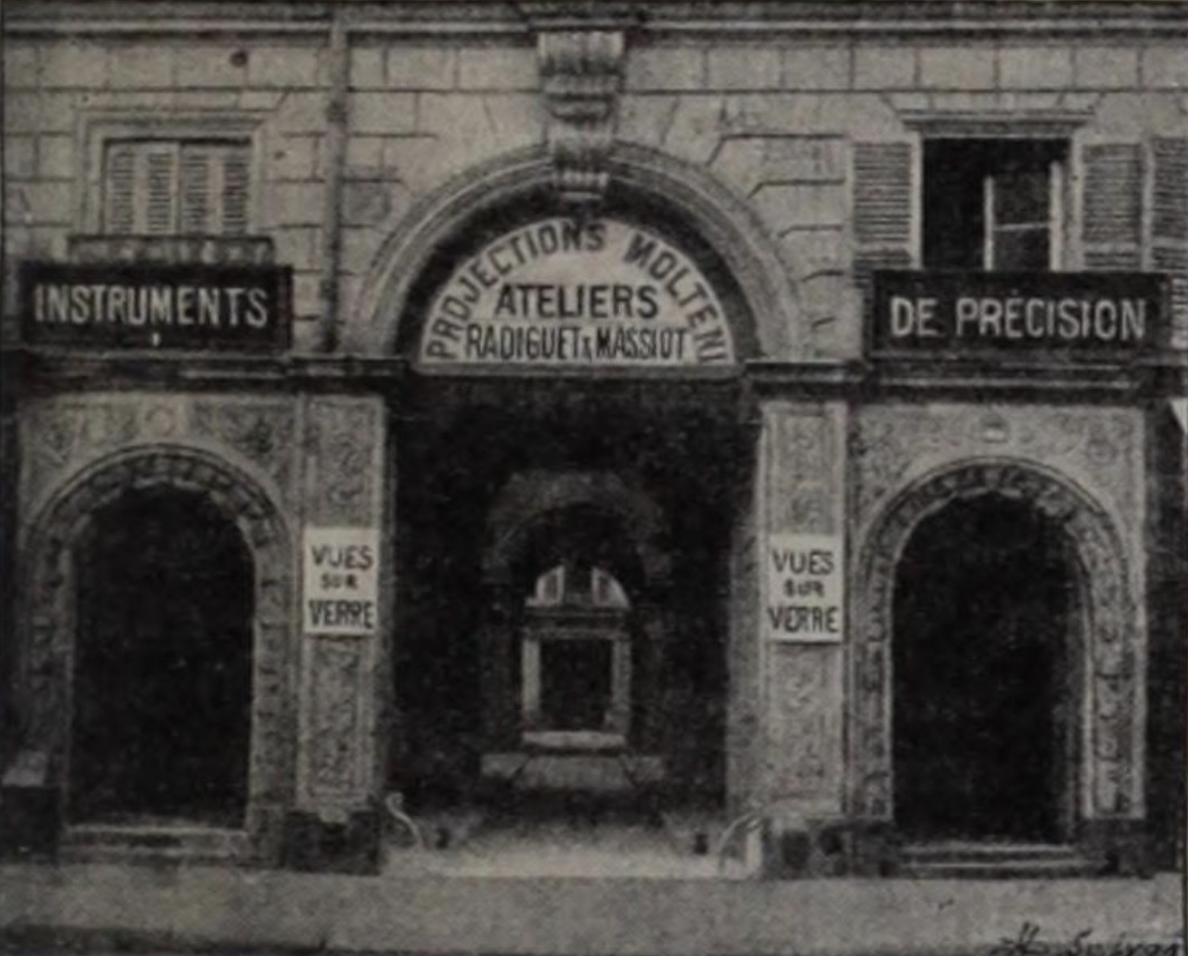
Radiguet & Massiot Workshop, 44 rue du Château-d'Eau, c.1900.

In 1910 the firm, now named Massiot & Cie ["Massiot and Co."], moved from Paris to Courbevoie. During the first half of the 20th century, the firm played an important role in the development of radiology. In 1902, Radiguet & Massiot collaborated with Dr. Hyacinthe Guilleminot to produce a bed design that resolved prior issues with radiographic imaging of a horizontal patient. During World War I, Massiot & Cie worked with Guilleminot on an automobile radiology device, which never saw use. In 1936, Massiot & Cie produced the first commercial tomography machine, and in 1951 they manufactured the first production model for the polytome. Georges Massiot retired at the end of World War II, leaving management of the firm to his sons Jean and Marcel, the latter of whom died soon after in 1946.

The Didot-Bodin trade directory for 1900 lists the company as selling "special devices for science, medicine, schools and industry," giving for examples Leclanché cells, the Radiguet battery, compasses, galvanometers, and radiography equipment. They also sold polarimeters, microscopes, and projection lanterns, and they published a catalogue of educational projection slides. They received gold medals at several World's Fairs, including 1878 and 1900, and were awarded a Grand Prize at the 1905 Liège International Exposition. Massiot & Cie persisted under that name until 1960, when Philips Medical Systems acquired a stake in the firm; the name was changed to Massiot Philips before it was absorbed into the Philips Company in 1988.

Many models of the company's devices, some made by Georges Massiot, others dating from after his death, are conserved at the Centre Antoine Béclère.
