= Thomas William Drinkwater =

Thomas William Drinkwater FRSE LRCPE LRCSE (1852–1940) was a British physician, chemist and early forensic analyst, acting as assistant to Sir Henry Littlejohn. He later served as Public Analyst to Edinburgh, Ross and Cromarty, Inverness and Fortrose.

He was described as short, stout and clean-shaven, and was amicably known as "Drinky".

== Life ==
Drinkwater was born in Ireland in 1852. His family went to England in his youth and he was educated at King's Lynn Grammar School in Norfolk. He studied under Francis Sutton and A.J. Bernays at St Thomas's Hospital in London, working on analytical medical issues then did further studies in Germany.

In 1877, he came to Edinburgh working at Leith Chemical Works whilst also undertaking analytical work for Prof Henry Littlejohn. In his early days in Edinburgh he lived at 6 Preston Street and worked at a laboratory at 19 Marshall Street. From 1878 until 1939, he was lecturer in chemistry at the Royal College of Surgeons of Edinburgh and Royal College of Physicians of Edinburgh and continued well into his eighties. In 1928, a Jubilee Dinner was held in his honour marking 50 years in each college. He also acted as Examiner in Chemistry in both colleges, granting the qualification ChB to innumerable surgeons and physicians.

In 1901, he was elected a Fellow of the Royal Society of Edinburgh. His proposers were Alexander Crum Brown, Hugh Marshall, Leonard Dobbin and David Hepburn.

In later life, he lived at 25 Blacket Place (an attractive house designed by Sir James Gowans) in southern Edinburgh.

He died on 25 January 1940.

== Publications ==
- Synopsis of Chemistry, Inorganic and Organic (1882)
