= Dawson Turner (radiologist) =

British pioneer of radiology

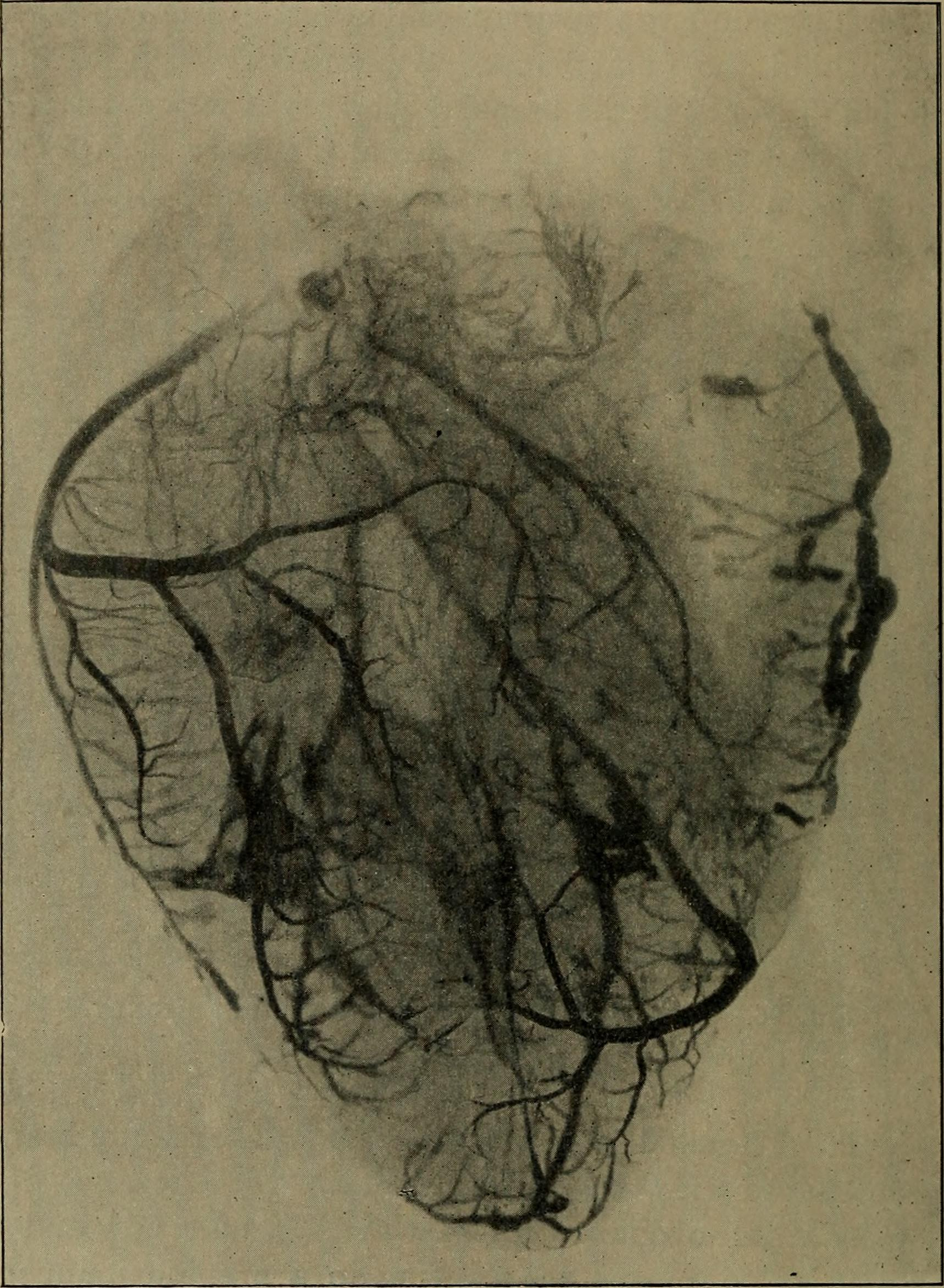
X-ray of the heart by Dawson Turner, 1899

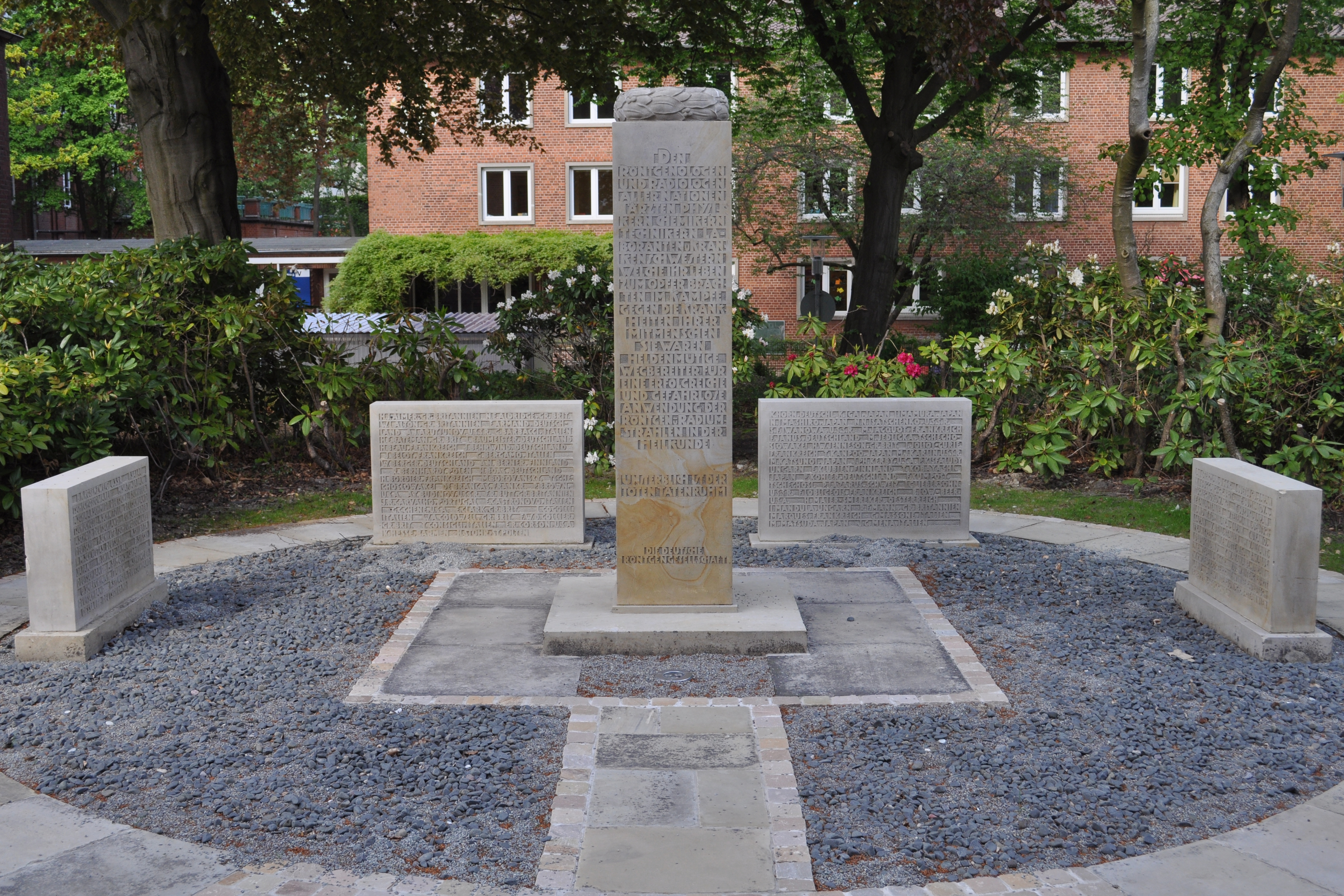
The monument to the Martyrs of Radiology in Hamburg

Dawson Fyers Duckworth Turner, FRSE, FRCPE (1857–1928) was a British pioneer of radiology and patron of the arts, who died of radiation related cancer.

== Early life ==
He was born in Liverpool in 1857 the son of Rev Dawson Turner and attended Shrewsbury School in Shropshire. He then studied at Dalhousie University in Nova Scotia, Canada where he graduated BA in 1884. Returning to Britain Turner studied at Edinburgh University where he graduated in medicine (MB CM with honours) in 1888 and attained his MD 1890. He became MRCPE in 1890 and was elected fellow (FRCPE) in 1891.

== Early medical career ==
After serving as resident physician in the Royal Infirmary of Edinburgh under Sir James Affleck he was appointed Lecturer in Physics at the Edinburgh Extramural School of Medicine at Surgeons' Hall, Edinburgh. In addition he acted as clinical tutor in clinical medicine at the Extramural School at Surgeons' Hall.

== Radiology career ==
When X-rays were discovered by Röntgen in 1895 Dawson Turner was one of the first to appreciate their possible application in medicine. He built an early X-ray apparatus in his home at 32 George Square, Edinburgh. On 5 February 1896 he demonstrated X-rays at a meeting of the Edinburgh Medico-Chirurgical Society. In 1901 he became Physician in Charge of X-Rays at Edinburgh Royal Infirmary remaining in this role until ill-health caused his partial retirement in 1911 from which time he became "Extra Electrician" until his full retirement in 1925.

He was one of the first, in 1902, to use X-rays in the treatment of cancer.

In 1910 he was living at 37 George Square, Edinburgh.

In 1911 he was one of the earliest recorded persons using radium to treat lymphosarcoma. His surgical colleague Alexis Thomson inserted an aluminium case, which enclosed a glass tube containing radium bromide, into the tumour below the clavicle. Turner, over the next few days, exposed the involved lymph nodes above the clavicle to radium bromide contained in a second tube. There was no trace of the tumour when the patient was examined at three months or again at one year after treatment.

== Honours received ==
In 1901 he succeeded William Ivison Macadam as President of the Royal Scottish Society of Arts (RSSA).

In 1906 Turner was elected a Fellow of the Royal Society of Edinburgh. His proposers were James Affleck, Sir William Turner, Cargill Gilston Knott and James Gordon MacGregor.

He was Vice President of the Roentgen Society.

== Later life ==
His Edinburgh address until retiral due to ill-health was 37 George Square. The building was demolished by Edinburgh University in the 1960s to make way for George Square Library.

Early in his career he had lost two fingers of his left hand as a result of exposure to radiation which had also resulted in the loss of an eye. For the last years of his life he did not enjoy good health and his symptoms were presumed to result from radiation exposure. He died of radiation related cancer at Godalming in Surrey on Christmas Day 1928. His is one of the 14 British names of the 169 included on the Monument to the X-ray and Radium Martyrs of All Nations erected in Hamburg, Germany in 1936. In 1931 Edinburgh Royal Infirmary erected a memorial plaque to his memory in the radiology department.

== Family ==
He was married to Emily Barry, daughter of William Barry of Romford.

== Selected publications ==
- Turner, Dawson. A Manual of Practical Medical Electricity: The Röntgen Rays, Finsen Light, Radium and Its Radiations and High-Frequency Currents. New York: William Wood & Co, 1904
- Turner, Dawson F. D. Radium; its Physics and Therapeutics Second Edition, Revised and Enlarged. London. Baillière, Tindall & Cox: London, 1914.
- Turner, Dawson. Some Reflections Based Upon the Work Done in the Electrical Department of the Royal Infirmary, Edinburgh. Journal of the Royal Society of Medicine. 1 (1908): 118–125.
- Turner, Dawson. A Case of Myeloma of the Sternum Treated by Radium. British Medical Journal. 2.2849 (1915): 218
- Turner, Dawson. Cancer and the Roentgen Rays. British Medical Journal. 2.2178 (1902): 976
- Turner, Dawson. Report on the Radium Treatment at the Royal Infirmary, Edinburgh, During the Year 1916. Archives of Radiology and Electrotherapy. 22.8 (1918): 251–257
- Turner, Dawson. The Dosage of Radium. British Medical Journal. 1.3238 (1923): 100-101
