= Shipwrecks of Cape Town =

Ships that were lost or scuttled along the coast

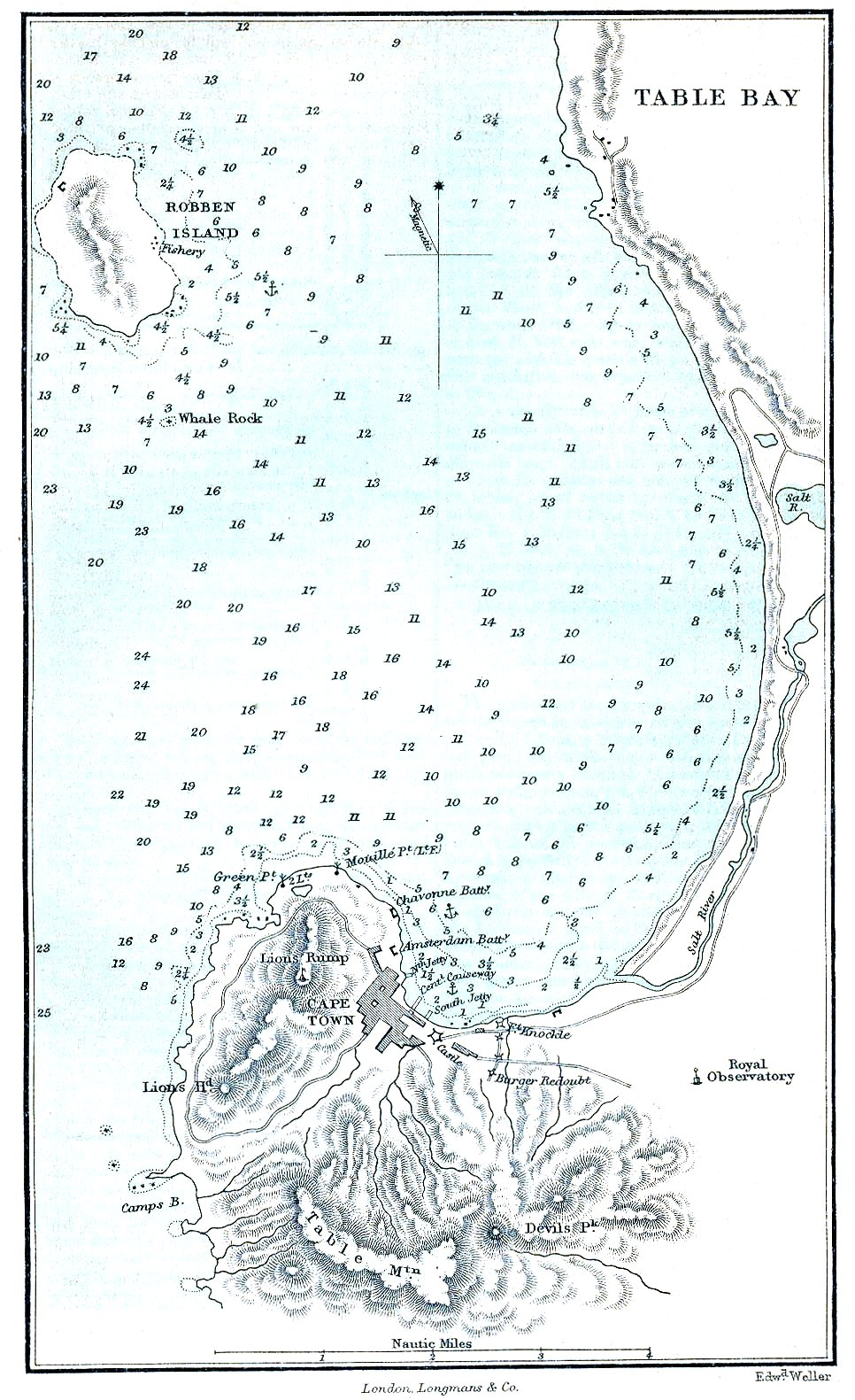
Map of Table Bay (1882)

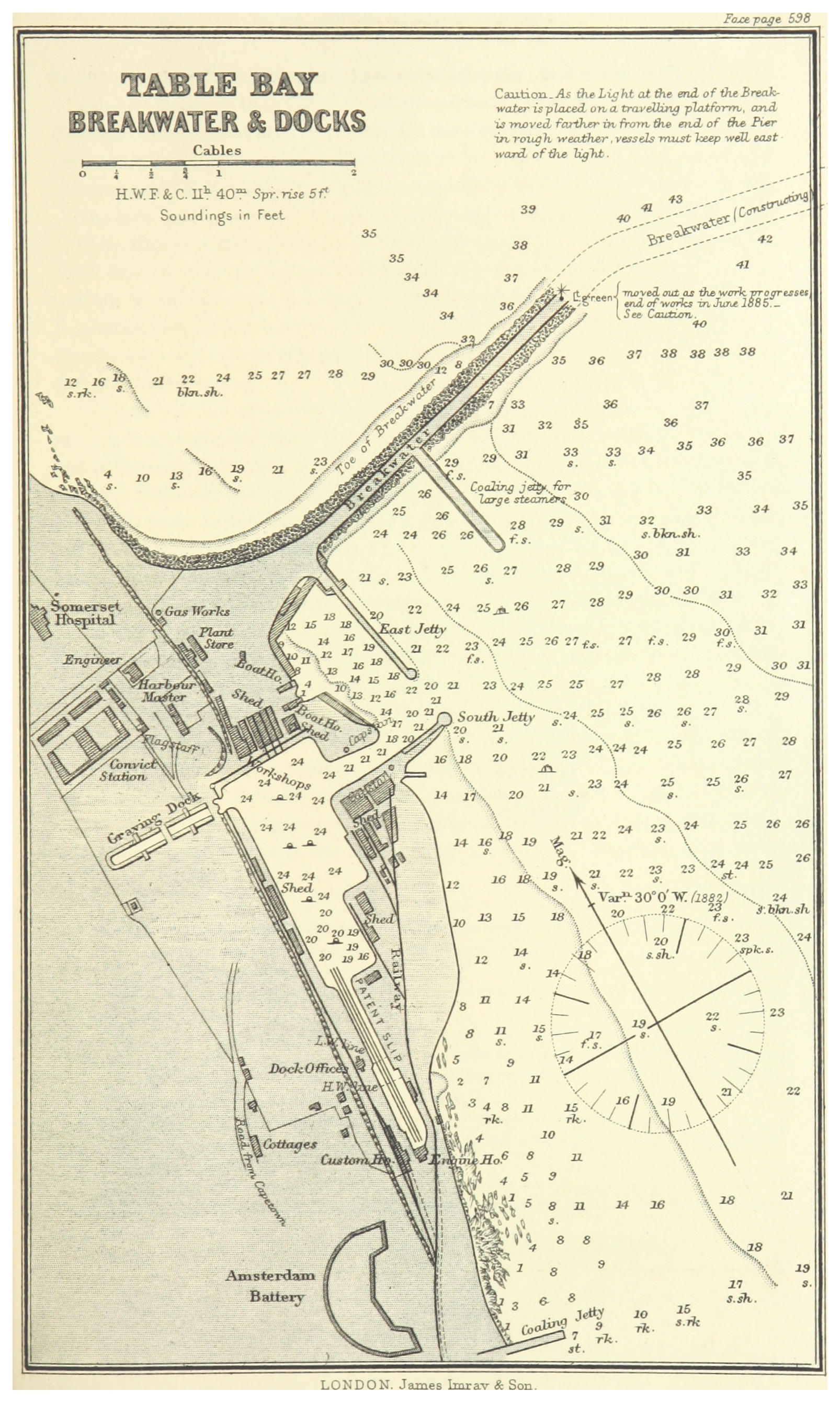
Map of the Docks and Infrastructure (1884)

The Shipwrecks of Cape Town are the shipwrecks in the waters of the Atlantic Ocean in the vicinity of Cape Town, South Africa. They include any wreck that is in the waters off the shores of the City of Cape Town metropolitan area, and those which are now inshore of the high-water mark due to land reclamation, shifting sands, or being cast up by stormy seas. The geographical area extends from Silwerstroomstrand north of Robben Island, Table Bay, around the Cape Peninsula and False Bay to the vicinity of Kogel Bay on the east side of False Bay. Several of these wrecks are suitable sites for recreational scuba diving, and may be described in dive guides for the region. Others are inaccessible due to depth or being on the shore, or buried under sediments or landfill, and some have not yet been found or identified.

Some of the wrecks carried valuable cargo, and where practicable salvage efforts have been made to recover such cargo. On other occasions cargo and fuel have been recovered as far as reasonably practicable to mitigate the effects on the environment of hazardous materials.

Some of the wrecks are classified as historically important and are legally protected as part of the national heritage, and some of these have been studied as archaeological sites.

== Geographical context ==
The coastline of Cape Town is roughly 307 km long, from Silwerstroomstrand at 33°34′14.994″S 18°20′34.959″E on the west coast to slightly south of Kogelbaai at 34°16′10.554″S 18°50′44.905″E on the east coast of False Bay. The coast may be subdivided into the Bloubergstrand (the northern part of the mainland coast), Robben Island, Table Bay, the Atlantic Seaboard (west coast of the north peninsula), Hout Bay and the South Peninsula west coasts, and the False Bay west, north, and east coasts.

The coastline between the large rocky promontory at Bokpunt and Silwerstroomstrand and the harbour wall at the current mouth of the Salt River, is mostly a long sandy beach with a few small, and low rocky promontories. Much of the coastline of Table Bay has been modified by coastal and civil engineering works for the Port of Cape Town. As a consequence a significant number of wreck sites in the region have been covered by land reclamation work between the Salt River mouth and Mouille Point.

=== Hydrographic characteristics ===
Tidal range is moderate, with about 1.8 to 1.9 m range at spring tide on both sides of the peninsula, and tidal currents are negligible.

==== Bathymetry ====
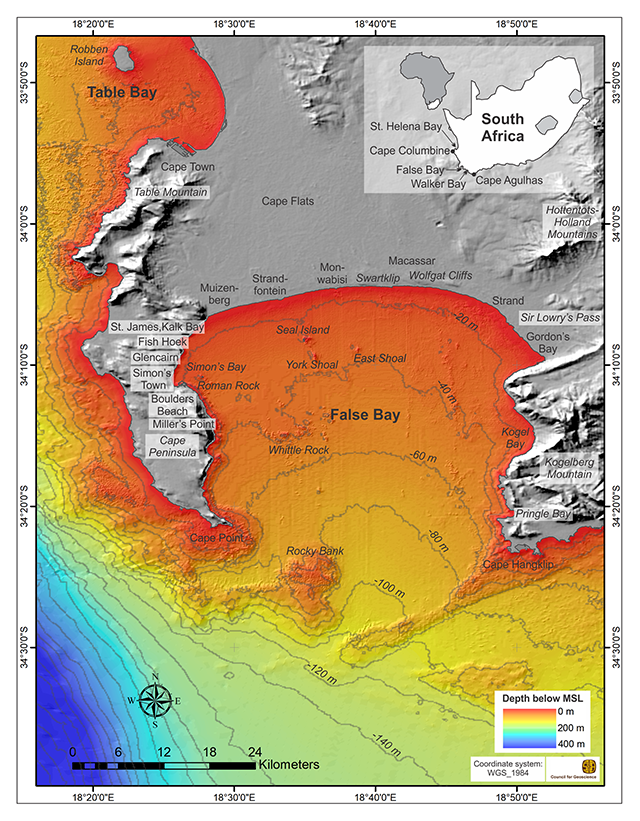
Bathymetry of False Bay and the Cape Peninsula

The bathymetry of False Bay differs in character from the west side of the Cape Peninsula. The west coast seabed tends to slope down more steeply than in False Bay, and although the close inshore waters are also shallow, the 100 m contour is mostly within about 10 km of the west coast, while the entire False Bay is shallower than about 80 m. The bottom of False Bay slopes down relatively gradually from the gently sloping beaches of the north shore to the mouth, and is fairly even in depth from east to west except close to the shorelines. Table Bay is relatively shallow, and slopes gently from east to west, reaching a maximum depth of 35 m at the centre of its mouth. The bottom is mostly fairly low reef of hard shales, slates and sandstone of the Malmesbury group, similar to the shores to the south and north, with extensive patches of fine and coarse sand

=== Navigational hazards ===
- Albatross Rock 34°16.527′S 18°22.210′E (L'Alouette 1817, SS Albatross 1863, RMS Kafir 1878, Star of Africa 1880, SS Umhlali 1909, SS Bia 1917, MV Nolloth 1965)
- Anvil Rock 34°22.218′S 18°31.090′E (Colebrooke 1778)
- Batsata Rock 34°16.602′S 18°28.830′E
- Bellows Rock 34°23.375′S 18°29.425′E (Unity 1859, Paralos 1880, Lusitania 1911)
- Cape Point 34°21′26″S 18°29′51″E
- East Shoal 34°08.900′S 18°38.783′E
- Roman Rock 34°10.87′S 18°27.60′E
- Seal Island 34°08′10″S 18°34′58″E
- Vulcan Rock 34°03.945′S 18°18.545′E
- Whale Rock 33°50.112′S 18°22.858′E (Nieuwe Rhoon 1776, Perseverance 1826, Forfarshire 1864, SS Hypatia 1929, MFV Fong Chung No.11 1975, MV Daeyang Family 1986, MFV Afrikaner 1993)
- Whittle Rock 34°14.846′S 18°33.714′E
- York Shoal 34°09.367′S 18°35.583′E

=== Weather patterns ===
Cape Town has a Mediterranean climate (Köppen: Csb, bordering Csa), with mild, moderately wet winters and dry, warm summers. Winter, which lasts from June to September, may see large cold fronts entering for limited periods from the Atlantic Ocean with significant precipitation and strong north-westerly winds. Winter months in the city average a maximum of 18 °C (64 °F) and minimum of 8.5 °C (47 °F).

Summer, which lasts from December to March, is warm and dry with an average maximum of 26 °C (79 °F) and minimum of 16 °C (61 °F). The region can get uncomfortably hot when the Berg Wind, meaning "mountain wind", blows from the Karoo interior.

Spring and summer generally feature a strong wind from the south-east. This wind is caused by a persistent high-pressure system over the South Atlantic to the west of Cape Town, known as the South Atlantic High, which shifts latitude seasonally, following the sun, and influencing the strength of the fronts and their northward reach. Cape Town receives about 3,100 hours of sunshine per year.

Unlike other parts of the country the city does not have many thunderstorms, and most of those that do occur, happen around October to December and March to April.

==== Winds ====
The winds have a strong influence on the waves and water circulation. The wind follows a characteristic pattern, which shifts in latitude with the seasons and follows the Rossby waves as they move eastwards over the southern ocean. A southwesterly wind follows the passage of a cold front as the anticyclone moves east and merges with the South Atlantic High, producing strong south-easterly winds. The high pressure cell moves further over the tip of Africa and splits off the South Atlantic High, with weakening south easterly winds, followed by a coastal low with north-westerly wind before the next cold front, bringing cool, wet westerly wind which passes around Table Mountain and converges as a northerly wind over False Bay.

The South Atlantic High shifts latitude with the seasons, following the sun, and this causes a large variation in the wind pattern over the passage of the year. In summer it moves south and the south-easterly winds dominate, and on average are strongest during January and February. During winter the northward shift allows the fronts to extend further north with stronger north-westerly winds and more frequent and heavier rain. The winter winds tend to be strongest in June and are generally northwesterly. The transition periods are around April and September.

The El Niño–Southern Oscillation (ENSO) affects the winds and rainfall over this region. During El Niño the south-easterly winds, while during La Niña the same winds are stronger. These effects on the winds are part of large scale influences on the tropical Atlantic and the South Atlantic High-pressure system, and changes to the pattern of westerly winds further south. There are other influences not known to be related to ENSO of similar importance. Some ENSO events do not lead to the expected changes.

Local variations in wind direction and strength are caused by interaction with the mountains on both sides of False Bay. South-easterly winds are accelerated northwest of Cape Hangklip, and a distinct wind shadow can develop in the lee of the Kogelberg mountain. Northwesterly winds accelerate over Table Mountain and approach False Bay from varying directions depending on the local topography. Temperature differences between land and water can also produce diurnal variations of wind speed and direction, particularly in summer.

Eastward-moving atmospheric Rossby waves move across the area at 3 to 20 day intervals, mostly in winter from May to September, and the subtropical ridge is replaced by coastal lows followed by northwesterly winds and frontal troughs that bring rain, stormy winds and seas.

==== Waves ====
The prevailing swell around Cape Town is long period (12 to 15 secons) swells from the southwest with an average height of about 3 m. These swells are generated far offshore to the southwest of the continent, and the anchorages at both Table Bay and Simon's Town are well protected from them.

Storm waves are generated by northwest gales in winter and southeast gales in summer. Table Bay is very exposed to wind and waves from the northwest, but well protected from waves from the southeast, while Simon's Bay and the other western False Bay anchorages are exposed to southeast wind and waves, except where harbour breakwater structures have been built.

== History ==
The history of the shipwrecks of Cape Town is part of the history of the shipping route around Africa, the history of the colonisation of South Africa and the history of the people of the region once they reached the stage of operating shipping in these waters.

The wrecks include those of explorers, traders, fishing vessels, passenger vessels and warships, sunk by misadventure, acts of war, military exercises, to create artificial reefs, and to dispose of redundant equipment.

=== Significance of the region ===
The European-Asian sea route, commonly known as the sea route to India or the Cape Route, is a shipping route from the European coast of the Atlantic Ocean to Asia's coast of the Indian Ocean passing by the Cape of Good Hope and Cape Agulhas at the southern edge of Africa. The first recorded completion of the route was made in 1498 by Portuguese explorer Vasco da Gama, the admiral of the first Portuguese Armadas bound eastwards to make the discovery. The route was most important during the Age of Sail, but became partly obsolete after the Suez Canal opened in 1869.

Cape Town is a major port city historically serving a large part of the hinterland of South Africa. It has two major harbours, the Port of Cape Town in Table Bay, and the Simon's Town Naval Base, in False Bay. It has intermittently heavy international sea traffic, and anchorages which are protected in some weather conditions and exposed in others. It is variously known as the Cape of Storms, and the Cape of Good Hope. It exhibits the characteristic features of a "shipwreck graveyard", in that it has had high shipping traffic over a long period, has several major navigational hazards, frequent bad weather conditions, was poorly charted for quite a long time, and has a major port with exposed anchorages, often containing a fairly large number of ships. An additional reason for some of the wrecks is scuttling to dispose of obsolescent equipment. As a major fishing harbour during the 20th century, there were frequently old fishing vessels to be disposed of, and in the days before electronic navigational aids, collisions in the anchorage and harbour approaches during bad weather and fog were more frequent. The initial establishment of a settlement at the Cape which became Cape Town was a consequence of its position on the trade route, and was influenced by some of the wreckings, and the availability of fresh water.

=== Establishment of Cape Town ===
In 1647, the Dutch East Indiaman Nieuwe Haerlem was wrecked near the northeastern shore of Table Bay. The crew, with one exception, got off safely, and some were taken aboard by another Dutch ship and two English ships, while the rest stayed to attempt to salvage the cargo. These men also built a fortified shelter and explored the vicinity. They and the cargo they were able to salvage were taken back to the Netherlands by the returning Verenigde Oostindische Compagnie (VOC) fleet of the following year. A report by two of the men to the directors of the VOC persuaded them of the potential benefits of a refreshment station at Table Bay, and in 1652, Jan van Riebeeck was sent to the Cape to establish such a refreshment station.

==== Great gales and the harbour ====
False Bay was proclaimed the winter anchorage after a severe storm on 21 May 1737 wrecked eight out of the ten VOC ships in Table Bay in a single night. The Iepenrode, Flora, Paddenburg, Duinbeek, Goudriaan, Rodenrijs, Buis, and Westerbeek were driven onto a lee shore when their moorings parted at anchor, in what has been described as the greatest maritime disaster in the history of the VOC. 208 men died and cargo to the value of 1,921,532 guildes was lost, nearly 30% of the total cargo value for that year. At the request of Governor-General van Imhoff, in 1742 the company prohibited anchoring in Table Bay between 15 May and 15 August.

Construction of the harbour in Table Bay was started in 1860. The design included a breakwater to protect the entrance. This harbour was completed in 1870 and included the Robinson dry dock, the Alfred Basin, a slipway for repairs and a breakwater constructed largely from the rubble excavated from the harbour basin.

During the construction of the harbour, in the great gale of 17 May 1865, 18 ships were driven aground in Table Bay, of which seven were wrecked: The Fernande, Alacrity, Deane, Royal Arthur, Kehrweider, RMS Athens, and City of Peterborough. The others were beached but refloated later, including: Galatea, Jane, Star of the West, Clipper, Frederick Bassel, Isabel, Figilante, and Maria Johanna

The harbour and breakwater have been extended on several occasions, with the Victoria Basin (1920), Duncan Dock (1945), tanker basin and layup dock(1962) and Ben Schoeman Dock with container terminal (1977).

=== Cultural heritage ===
There are approximately 2800 shipwrecks recorded on the National Shipwreck Database of which the approximate positions of about 840 are known, and the exact, verified position of over 300 vessels. The National Heritage Resources Act (No.25 of 1999) automatically protects any wreck older than 60 years since the date of loss, and can be used to protect more recent wrecks if they are deemed to be worthy of conservation. South Africa became a signatory to the UNESCO 2001 Convention on the Protection of Underwater Cultural Heritage.

Table Bay alone is recorded as the site of about 400 wrecks, of which 70 are now buried under the reclaimed land of the city foreshore.

==== Archaeology of shipwrecks ====
The archaeology of shipwrecks is the field of study specialising in shipwrecks. Its techniques often combine those of archaeology with those of diving to become Underwater archaeology, but shipwrecks can also be found on what have become terrestrial sites.

It is necessary to take into account the distortions in the archaeological material caused by events and processes that occur during and after the wrecking. Prior to being wrecked, the ship would have operated as an organised system, and its crew, equipment, passengers and cargo need to be considered as such. The material remains should provide clues to the functions of seaworthiness, navigation and propulsion as well as to ship-board life. These clues can also infer how a ship functioned, in relation to social, political, and economic context.

==== Identification of a shipwreck ====
A number of techniques are used when trying to find a specific wreck, or to identify a wreck that has been found:

- Historical records and archival research – When a ship is lost there are usually records of the loss and when and where it occurred. This information allows the researcher to track down more information on the vessel and its cargo or other inventory Details such as the construction method, materials, ballast, dimensions, rig, propulsion equipment, general arrangement and cargo may all be useful.
- The location of a wreck will reduce the number of possibilities for identity, and conversely, the identity will limit the range of possible localities.
- Superficial observation of the wreckage – Depending on the structural condition and orientation of the wreck it may be possible to measure some of the principle dimensions and general arrangement details by direct observation or measurement. These data can be compared with the information derived from documentary research.
- Sonar and lidar bathymetry, human and AI analysis
- Examination and analysis of artifacts
- Interdisciplinary collaboration
- Quality of evidence vs quantity of circumstantial evidence
- Elimination of the impossible
- Contamination of the site

==== Operation Sea Eagle ====
10 shipwrecks were positively identified in the vicinity of Robben Island in Operation Sea Eagle, reported in 1994: Bernicia, Daeyang Family, Fong Chung No. 11, Goel No.1, Golden Crown, Natal, Rangatira, Sea Eagle, Solhagen, and Tantallon Castle. Five other sites were located but could not be identified. These may have included A.H. Stevens, Bittern, Il Nazareno, Kingston, and Timor.

Although documents were available which provided approximate positions, seven other vessels could not be found: C. de Eizaguirre, Dageraad, Flora, Forfarshire, Gondolier, Hypatia, and Perseverance.

==== Wreckless Marine survey ====
The Cape Town based private company Wreckless Marine had previously contributed high resolution bathymetric survey data to several marine research agencies including the South African Council for Geoscience and the Nippon Foundation-GEBCO Seabed 2030 Project, and during that work had incidentally acquired positional data on several shipwrecks in False Bay, some of which were well known, and others which were at the time, unidentified. They also had access to bathymetric survey data of similar quality from the Council for Geoscience which had been working in parallel on adjacent areas, mostly in Table Bay and the Atlantic Seaboard of the Cape Peninsula.

Wreckless Marine undertook to resurvey those wrecks which were safely accessible with the available equipment at the highest resolution available with their equipment, and with the cooperation of in-house researchers and technical divers, and marine archaeologists from the South African Heritage Resources Agency, to identify the wrecks where possible. Dives were made to confirm the identities of some of the wrecks where relevant, as the positional records were often insufficient or ambiguous. This data was published in the book Wood, Iron, and Steel, in 2024, which features information on 60 of the wrecks of the Western Cape, 59 of which are in the coastal waters of Cape Town, and which had been identified to an acceptable level of confidence. In a few cases sister ships had been scuttled in fairly close proximity and it is not practicable to discriminate between them with the available information. Position data for a further 22 as yet unidentified wrecks is also given.

== Causes of shipwrecks ==
There are many potential causes of shipwrecks, and not all of them necessarily apply in all regions, however a few stand out as particularly relevant in the waters of Cape Town. The single most prevalent cause appears to be being blown onto a lee shore, either directly after parting of anchor cables or dragging of anchors, or when overwhelmed by wind and wave while under way, often while embayed. (Note: Of a sailing vessel: trapped in a bay and unable to make way to weather to escape.) The causes also vary with time: Navigational error was more common when the waters and their navigational hazards were relatively unknown and poorly charted, and an accurate fix of position at night or in fog was difficult to determine

The numbers of shipwrecks can be considered in the context of the number of ships visiting and transiting the region. In the absence of ships there can be no wreckings. More than 60% of all ships arriving in the 18th century up to the end of the 1760s were Dutch, and in some years more than 90%. Most of the rest during this period were English. Throughout this period the number of ships per year was fairly steady at about 50 per year except in the 1720s when it was about 70 per year The arrival of Dutch ships declined after 1770, then rapidly recovered, along with an increase in the numbers of ships of other flags. However, there is no data on the duration of the stay at the Cape for these ships, and it is obvious that the risk of wrecking at anchor is related to the time spent at anchor and the probability of onshore storms during that season, and the risk of multiple wreckings is affected by the number of ships in port at the same time.

Ships that arrived at the Cape required replenisment of food, water and stores for the next stage of the voyage. After the local economy could support it, products were exported, and the Cape provided rest, recuperation and entertainment to crews, and an opportunity for repairs, all of which encouraged ships to stay at anchor longer. Between 1652 and 1793 the average stay was 28 days. A regulation was imposed by the directors on VOC ships in 1652 making it obligatory for them to check in at the Cape, and for this to be documented by the commander at the Cape. Ship's officers were not penalised for the time spent at anchor in the calculations for speedy voyage bonuses, and records show that 93% of VOC vessels travelling in both directions anchored in Table Bay.

These introduction of chain cable for anchoring was delayed by objections that chain was inelastic, unmanageable, too heavy, and noisy, that it could not be cut, and that it would kink. Invention of the shackle in 1808 solved the problem of cutting and connecting chain. Improvements to the design such as stud links introduced in 1813 by Thomas Brunton reduced kinking problems. Chain cables proved to be considerably more resistant to abrasion than hemp, which can be critical on a rough rocky bottom. By 1817 all seagoing ships of the Royal Navy of fifth-rate or higher were partially outfitted with chain cables, and commercial shipping had started to convert to chain, which also has the advantage of needing less space for storage. By 1840 chain cables were in general use, though hemp was still used by some vessels.

== Wreck diving ==
Wreck diving is recreational diving where the wreckage of ships, aircraft and other artificial structures is explored. The term is used mainly by recreational and technical divers. Professional divers, when diving on a shipwreck, generally refer to the specific task, such as salvage work, accident investigation or archaeological survey. Although most wreck dive sites are at shipwrecks, there is an increasing trend to scuttle retired ships to create artificial reef sites. The recreation of wreck diving makes no distinction as to how the vessel ended up on the bottom. Some wreck diving involves penetration of the wreckage, making a direct ascent to the surface impossible for a part of the dive.

A shipwreck may be attractive to divers for any combination of several reasons:

- it serves as an artificial reef, which creates a habitat for many types of marine life
- it often is a large structure with many interesting parts and machinery, which is not normally accessible to casual observers on working, floating vessels
- it often has an interesting history
- it can present skill challenges for scuba divers to manage the risks associated with wreck penetration.
- it is part of the underwater cultural heritage and may be an important archaeological resource
- it provides a first-hand insight into context for the loss, such as causal connections, geographical associations, trade patterns and many other areas, providing a microcosm of our maritime heritage and maritime history
- it may contain artifacts of historical, artistic and/or monetary value, which can be recovered for profit (treasure hunting) or collection purposes (ranging from rare collector's items to souvenirs, memorabilia or other "trophies", such as crew members' or passengers' personal belongings, nautical instruments, brass portholes or silverware, cutlery, intact china or other tableware).

The impact of recreational scuba diving on recreational dive values and the cultural heritage of shipwrecks has been found to comprise four basic types:

- The removal of artifacts and associated disturbance to wreck sites,
- Direct contact with wrecks and the benthic biota living on them by divers and their equipment,
- Exhaled air bubbles trapped inside the wreckage,
- Impact damage by anchors of dive boats, considered by some researchers to be the most damaging form of impact associated with recreational wreck diving.

== Chronological listing of wrecks ==
=== 1600 to 1649 ===
==== Yeanger ====
1611: A Dutch sailing vessel Yeanger of Hoorn was wrecked on the northern shore of Robben Island.

==== Jaeger ====
27 July 1618: French jacht Jaeger (ex Prinsens Jagt), wrecked in Table Bay near Woodstock beach during a northwest gale, at about 33°55.00′S 18°27.50′E.

==== Mauritius Eylant ====
16 February 1644: Dutch ship Mauritius Eylant ran aground on the rocks at Mouille Point. It was refloated and then run ashore at Salt Riner mouth where the cargo could be more easily salvaged. (or Eiland Mauritius.)

==== Nieuwe Haerlem ====
25 March 1647: Dutch East Indiaman Nieuwe Haerlem, of 500 tons, built in Amsterdam, wrecked on Milnerton Beach at about 33°53.60′S 18°28.80′E. It was on a homeward bound journey with two other VOC vessels, the Olifant and the Schiedam. A sudden gale resulted in the Haerlem running aground on Milnerton beach. (Nieuw Haarlem in Turner 1988)

=== 1650 to 1699 ===
A permanent VOC presence started in Table Bay in 1652.

==== Schapenjacht ====
1660: A Dutch vessel, the Schapenjacht was wrecked on Robben Island. The vessel was completely dismantled and no trace remains.

==== La Maréchale ====
19 May 1660: French ship La Maréchale, wrecked in Table Bay near the Salt River mouth in a northwest gale at about 33°54.90′S 18°27.95′E. Now under reclaimed land.

==== Schollevaar ====
31 May 1668: Dutch hoeker Schollevaar of 90 tons, wrecked just north of Bokpunt (may be outside the range of Cape Town).

==== Sarpine ====
1691: Portuguese warship Sarpine wrecked near Hottentot's Holland during a southeast gale.

==== Goede Hoop ====
5 June 1692: Dutch pinnace Goede Hoop of 1177 tons, built in 1688 in Amsterdam, wrecked in Table Bay near the Salt River mouth at about 33°54.90′S 18°27.95′E during a northwest gale. Now under reclaimed land.

==== Orange ====
5 June 1692: English East Indiaman Orange, wrecked in Table Bay near the Salt River mouth in a northwest gale at about 33°54.90′S 18°27.95′E. Now under reclaimed land.

==== Hogergeest ====
10 June 1692: Dutch jacht Hogergeest of 222 tons, built at Amsterdam in 1681, wrecked in Table Bay near the Salt River mouth near 33°54.90′S 18°27.95′E during a northwest gale. Now under reclaimed land.

==== Dageraad ====
20 January 1694: The Dutch jacht Dageraad of 140 tons, built in Zeeland in 1692, which was carrying the treasures of the Goude Buys was wrecked on Robben Island.

==== Oosterland ====
24 May 1697: Dutch vessel Oosterland of 1123 tons, built in Zeeland in 1685, wrecked in Table Bay in a northwest gale, at about 33°54.90′S 18°27.95′E, now under reclaimed land.

==== Waddinxveen ====
24 May 1697: Dutch ship Waddinxveen of 751 tons, built at Rotterdam in 1691, wrecked in Table Bay near the Salt River mouth at about 33°54.90′S 18°27.95′E in a northwest gale. Now under reclaimed land.(Waddingsveen in LaGrange et al 2024)

==== Het Huis te Craijestein ====
27 May 1698: Dutch pinnace Het Huis te Craijestein wrecked on the Cape Peninsula. Het Huis te Craijestein (or 't Huis 't Kraaijestein) was a 1154-ton Dutch pinas (square rigged galleon) built in 1697 at Middelburg, Zeeland for the Zeeland chamber of the VOC. Length 48.77 m, beam 11.89 m, d 5.64 m.

The ship was wrecked in 1698 on its maiden voyage at Oudekraal on the Cape Peninsula. The anchor cable parted due to abrasion while anchored in fog in Table Bay, and the ship drifted onto the rocks at 33°58.850′S 18°21.650′E.

The wreck is very broken up, but some timber, cannons and anchors are scattered on the sand among the granite boulders at Sandy Cove, where there is a safe and easy shore entry point for divers. The depth on the sand is about 8 m, and some wreckage may be buried under the sand or exposed, as the sand shifts.

=== 1700 to 1749 ===
==== Addison ====
16 June 1722: English East-Indiaman Addison of 400 tons, ran aground at Salt River mouth at 33°54.9′S 18°27.95′E in a northwest gale.

==== Amy ====
16 June 1722: Cape brigantine Amy ran aground at the Castle during a northwest gale at 33°55.45′S 18°25.7′E.

==== Chandois ====
16 June 1722: English East Indiaman Chandois of 440 tons, wrecked in Table Bay during a northwest gale at 33°55.45′S 18°25.70′E. Now under reclaimed land.

==== Gouda ====
16 June 1722: Dutch hoeker Gouda of 220 tons, built in Amsterdam in 1719, wrecked in Table Bay during a northwest gale.

==== Lakenman ====
16 June 1722: Dutch fluyt Lakenman of 600 tons, built at Enkhuizen in 1718, wrecked in Table Bay during a northwest gale.

==== Nightingale ====
16 June 1722: English East Indiaman Nightingale of 480 tons, wrecked in Table Bay near the Salt River mouth during a northwest gale, near 33°55.42′S 18°27.20′E. Now under reclaimed land.

==== Rotterdam ====
16 June 1722: Dutch East Indiaman Rotterdam of 800 tons, built in Rotterdam in 1716, wrecked in Table Bay during a northwest gale at Woodstock Beach. Some cargo and guns were recovered by John Lethbridge.

==== Schotse Lorrendraaier ====
16 June 1722: Dutch frigate Schotse Lorrendraaier, wrecked in Table Bay during a northwest gale.

==== Standvastigheid ====
16 June 1722: Dutch ship Standvastigheid of 888 tons, built at Amsterdam in 1706, wrecked in Table Bay during a northwest gale. Some of the cargo was salvaged shortly after the wrecking.

==== Zoetigheid ====
16 June 1722: Dutch flute Zoetigheid of 600 tons, built in Delft in 1718 for the VOC, wrecked in Table Bay in a northwest gale. Part of the cargo was recovered by early salvage diver John Lethbridge in 1727.

==== Middenrak ====
3 July 1728: Dutch vessel Middenrak of 600 tons, built at Amsterdan in 1717, Wrecked in Table Bay in a northwest gale near the Salt River mouth.

==== Stabroek ====
3 July 1728: Dutch ship Stabroek of 900 tons, built in Ansterdan in 1722, wrecked in Table Bay near the Salt River Mouth during a northwest gate at about 33°55.42′S 18°27.20′E. Some of the cargo was salvaged by divers working for John Lethbridge. Now under reclaimed land.

==== Haarlem ====
4 December 1728: Dutch ship Haarlem of 850 tons, built at Amsterdam in 1720, wrecked in Table Bay near the Salt River mouth near 33°54.90′S 18°27.95′E. Now under reclaimed land.

==== Fijenoord ====
1 July 1736: Dutch brigantine Fijenoord of 160 tons, wrecked in Table Bay near the Salt River mout near 33°54.90′S 18°27.95′E, and now under reclaimed land,

==== Flora ====
21 May 1737: Dutch ship Flora of 850 tons, built at Amsterdam in 1730, wrecked in Table Bay near the Salt River mouth at about 33°54.90′S 18°27.95′E in a northwest gale, and is now under reclaimed land.

==== De Buis ====
21 May 1737: Dutch ship De Buis of 600 tons, built in 1727 at Enkhuizen, wrecked in Table Bay at the mouth of the Salt River at 33°54.90′S 18°27.95′E during a northwest gale. Now under reclaimed land.

==== Duinbeek ====
21 May 1737: Dutch East Indiaman Duinbeek of 800 tons, built in Zeeland in 1727, wrecked in Table Bay near the Salt River mouth at 33°55.28′S 18°27.28′E during a northwest gale. Now under reclaimed land. (Duinbeek in la Grange et al 2024 Duinbreek in Turner)

==== Goudriaan ====
21 May 1737: Dutch fluyt Goudriaan of 630 tons, built at Delft in 1719, wrecked in Table Bay near the Salt River mouth at about 33°54.90′S 18°27.95′E, during a northwest gale, and now under reclaimed land.

==== Iepenrode ====
21 May 1737: Dutch East Indiaman Iepenrode of 650 tons, built at Amsterdam in 1731, wrecked at the Salt River mouth in Table Bay during a northwest gale at about 33°54.90′S 18°27.95′E, now under reclaimed land.

==== Paddenburg ====
21 May 1737: Dutch East Indiaman Paddenburg of 850 tons, built at Amsterdam in 1732, wrecked in Table Bay near the Salt River mouth at about 33°54.90′S 18°27.95′E. Now under reclaimed land.

==== Rodenrijs ====
21 May 1737: Dutch vessel Rodenrijs of 650 tons, built at Rotterdam in 1735, wrecked in Table Bay near the Salt River mouth at about 33°54.90′S 18°27.95′E during a northwest gale. Now lies under reclaimed land.

==== Victoria ====
21 May 1737: Dutch brigantine Victoria of 160 tons, built at Hoorn in 1724, wrecked in Table Bay in a northwest gale at Woodstock Beach at about 33°55.00′S 18°27.20′E, now under reclaimed and.

==== Westerwijk ====
21 May 1737: Dutch vessel Westerwijk of 850 tons, built at Amsterdam in 1735, wrecked in Table Bay near the Salt River mouth during a northwest gale at about 33°54.90′S 18°27.96′E. Now under reclaimed land.

==== Vis ====
6 May 1740: Dutch ship Vis of 650 tons, built at Enkhuizen in 1732, wrecked in Table Bay at night a short distance south of Green Point lighthouse at about 33°54.20′S 18°23.85′E.

==== Reigersdaal ====
25 October 1747: Ship Reigersdaal wrecked at Silwerstroomstrand. Dutch East Indiaman Reigersdaal was built for the Amsterdam chamber of the Dutch East India Company (VOC) in 1738 in Amsterdam.

It was wrecked in shallow water on 25 October 1747 at Silwerstroomsrand at 33°35.800′S 18°21.200′E. Very little remains of the wreck besides heavily encrusted anchors and cannon. The site is unsuited to survey using multibeam sonar as it is in the surf zone. Diving is restricted to conditions when the swell is low.

=== 1750 to 1799 ===
==== La Cybelle ====
19 March 1756: French slave ship La Cybelle of twelve guns wrecked a little north of Bloubergstrand on a voyage from Guinea to Mauritius with a cargo of slaves. (or La Cybele)

==== Schuilenberg ====
3 June 1756: Cape vessel Schuilenberg of 300 tons built at Amsterdam in 1747, wrecked near Camps Bay.

==== Voorzichtigheid ====
18 June 1757: Dutch provision ship Voorzichtigheid of 850 tons, built at Delft, in 1743, wrecked in Table Bay at the Salt River mouth at about 33°54.90′S 18°27.95′E in a northwest gale, now under reclaimed land.

==== Jonge Thomas ====
1 June 1773: Dutch ship Jonge Thomas of 1150 tons, built at Amsterdam in 1764, wrecked in Table Bay during a northwest gale near the Salt River mouth at about 33°54.90′S 18°27.95′E. Now under reclaimed land. The wreck was the scene of a rescue of 14 people by the local burgher Wolraad Woltemade, who died in the attempt.

==== Nieuwe Rhoon ====
31 January 1776: Dutch East Indiaman Nieuwe Rhoon of 1150 tons, built at Zeeland in 1764, was badly damaged when it struck Whale Rock during a south-easterly gale. It was towed to the Castle Jetty and beached to salvage the cargo, and the wreck abandoned. During the construction of the Cape Town Civic Centre building in 1970, wreckage of a wooden ship was found in the foundation excavation at about 33°55.16′S 18°25.85′E and identified as probably the Nieuwe Rhoon.

==== La Ceres ====
15 October 1776: French ship La Ceres, wrecked in Table Bay during a northwest gale, near the Salt River mouth at about 33°54.90′S 18°27.95′E. Now under reclaimed land.

==== Colebrooke ====
25 August 1778: Ship Colebrooke wrecked in False Bay. The Colebrook was a three-decked British ship of 739 tons and 26 guns built in 1770 at Blackwall, London for the East India trade. It has a length of 41.76 m and beam of 10.82 m. The ship was named after George Henry Colebrooke, a director of the East India Company at the time. It was lost on its third voyage to the East.

It was intentionally grounded on 25 August 1778 off Kogel Bay beach after sustaining severe damage from an impact with what is now called Anvil Rock at the mouth of False Bay while leading the East India fleet to the winter anchorage at Simon's Town, The ship's master decided that the vessel would not survive beating north to Simon's Town and to reach across the bay and hope to find a sandy beach to run aground. Anvil Rock was not shown on the charts used by the 1778 East India fleet.

The wreck was rediscovered in 1984 and identified by items of cargo such as copper plates, lead ingots, barrels of gunpowder and broken wine bottles. The remains of the wreck lie on the east side of False Bay at 34°13.871′S 18°50.588′E, in about 5 m of water, usually covered by sand.

==== Le Victor ====
24 September 1782: French corvette Le Victor of 16 guns, wrecked in Table Bay near the Salt River mouth during a northwest gale at about 33°54.90′S 18°27.95′E, and now lies under reclaimed land.

==== Sévere ====
27 January 1784: French 64 gun ship Sévere wrecked at Bloubergstrand in Table Bay on a voyage from Mauritius to France with a regiment of soldiers. Everyone survived.

==== Hoop ====
30 June 1784: Dutch fluyt Hoop of 800 tons, wrecked in Table Bay at Mouille Point.

==== HMNS Holland ====
11 March 1786: Dutch ship HMNS Holland of 68 guns, wrecked at night near Olifantsbospunt on the Cape Peninsula.

==== La Rozette ====
19 August 1786: French brig La Rozette wrecked at Platboom south if Olifantsbospunt on the Cape Peninsula after a mutiny.

==== Katwijk aan den Rijn ====
7 October 1786: Dutch hoeker Katwijk aan den Rijn of 750 tons, built in Amsterdam in 1774, driven ashore in a gale in Simon's Bay without loss of life. (or Dutch East India schooner Catwyk aan Rhyn)

==== Avenhorn ====
17 May 1788: Dutch East Indiaman Avenhorn of 880 tons, wrecked during a northwest gale in Table Bay.

==== La Pénélope ====
16 October 1788: French frigate Pénélope, (40-gun one-off design by Jacques-Noel Sané, with 28 × 18-pounder and 12 × 8-pounder guns) launched 30 October 1788 at Brest – wrecked at Muizenberg beach.

==== Drietal Handelaars ====
16 May 1789: Dutch ship Drietal Handelaars of 502 tons, wrecked on the rocks at Swartklip in False Bay after dragging anchors in a southeast gale.

==== Erfprins van Augustenburg ====
12 April 1790: Danish East-Indiaman Erfprins van Augustenburg, wrecked in Table Bay.

==== HMS Guardian ====
12 April 1790: Fifth rate two-decker Roebuck-class ship HMS Guardian of 44 guns, laid down in 1780, was driven ashore in Table Bay by a gale and wrecked.

On 24 December 1789, Guardian was severely damaged by an iceberg, and the ship was sailed 400 leagues (1,900 km) to the Cape of Good Hope.

==== Maria ====
12 April 1790: Italian barque Maria, wrecked in Table Bay.

==== Drie Gebroeders ====
2 June 1792: Dutch fluyt Drie Gebroeders of 828 tons, beached in Simon's Bay after springing a leak.

==== Sterreschans ====
22 May 1793: Dutch hoeker Sterreschans of 850 tons, bought by the Amsterdam yard in 1789, wrecked in Table Bay near the Castle at about 33°55.45′S 18°25.70′E in a northwest gale. Now under reclaimed land.

==== Zeeland ====
22 May 1793: Dutch East Indiaman Zeeland of 1150 tons, wrecked in Table Bay during a northwest gale.

==== São José Paqueta ď África ====
1794: Ship São José Paquete ď Africa wrecked on the Cape Peninsula. The São José Paquete ď Africa (or São José-Paquete de Africa) was a Portuguese slave ship that sank in 1794 off the coast of Cape Town, South Africa. It struck a reef quite close to shore, and sank in 8 m of water. 212 of the 400 to 500 African slaves who were aboard died when the ship sank. In 2015, the Smithsonian's African American History Museum, South Africa's Iziko Museums, the Slave Wrecks Project, and other partners, confirmed discovery of the wreck near where it sank. The ship and its slaves were headed from Portuguese Mozambique to Colonial Brazil, during the height of the international African slave trade. Few other former slave ships have been found, but the São José is the first and only shipwreck discovered, as of June 3, 2015, of a working slave ship, which sank in transit with its human cargo aboard.

The vessel ran aground and sank about 150 m off Second Beach, Clifton. The wreckage is fragmented and scattered on low reef with dense kelp at 33°56.227′S 18°22.543′E. Wreckage comprises small fragments of timber, some cannons and shot, iron shackles and a few other small items of debris. The site is unsuitable for multibeam sonar mapping due to the kelp cover. (Turner 1988 has: 27 December 1794, Portuguese slaving ship São Josene wrecked at Camps Bay.)

==== Gothenburg ====
8 March 1796: Swedish East Indiaman Gothenburg wrecked at Green Point.

==== Columbia ====
4 June 1796: American vessel Columbia, wrecked in Table Bay.

==== Jefferson ====
9 May 1798: American ship Jefferson, Wrecked in Table Bay

==== HMS Sceptre ====
5 November 1799: Ship HMS Sceptre, a 64-gun third-rate ship of the line of the Royal Navy, launched on 8 June 1781 at Rotherhithe, wrecked in a storm when the anchor cable parted, and the ship was blown onto a reef at Woodstock Beach in Table Bay. at 33°55′12″S 18°27′0″E, currently the location of the Royal Cape Yacht Club.

==== Anubis ====
5 November 1799: American ship Anubis wrecked in table bay during a northwest gale.

==== Hannah ====
5 November 1799: American brig Hannah wrecked in Table Bay near the Castle during a northwest galeat, 33°S 18°E, and is now under reclaimed land.

==== Oldenburg ====
5 November 1799: Dutch ship Oldenburg of 64 guns, wrecked in Table Bay in a northwest gale.

==== Sierra Leone ====
5 November 1799: British whaler Sierra Leone, ran aground in Table Bay, now under reclaimed land.

=== 1800 to 1849 ===
==== Benjamin ====
20 September 1800: British sloop Benjamin lost with all hands at Gordon's Bay.

==== Brunswick ====
25 September 1805: Ship Brunswick of 1200 tons, wrecked at Simon's Town. Brunswick was launched in 1792 as an East Indiaman for the British East India Company (EIC). Length 39.62 m, beam 12.8 m, 1244 tons with 30 guns. It made five complete voyages for the EIC before the French captured it in 1805. Shortly thereafter the ship was wrecked at the Cape of Good Hope.

The ship was driven aground in a storm on 25 September 1805 after losing three anchors off Long Beach, Simon's Town at 34°10.872′S 18°25.607′E The remaining wreckage, (Note: Surveyed in high resolution by multibeam sonar 2023–2024 by Wreckless Marine.) about 33 m long and 18 m wide, is partly buried in sand at a depth of about 5 m, and is easily accessible from the beach.

==== L'Atalante ====
3 November 1805, French frigate L'Atalante, wrecked during a northwest gale in Table Bay at the Charlotte battery at about 33°55.42′S 18°27.00′E, now under reclaimed land.

==== Hunter ====
3 November 1805: American ship Hunter of 188 tons and four guns, wrecked in Table Bay in a northwest gale.

==== Le Napoléon ====
25 December 1805: French privateer Le Napoléon driven ashore at Olifantsbos on the Cape Peninsula after a chase by the frigate HMS Narcissus

==== HNMS Bato ====
8 January 1806: Ship Bato burned and ran aground in Simon's Town. Bato was built as the 800 ton 74-gun ship of the line Staaten Generaal in 1788 in Rotterdam. Later renamed Bato, and used to transfer the new governor Jan Willem Janssens and his retinue to the Cape when it was returned to the Netherlands after the treaty of Amiens. The ship set off to Batavia in 1803 and returned in 1804, and was later that year declared unseaworthy and moved to False Bay to serve as a floating battery at Simon's Town anchorage.

It was burned at anchor on 8 January 1806 to prevent it falling into enemy hands off Long Beach, Simon's Town, at 34°11.001′S 18°25.560′E. The remaining wreckage lies on the sand at a depth of 3 to 4 m. It is very broken up and the debris field is about 45 m long and 9 m wide. It is easily accessible from the beach.

==== Atalante ====
10 January 1806: The French frigate Atalante was reported to have been destroyed by running aground at Simon's Town. On 3 November 1805 while moored near the Cape of Good Hope, a gust of wind washed her ashore. Troude reports that by 7 November she had been refloated and repaired. Accounts of her subsequent fate differ. One account has it that she was found irreparable and was written off as a total loss. However, Commodore Sir Home Popham reported that the "French Ship Atalante, of 40 Guns, and Batavian Ship Bato, of 68 Guns: Destroyed by the Enemy running them on Shore when the Cape was attacked, January 10, 1806."

==== Fame ====
15 September 1806: The privateer Fame (twelve guns) was standing in for Table Bay, working around Green Point off Cape of Good Hope, when a squall coming from the south carried away rigging including the topmasts. This caused the vessel to bear away and run aground on Robben Island, and the "ship went to pieces." No lives were reported lost, and a large portion of the cargo was saved.

==== Pénélope ====
16 April 1809: French prize vessel Pénélope, Wrecked in Table Bay near Milnerton. (Wooden sailing schooner chased into Table Bay by HMS Olympia where it ran aground on Milnerton Beach?)

==== Feniscowles ====
21 October 1810: British ship Feniscowles of 359 tons, built at Shields in 1818, wrecked at Green Point.

==== Discovery ====
29 July 1816: Wooden-hulled sailing vessel Discovery, wrecked on Woodstock beach in Table Bay near Fort Knokke.

==== Young Phoenix ====
29 July 1816: Vessel Young Phoenix, wrecked in Table Bay.

==== Camille ====
18 October 1816: Brig Camille wrecked at Muizenberg beach.

==== Woodbridge ====
5 November 1816: British wooden ship Woodbridge of 522 tons, wrecked in Table Bay.

==== L'Alouette ====
6 June 1817: French ship L'Alouette, hit Albatross Rock in a heavy fog, and sank near 34°16.20′S 18°22.80′E.

==== Winifred & Maria ====
Late August 1817: Coasting brig Winifred & Maria, wrecked in Table Bay next to the wharf at about 33°55.45′S 18°25.70′E, now under reclaimed land.

==== Malta ====
March 1818: British snow Malta, of 166 tons, built in 1802, wrecked in Table Bay at Paarden Eiland.

==== Tarleton ====
17 April 1818: British ship Tarleton of 298 tons, built at Liverpool in 1790, wrecked in Table Bay near the Castle at about 33°55.45′S 18°25.70′E. Nuw under reclaimed land.

==== Jane ====
18 May 1818: British snow Jane, of 200 tons, built in Denmark in 1806, wrecked in Table Bay near the Castle at about 33°55.45′S 18°25.70′E, now under reclaimed land.

==== Pacquet Real ====
18 May 1818: Portuguese slaving brig Pacquet Real, wrecked in Table Bay near the wharf at about 33°55.45′S 18°25.70′E. Now under reclaimed land.

==== Anne ====
July 1818: British ship Anne of 310 tons wrecked at Paarden Eiland.

==== Vrouw Ida Alida ====
10 November 1818: Dutch ship Vrouw Ida Alida wrecked at Muizenberg near St. Jams.

==== Nossa Senhora D'Guia ====
2 May 1819: Portuguese brig Nossa Senhora D'Guia, wrecked in Table Bay during a northwest gale.

==== Prins Willem I ====
26 July 1819: Dutch brig Prins Willem I, wrecked in Table Bay after being struck by lightning.

==== Elizabeth ====
7 October 1819: British vessel Elizabeth of 500 tons, wrecked in Table Bay near Paaden Eiland.

==== Dorah ====
4 January 1821: Dorah wrecked in Table Bay at Paarden Eiland in a northwest gale.

==== Emma ====
4 January 1821: British ship Emma of 467 tons, built in India in 1813, wrecked in Table Bay during a northwest gale.

==== L'Éclair ====
5 February 1821: French ship L'Éclair, wrecked on the north-east side of Table Bay at night.

==== Cerberus ====
10 March 1821: British ship Cerberus of 372 tons, built in Sunderland 1n 1816, wrecked in Table Bay at Blouberg at night.

==== Waterloo ====
25 October 1821: British wooden brig Waterloo wrecked in Fish Hoek. The Waterloo was a sailing merchant vessel of 215 tons, launched in Sunderland in 1815. It was driven ashore and wrecked at Fish Hoek in False Bay on 25 October 1821, with no loss of life. The remains of the wreck lie in about seven meters of water.

==== Flora ====
16/17 November 1821: The Dutch wooden sailing schooner Flora was wrecked in the shallows at the southern tip of Robben Island in the early morning. (ship (proper) according to Werz 1994.)

==== John ====
4 December 1821: SchoonerJohn wrecked in Table Bay at Blouberg when she missed stays.

==== Fame ====
14 June 1822: British wooden ship Fame of 629 tons, built at Calcutta in 1817, wrecked slightly south of Graaf's Pool, during a northwest gale, at about 33°54.50′S 18°23.20′E.

==== Sarah ====
9 July 1822: British ship Sarah of 600 tons, built at Bristol in 1810, wrecked in Table Bay near the Salt River mouth at about 33°55.50′S 18°26.40′E. Now under reclaimed land.

==== Adriatic ====
20 July 1822: British snow Adriatic of 193 tons, wrecked in Table Bay during a northwest gale.

==== Good Intent ====
21 July 1822: Coastal schooner Good Intent, wrecked in Table Bay in a northwest gale.

==== Lavinia ====
21 July 1822: British snow Lavinia of 233 tons, built in Sunderland in 1815, wrecked in Table Bat near the Castle in a northwest gale at about 33°55.45′S 18°25.70′E, and is now under reclaimed land.

==== Leander ====
21 July 1822: British brig Leander of 202 tons, built in Whitehaven in 1813, wrecked in Table Bay near the Castle during a northwest gale at about 33°55.45′S 18°25.70′E. Now under reclaimed land.

==== Cockburn ====
4 April 1823: Wooden sailing schooner HM Schooner Cockburn wrecked on Muizenberg beach. Alternative dates from 3 to 6 April have been cited.

==== Apollo ====
16 April 1823: Wooden sailing ship Apollo, wrecked below the Mouille Point Battery in Table Bay.

==== San Antonio ====
4 August 1824: Brig San Antonio of 141 tons, Wrecked near the hospital in Table Bay during a gale near 33°55.50′S 18°26.40′E, now under reclaimed land.

==== Gondolier ====
7 February 1826: British brig Gondolier of 226 tons was wrecked on Robben Island.(1836?)

==== Perseverance ====
12 March 1826: The British ship Perseverance of 353 tons, built in 1825, was wrecked on Whale Rock near Robben Island.

==== Nautilus ====
31 March 1826: British brig Nautilus of 163 tons, built in 1812, wrecked in Table Bay.

==== Walsingham ====
14 June 1828: Wooden sailing barque Walsingham of 185 tons, built in 1795, wrecked on Woodstock Beach in Table Bay. near the hospital, at about 33°55.50′S 18°26.40′E. Now under reclaimed land.

==== Padang ====
29 June 1828: Dutch ship Padang of 430 tons, built in 1821, wrecked in Simon's Bay, or Muizenberg beach on a voyage from Padang, Sumatra, to Antwerp with coffee and spices.

==== Phoenix ====
19 July 1829: Ship Phoenix wrecked at Simon's Town. Phoenix was a wooden merchant sailing vessel of approximately 500 tons launched in 1810 at Topsham, Devon, and was originally chartered by the East India Company. Phoenix was wrecked at Simon's Bay on 19 July 1829. after a voyage from Ceylon carrying passengers, none of whom were lost, and a cargo of sundries, part of which was saved. She wrecked on the seaward side of what is now known as Phoenix Shoal at 34°11.388′S 18°26.898′E.

==== Alfred ====
4 July 1830: Wooden barque Alfred of 267 tons, wrecked in Table Bay in a northwest gale.

==== Singapore ====
1 December 1830: British snow Singapore of 271 tons, built in 1826, wrecked near the Mouille Point lighthouse.

==== Thorne ====
18 May 1831: British ship Thorne of 221 tons, built in 1819, wrecked on Robben Island in thick fog.

==== Calpe ====
16 July 1831: British brig Calpe of 165 tons, wrecked in Table Bay during a northwest gale.

==== Sir James Saumarez ====
16 July 1831: Brig Sir James Saumarez of 100 tons, wrecked during a northwest gale in Table Bay near the military hospital, at about 33°55.50′S 18°26.40′E, now under reclaimed land,

==== Candian ====
17 July 1831: British barque Candian of 226 tons, wrecked in Table Bay during a northwest gale.

==== Flamingo ====
16 August 1833: Schooner Flamingo, caught fire and wrecked in Buffels Bay, Cape Peninsula on the Cape Peninsula.

==== L'Aigle ====
15 February 1834: French whaler L'Aigle ran aground near Slangkop beach on the Cape Peninsula.

==== La Camille ====
18 October 1836: French brig La Camille wrecked at Strandfontein.

==== Antelope ====
18 August 1837: British schooner Antelope of 107 tons, built at Cowes in 1800, wrecked in Table Bay near the jetty at 33°55.50′S 18°26.4′E. Now under reclaimed land.

==== Dunlop ====
24 November 1838: Irish ship Dunlop of 332 tons, built in 1806 wrecked on Woodstock beach at night at 33°55.10′S 18°27.20′E. Now under reclaimed land.

==== Royal William ====
20 September 1837: British ship Royal William of 451 tons, built in 1830 at Whitby, wrecked near Mouille Point.

==== Le Protee ====
10 January 1839: French whaling brig Le Protee (Le Protie?) of 187 tons wrecked at Strandfontein.

==== Juliana ====
19 January 1839: Barque Juliana of 549 tons, wrecked near the Mouille Point battery

==== Trafalgar ====
21 February 1839: British wooden ship Trafalgar of 364 tons, ran ground and wrecked at Rocklands Bay in Sea Point at about 33°54.45′S 18°23.60′E.

==== Admiral Cockburn ====
27 July 1839: Barque Admiral Cockburn of 350 tons, wrecked at Muizenberg beach. The vessel was built in the US in about 1809. The British captured the ship in 1814 and it was sold as a prize. In 1829 it became a whaler in the southern whale fishery, and was wrecked at Muizenberg Beach, False Bay, in July 1839 while returning to London from its third whaling voyage. On 19 October 1839. The Times reported that Admiral Cockburn had gone onshore at Muizenberg Beach on 26 July 1839 while returning to London from a whaling voyage in the South Seas. The crew, except for one man, was saved, as were 1100 barrels of oil. (Note: The whaling voyages' database gives a date of 26 September for the loss, and the report appearing at the Cape of Good Hope gives a date of 18 October. This is inconsistent with the news appearing in London on 19 October.)

==== Paragon ====
1 April 1840: Ship Paragon of 376 tons, wrecked slightly to the west of Green Point during a northwest gale.

==== Howard ====
16 July 1840: British barque Howard of 197 tons, built at Dumbarton in 1833, wrecked in Table Bay in a northwest gale near the Castle at about 33°55.45′S 18°25.79′E, and now under reclaimed land.

==== Palmer ====
19 August 1840: British brig Palmer of 283 tons, built in Sunderland in 1836, wrecked near Mouille Point at night.

==== Bengal ====
17 September 1840: British barque Bengal, wrecked in Tabe Bay near Blouberg Beach after entering the bay at night.

==== Catharine Jamieson ====
19 September 1840: Wooden barque Catharine Jamieson of 272 tons, built at Bremerhaven in 1838, wrecked at Mouille Point at night.

==== Udny Castle ====
26 November 1840: British snow of 287 tons, built in Sunderland in 1839, wrecked at Green Point near the lighthouse

==== Felix Vincidor ====
18 July 1841: Wooden schooner Felix Vincidor of 140 tons, driven ashore at night and wrecked at Muizenberg beach.

==== Prince Rupert ====
4 September 1841: British barque Prince Rupert of 322 tons, built in London in 1827, wrecked at Mouille Point.

==== Saint Antonio ====
29 March 1842: Slaving brig Saint Antonio wrecked in Chapmans Bay.

==== Helen ====
29 May 1842: British wooden barque Helen, wrecked at Mouille Point while attempting to enter Table Bay.

==== Speedy ====
13 July 1842: British schooner Speedy of 115 tons, built yn Nova Scotia in 1834, wrecked in Table Bay near the Imhoff battery when anchor cables parted during a northwest gale, at about 33°55.45′S 18°25.70′E. Now under reclaimed land.

==== Abercrombie Robinson ====
28 August 1842: British wooden 3 masted troop ship Abercrombie Robinson of 1415 tons built in Blackwall in 1825, parted anchor cables in a northwesterly storm and was blown ashore on Salt River beach in Table Bay with no loss of life.

==== Waterloo ====
28 August 1842: British convict transport Waterloo, a wooden ship of 414 tons built at Bristol in 1815, parted anchor cables and ran aground on Salt River beach in Table Bay during a northwest galeat about 33°54.90′S 18°27.95′E. Now under reclaimed land.

==== Fairfield ====
9 September 1842: American barque Fairfield of 198 tons, wrecked in Table Bay when her cables parted during a northwest gale, at 33°55.50′S 18°26.40′E, and now lies under reclaimed land.

==== John Bagshaw ====
9 September 1842: British ship John Bagshaw of 416 tons, built in Liverpool in 1835, wrecked in Table Bay near the south wharf when anchor cables parted in a northwest storm. Now buried under reclaimed land at about 33°55.50′S 18°26.40′E.

==== Reform ====
9 September 1842: British brig Reform of 131 tons, built at Maryport in 1830, wrecked in Table Bay at the Imhoff battery when her cables parted in a northwest gale at about 33°50.50′S 18°26.40′E. Now buried under reclaimed land.

==== Mary Stewart ====
3 November 1842: German ship Mary Stewart of 500 tons, wrecked in Table Bay between the lighthouses at about 33°53.90′S 18°24.50′E.

==== Diana ====
7 January 1846: Portuguese slaving barque Diana of 270 tons, wrecked at Imhoff battery after cables parted in a northwest gale at 33°55.50′S 18°26.40′E. Now under reclaimed land.

==== Francis Spaight ====
7 January 1846: British barque Francis Spaight of 368 tons, built at Sunderland in 1835, and wrecked on Woodstock Beach in Table Bay near 33°54.90′S 18°27.70′E when a cable parted. Now under reclaimed ground.

==== Robert ====
12 February 1847: British ship Robert of 595 tons, built at New Brunswick in 1843, sprung a leak and was beached without loss of life near Gordon's Bay. (Cape of Good Hope Almanac, 1852, p105)

==== Montagu ====
30 March 1847: Schooner Montagu of 20 tons, built on the Kowie River, wrecked near Slangkop on the Cape Peninsula.

==== Israel ====
9 April 1847: American whaler Israel of 357 tons, wrecked in Table Bay near the Salt River mouth at about 33°54.90′S 18°27.95′E when cables parted during a northwest gale. Now under reclaimed land.

==== Saldanha Bay Packet ====
21 November 1847: Schooner Saldanha Bay Packet, sank near the Imhoff Battery during a northwest gale at about 33°55.50′S 18°26.40′E, now under reclaimed land.

==== Bittern ====
18 January 1848: British wooden snow or brig Bittern of 348 tons, built at North Shields in 1842, wrecked at the northwest of Robben Island in a southeast gale.

==== Chieftain ====
6 June 1848: Brig Chieftain of 147 tons, built in Dumbarton in 1841, wrecked near the Mouille Point lighthouse.

==== Le Cygne ====
8 August 1849: French ship Le Cygne of 318 tons, wrecked in Table Bay at Paarden Eiland.

==== Enchantress ====
24 August 1849: British wooden schooner Enchantress of 142 tons built at Ipswich in 1834, wrecked in Table Bay between Mouille Point and Green Point.

=== 1850 to 1899 ===
==== Rowvonia ====
13 January 1850: Brazilian slaving barque Rowvonia of 300 tons, wrecked in Simon's Bay, after cables parted in a southeast gale.

==== Arab ====
1 June 1850: Barque Arab of 378 tons, driven ashore in a northwest gale after her cables parted. 33°55.5′S 18°26.40′E

==== London ====
18 June 1850: Sailing vessel London wrecked in Table Bay in a north-westely gale after its cables parted.

==== Royal Albert ====
25 June 1850: British wooden barque Royal Albert of 407 tons, built at Sunderland in 1840, wrecked when the anchor cable parted during a northwest gale in Table Bay near the hospital at about 33°55.50′S 18°26.40′E. Now under reclaimed land.

==== Nimrod ====
24 July 1851: British wooden ship Nimrod of 469 tons, built at Ipswitch in 1812, wrecked in Table Bay at night when anchor cables parted in a northwest gale.

==== Fanny ====
29 July 1851: Brig Fanny of 215 tons, wrecked in Table Bay during a northwest gale at about 33°55.50′S 18°26.40′E, and now lies under reclaimed land.

==== Royal Saxon ====
1 October 1851: British wooden barque Royal Saxon of 322 tons, built at Leith in 1847, wrecked at Paarden Eiland while entering Table Bay at night

==== Chartley Castle ====
8 October 1851: British wooden barque Chartley Castle of 382 tons, built at Teignmouth in 1842, wrecked in Table Bay at Milnerton at night.

==== Herschel ====
24 January 1852: British wooden snow Herschel of 221 tons, built at Dysart, Fife in 1839, wrecked in Table Bay near Rietvlei.

==== Courier ====
18 May 1852: Schooner Courier of 136 tons, wrecked in Table Bay near the Imhoff battery when cables parted in a northwest gale. Now under reclaimed land at 33°55.50′S 18°26.40′E.

==== Swea ====
10 November 1852: Swedish barque Swea of 344 tons, wrecked near the Mouille Point lighthouse at night.

==== Kingston ====
23 December 1852: American barque Kingston of 214 tons, wrecked at the south of Robben Island.

==== Sophia ====
7 March 1853: British wooden brigantine Sophia of 165 tons, built in Nova Scotia in 1848, wrecked near Witsands south of Hout Bay on the Cape Peninsula.

==== Dido ====
10 April 1853: British barque Dido of 248 tons, built at Toulon in 1847, wrecked in Table Bay at Mouille Point.

==== Kent ====
30 July 1856: British full-rigged wooden ship Kent of 815 tons, built at Sunderland in 1846, wrecked in Table Bay at Paarden Eiland.

==== Sandwich ====
10 August 1853: British wooden brig Sandwich of 150 tons, built at Falmouth, Cornwall in 1810, wrecked in Table Bay near Rietvlei.

==== Sea Eagle ====
16 November 1856: American barque Sea Eagleof 625 tons, wrecked on the east side of Robben Island in Murray Bay in a southeast gale. (Note: Position surveyed by Operation Sea Eagle using buoys and standard trigonometrical surveying methods)

==== Zalt Brommel ====
3 December 1856: Dutch Barque Zalt Brommel of 642 tons, wrecked in Table Bay between Mouille Point and the Chavonnes battery 33°54.85′S 18°25.60′E. Now under reclaimed land.

==== Timor ====
22 December 1856: Dutch barque Timorof 441 tons, wrecked at the south of Robben Island after missing stays.

==== Defence ====
5 March 1857: British vessel Defence of 608 tons, built in 1844, wrecked after entering Table Bay at nigh between Rietvlei and the Salt River mouth.

==== Newport ====
5 June 1857: Brigantne Newport of 116 tons, wrecked in Table Bay near 33°55.50′S 18°26.40′E, and is now under reclaimed land.

==== Gitana ====
7 June 1857: Schooner Gitana of 90 tons, wrecked in Table Bay near the Imhoff battery at 33°55.59′S 18°26.40′E after cables parted in a northwest gale. Now under reclaimed land.

==== Isabella ====
7 June 1857: Brigantine Isabella of 104 tons, wrecked in Table Bay near the Imhoff battery when cables parted in a northwest gale, at about 33°55.50′S 18°26.40′E, now under reclaimed land.

==== Christabel ====
10 June 1857: British wooden barque Christabel of 335 tons, wrecked in Table Bay at 33°55.45′S 18°26.00′E when the cable parted. Now under reclaimed land.

==== William James ====
10 June 1857: British wooden barque William James of 293 tons, built at Sunderland in 1855, wrecked in Table Bay at the Imhoff battery at about 33°55.50′S 18°26.40′E. Now under reclaimed land.

==== Arabia ====
10 May 1858: American barque Arabia of 382 tons, wrecked at Green Point.

==== Arago ====
30 November 1858: German barque Arago of 630 tons, wrecked in Table Bay at Rietvlei during a gale.

==== Malabar ====
4 November 1858: Sardinian ship Malabar of 650 tons, wrecked in Table Bay at Rietvlei.

==== Rastede ====
5 March 1858: Barque Rastede of 462 tons, wrecked in Table Bay at Rietvlei after entering the bay during a gale.

==== Oste ====
20 March 1859: German brigantine Oste of 120 tons, wrecked in Table Bay at Whitesands near Blouberg, at night during a strong wind.

==== Anne ====
3 June 1859: Schooner Anne of 96 tons, wrecked near Olifantsbospunt on the Cape Peninsula.

==== Unity ====
5 September 1859: British wooden brig Unity of 190 tons, built at Whitehaven in 1848, wrecked on Bellows Rock.

==== Sarah Charlotte ====
3 June 1860: British wooden brig Sarah Charlotte of 207 tons, built at Mistley in 1840, wrecked in Table Bay near the hospital in a northwest gale after anchor cables parted at about 33°S 18°E. Now under reclaimed land.

==== Sir Henry Pottinger ====
4 July 1860: British barque Sir Henry Pottinger of 586 tons, built in 1844, wrecked in Table Bay near the Salt River mouth after the anchor cable parted in a northwest gale, at about 33°54.90′S 18°27.95′E, now under reclaimed land.

==== Mariner ====
3 August 1860: British barque Mariner of 487 tons, wrecked at Green Point.

==== Bernicia ====
16 June 1861: British wooden barque Bernicia of 548 tons, built in Sunderland in 1848, wrecked on the west of Robben Island.

==== Frigga ====
19 January 1862: Danish barque Frigga, ran aground near Milnerton in Table Bay in a southeast gale.

==== A.H. Stevens ====
7 February 1862: American clipper ship A.H. Stevens of 999 tons, stranded in Shell Bay on Robben Island.

==== Valleyfield ====
15 June 1862: British wooden barque Valleyfield of 400 tons, built in Quebec in 1851, wrecked at Green Point in fog.

==== Johanna Wagner ====
15 July 1862: Ship Johanna Wagner wrecked in False Bay. The Prussian sailing barque Johanna Wagner, of 600 tons, was bound from Batavia to Amsterdam with a cargo of tobacco, sugar, coffee, India rubber, gall-nuts, gum damar, and tin when she was wrecked at "Zandfontein" (Strandfontein) near Muizenberg, on 15 July 1862 due to pilot error. There were no deaths. Blame for the wreck was placed on the pilot refusing to use the services of a harbor pilot.

==== Crystal Palace ====
8 August 1862: British wooden barque Crystal Palace of 480 tons, built at Teighnmouth in 1852, wrecked in Table Bay on Sceptre reef in a northwest gale at 33°55.30′S 18°26.50′E.

==== Kate ====
8 August 1862: British wooden barque Kate of 904 tons, built at Quebec in 1848, and wrecked in Table Bay in a northwest gale, slightly east of the Salt River mouth at about 33°54.90′S 18°27.95′E.

==== Marietta ====
8 August 1862: Brigantine Marietta of 133 tons, wrecked in Table Bay during a strong northwest gale after anchor cables parted, near to 33°55.30′S 18°27.50′E, now under reclaimed land.

==== Lucy Johnson ====
20 September 1862: American barque Lucy Johnson of 263 tons, wrecked in Table Bay in a northwest gale when anchor cables parted at about 33°55.50′S 18°26.40′E. Now under reclaimed land.

==== Susan ====
20 September 1862: British schooner Susan of 80 tons, wrecked in Table Bay near the hospital when anchor cables parted and the vessel ran ashore at about 33°55.50′S 18°26.40′E. Now under reclaimed land.

==== Parana ====
9 October 1862: American barque Parana Wrecked opposite the blockhouse in Simon's Bay after the anchor cables parted.

==== Akbar ====
12 January 1863: British wooden ship Akbar of 809 tons, built in Sunderland in 1852, wrecked in Table Bay at Rietvlei.

==== Rover ====
22 February 1863: South African brig Rover, wrecked in Table Bay at Whitesands near Blouberg, while leaving the bay in thick fog.

==== SS Albatross ====
10 April 1863: Steam screw tug Albatross of 74 tons struck Albatross Rock near Olifantsbospunt on the west coast of the Cape Peninsula and sank nearby. The position is not known.

==== Eliza ====
6 August 1863: German brig Eliza of 264 tons, wrecked in Table Bay at Mouille Point in a northwest wind.

==== Sappho ====
15 March 1864: British wooden barque Sappho of 374 tons, built at Greenock in 1840, wrecked in Table Bay at Blouberg Beach at night during a gale.

==== Grahamstown ====
26 May 1864: British wooden barque Grahamstown of 327 tons, built in Sunderland in 1862, burned out and went aground in Table Bay near 33°55.50′S 18°26.40′E, Now under reclaimed land.

==== Forfarshire ====
15 September 1864: British ship Forfarshire wrecked at Whale Rock near Robben Island.

==== Rubens ====
10 May 1865: British wooden ship Rubens of 403 tons, built at Aberdeen in 1853, wrecked after entering Table Bay at night near Rietvlei during a gale .

==== Alacrity ====
17 May 1865: British wooden barque Alacrity of 317 tons, built at Sunderland in 1856, wrecked in Table Bay at 33°55.5′S 18°26.75′E in a northwest gale. Now under reclaimed land

==== RMS Athens ====
17 May 1865: Ship Athens wrecked in Table Bay. RMS Athens was an iron single-screw steam barque of 737 tons built in Liverpool in 1856, with a top speed of 11knots. Length 68.2 m, beam 9.14 m. It was wrecked during the "Great Gale of 1865" on the rocks north of Green Point lighthouse in Table Bay, at 33°53.864′S 18°24.531′E. The wreckage is broken up and scattered on the shoreline reef in water mostly shallower than 7 m. The most substantial item of wreckage is the engine cylinder, which extends above the water at low tide, which makes it very easy to find.

==== City of Peterborough ====
17 May 1865: British wooden barque City of Peterborough of 331 tons, wrecked on Sceptre Reef in Table Bay near 33°55.30′S 18°26.5′E during a northwest gale.

==== Deane ====
17 May 1865: British wooden barque Deane of 200 tons, built in 1851 in London, wrecked in Table Bay in a northwest gale.

==== Fernande ====
17 May 1865: Danish schooner Fernande of 86 tons, wrecked in Table Bay during a northwest gale near 33°55.50′S 18°26.40′E. Now buried under reclaimed land.

==== Kehrweider ====
17 May 1865: German schooner Kehrweider of 180 tons, wrecked in Taple Bay during a northwest gale.

==== Royal Arthur ====
17 May 1865: British wooden barque Royal Arthur of 301 tons, built at King's Lynn in 1855, wrecked in Table Bay during a northwest gale near 33°55.50′S 18°26.40′E. Now under reclaimed land.

==== Piscataqua ====
19 July 1865: American ship Piscataqua of 890 tons, wrecked between Mouille Point and Green Point at about 33°53.85′S 18°24.53′E.

==== Hopefield Packet ====
2 January 1869: Coastal schooner Hopefield Packet, wrecked at Camps Bay.

==== Benefactress ====
19 November 1870: American barque Benefactress of 540 tons wrecked at Lourens River mouth, The Strand, in False Bay, after striking a rock off Agulhas.

==== Shepherd ====
9 August 1874: British wooden barque Shepherd of 424 tons, built at Sunderland in 1862, wrecked on the new breakwater in Table Bay at about 33°54.80′S 18°25.60′E, now under reclaimed land.

==== Mulgrave Castle ====
4 September 1875: British ship Mulgrave Castle of 405 tons, built in 1813, wrecked in Table Bay at Green Point.

==== Knysna Belle ====
19 June 1876: Cape wooden schooner Knysna Belle of 66 tons, built in 1863, wrecked in Table Bay at Rietvlei.

==== RMS Kafir ====
13 February 1878: British iron steam coaster RMS Kafir of 982 tons, built in 1873, struck Albatross Rock on the Cape Peninsula at about 34°17.80′S 18°24.00′E and sank.

==== Caledonian ====
18 June 1878: Wooden barque Caledonian wrecked on Woodstock beach in Table Bay in a north-westerly gale when its cables parted.

==== Jeanne ====
19 July 1878: French schooner Jeanne of 181 tonnes, wrecked in Table Bay at the Salt River mouth at about 33°50.90′S 18°27.95′E, during a northwest gale, now under reclaimed land.

==== Redbreast ====
20 July 1878: British wooden barque Redbreast of 312 tons, built at Grimsby in 1863, wrecked in Table Bay in a northwest gale at Fort Knokke, at about in 33°55.50′S 18°26.75′E. Now under reclaimed land.

==== Etta Loring ====
22 July 1878: American barque Etta Loring of 716 tons, wrecked when her lines parted during a northwest gale at 33°55.00′S 18°21.20′E, now under reclaimed land.

==== Paralos ====
18 January 1880: French barque Paralos of 362 tons, Sank 2 hours after striking Bellows Rock.

==== Star of Africa ====
30 August 1880: Ship Star of Africa wrecked on the Cape Peninsula. The Star of Africa was an iron sailing barque built in Scotland in 1876, trading between Cape Town and Calcutta. Length 47.09 m, beam 8.32 m. It sank on 30 August 1880, 2 km west of Olifantsbospunt on the southern Cape Peninsula after hitting the uncharted reef at Albatross Rock. The vessel sank while trying to reach the shore at 34°16.295′S 18°21.550′E. The wreckage is very broken up and lies on sand and low sandstone reef at a depth of about 27 m.

==== Lancastria ====
31 December 1880: British wooden barque of 321 tons, built in 1856, wrecked on Robben Island after the anchor cable parted during a southeast gale.

==== Reno ====
8 December 1883: Italian barque Reno of 648 tons, built by Fava, at Voltri in 1875, wrecked at Mouille Point.

==== Olga R. ====
30 October 1885: Austrian wooden barque Olga R. of 674 tons, built in Buccari in 1874, wrecked at Mouille Point at 33°53.85′S 18°24.65′E.

==== Il Nazareno ====
2 December 1885: Italian barque Il Nazareno of 938 tons, wrecked on the west side of Robben Island.

==== Caterina Doge ====
3 June 1886: Italian barque Caterina Doge of 586 tons, built at Voltri in 1875, wrecked at Matroosdam, Cape Point.

==== Carlotta B ====
7 August 1886: Italian wooden barque Carlotta B of 759 tons, built at Sestri Ponente in 1874, wrecked at Olifantsbospunt

==== Onni ====
7 February 1890: Russian wooden barque Onni of 826 tons, built in 1871, wrecked in Table Bay at Blouberg in fine weather at night.

==== Lucania ====
29 May 1893: British three-masted wooden brig Lucania, beached in False Bay after a fire broke out.

==== Atlas ====
9 October 1896: Norwegian wooden ship Atlas of 1,296 tons, built in 1875 in Bath, Maine, wrecked in Tabe Bay on Blouberg Beach

==== Nukteris ====
9 August 1897: Schooner Nukteris wrecked at Buffels Bay in False Bay just north of Cape Point.

==== SS Thermopylae ====
12 September 1899: Steel screw barquentine SS Thermopylae of 3711 tons, built at Aberdeen in 1891, wrecked in Table Bay at night in front of the Green Point lighthouse at about 33°53.95′S 18°23.95′E.

==== Tiger ====
30 November 1899: Steam tug Tiger wrecked in Table Bay Harbour.

=== 1900 to 1949 ===
==== Kakapo ====
25 May 1900: Ship Kakapo wrecked on the Cape Peninsula. Kakapo was a 665-ton schooner-rigged steamship built in 1898 by the Grangemouth Dockyard Company, and registered in the United Kingdom. The ship ran aground on 25 May 1900 on Noordhoek beach on the Cape Peninsula, while on passage to Sydney, Australia in a northwesterly gale with heavy rain that impaired visibility. The watch mistook Chapman's Peak for Cape Point and the ship ran aground on the sandy beach from which it was not possible to refloat it, at 34°07′26″S 18°20′56″E. The wreck is inshore of the current high water mark and largely buried in dune sand.

==== America ====
29 May 1900: British iron barque America of 1280 tons, caught fire at anchor and sank at 33°54.95′S 18°27.0′E.

==== RMS Tantallon Castle ====
7 May 1901: British mail steamer Tantallon Castle wrecked on the west side of Robben Island in dense fog near 33°47.50′S 18°21.65′E.

==== Hermes ====
13 May 1901: Ship Hermes wrecked in Table Bay. Hermes was a British-registered merchant steamer of 3400 tons built at Sunderland in 1899. Length 106.74 m, beam 14.33 m, powered by a triple-expansion steam engine with a maximum speed of 12.5 knots. The ship was driven aground on 13 May 1901 when the anchor dragged during a northwesterly storm off Milnerton Beach in Table Bay The wreck lies parallel to the shore at 33°52.210′S 18°29.255′E in shallow water and is very broken up and partly covered by sand. It is easily accessible from the beach or by boat but is in the surf zone in a moderate swell.

==== Ryvingen ====
30 May 1902: Norwegian iron barque Ryvingen, (ex Tenasserim), of 1504 tons, built at Belfast in 1866, wrecked in Table Bay on Woodstock Beach near the mole at about 33°55.00′S 18°27.20′E, when anchor cables parted in a northwest gale.

==== Armenia ====
9 June 1902: Italian barque Armenia ran ashore during a storm after colliding with another vessel and anchoring off Blouberg at the start of a voyage.

==== SS City of Lincoln ====
14 August 1902: British iron screw steamer SS City of Lincoln of 3182 tons, wrecked at the Salt River mouth in Table Bay at 33°54.90′S 18°27.95′E.

==== The Highfields ====
14 August 1902: Ship The Highfields wrecked in Table Bay. The Highfields was a steel four masted barque of 2280 tons, launcheds in 1882 in Stockton-on-Tees. Length 88.79 m, beam 12.8 m. The vessel sank after a collision with the anchor cable of a moored steamer, while approaching the harbour at night in heavy weather, and lies just outside the current harbour entrance to the Port of Cape Town, at 33°53.152′S 18°25.830′E. The wreck lies upside down on low reef at about 20 m depth. It is easily accessible by boat but very close to the shipping lane.

==== Clan Monroe ====
2 June 1905: Ship Clan Monroe wrecked on the Cape Peninsula. The Clan Monroe was a steel turret deck steamer of 4853 tons, built by Doxford in Sunderland in 1897. Length 121.95 m, beam 15.3 m. The ship was powered by a triple-expansion engine with two coal-fired Scotch boilers, with a maximum speed of 12 knots.

The ship ran aground on 2 June 1905 on reef due to navigational error about 380 m north-northwest of the Slangkop lighthouse at Kommetjie on the Cape Peninsula. The wreck lies at 34°08.817′S 18°18.949′E on a rocky bottom at a depth of about 5 to 8 m. It is very broken up and the site is exposed to breaking surf in a large swell.

==== Oakburn ====
18 April 1906: Ship Oakburn wrecked on the Cape Peninsula The Oakburn was an iron steam freighter of 3766 tons, built in Glasgow in 1904. Length 109.58 m, beam 14.96 m, powered by a triple-expansion steam engine with three Scotch boilers and a single screw propeller, giving a top speed of 9 knots.

It ran aground in poor visibility in the early morning of 18 April 1906 on the north side of Duiker Point on the Cape Peninsula due to navigational error ascribed to drift and possible chronometer error, at 34°02.219′S 18°18.478′E The wreck is quite broken up, and partly obscured by the later wreck of the BOS 400. Although very close to the shore it is only accessible by boat.

==== Maori ====
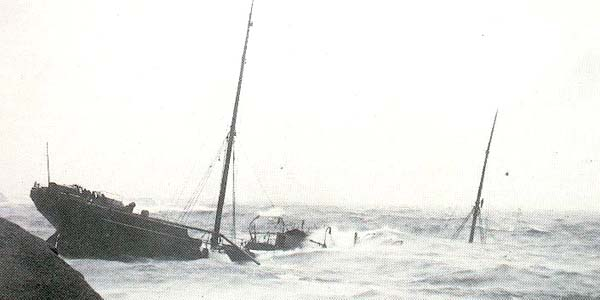
Wrecking of the Maori

5 August 1909: Ship Maori wrecked on the Cape Peninsula. Maori was a British refrigerated cargo steamship built in 1893 by C.S. Swan & Hunter of Wallsend-on-Tyne for Shaw, Savill & Albion Co. of London with intention of transporting frozen meat and produce from Australia and New Zealand to the United Kingdom. The vessel stayed on this trade route through most of its career. In August 1909 while on one of its regular trips, it was wrecked on the coast of South Africa with the loss of thirty two of the crew.

The ship was of the improved three-deck type, specially designed for colonial frozen meat trade and had poop deck, long bridge house and long topgallant forecastle. The machinery was amidships and the hold subdivided by six water-tight bulkheads and the holds and 'tween decks were insulated. The vessel was equipped with six refrigerating engines to cool down the insulated compartments which were designed to carry approximately 70,000 carcasses of mutton. She was equipped for quick loading and unloading of cargo, including eight steam winches.

The ship was 402.6 feet (122.7 m) long (between perpendiculars) and 48.3 feet (14.7 m) abeam with a moulded depth of 29.6 feet (9.0 m). Maori was originally assessed at 5,200 GRT and 4,038 NRT and had deadweight of approximately 7,000. The vessel had a steel hull with cellular double bottom throughout and a single 461 nhp triple-expansion steam engine, with cylinders of 29-inch (74 cm), 46-inch (120 cm) and 77-inch (200 cm) diameter with a 48-inch (120 cm) stroke, that drove a single screw propeller, a maximum speed of 11.0 knots (12.7 mph; 20.4 km/h).

In the early morning of 5 August 1909 Maoriran aground a few kilometres south of the suburb of Llandudno on the west coast of Cape Peninsula in fog and heavy seas. The crew launched three lifeboats, but the master and 14 of her crew were left on board. Thirty-two people died, including her master and most of his navigating officers.

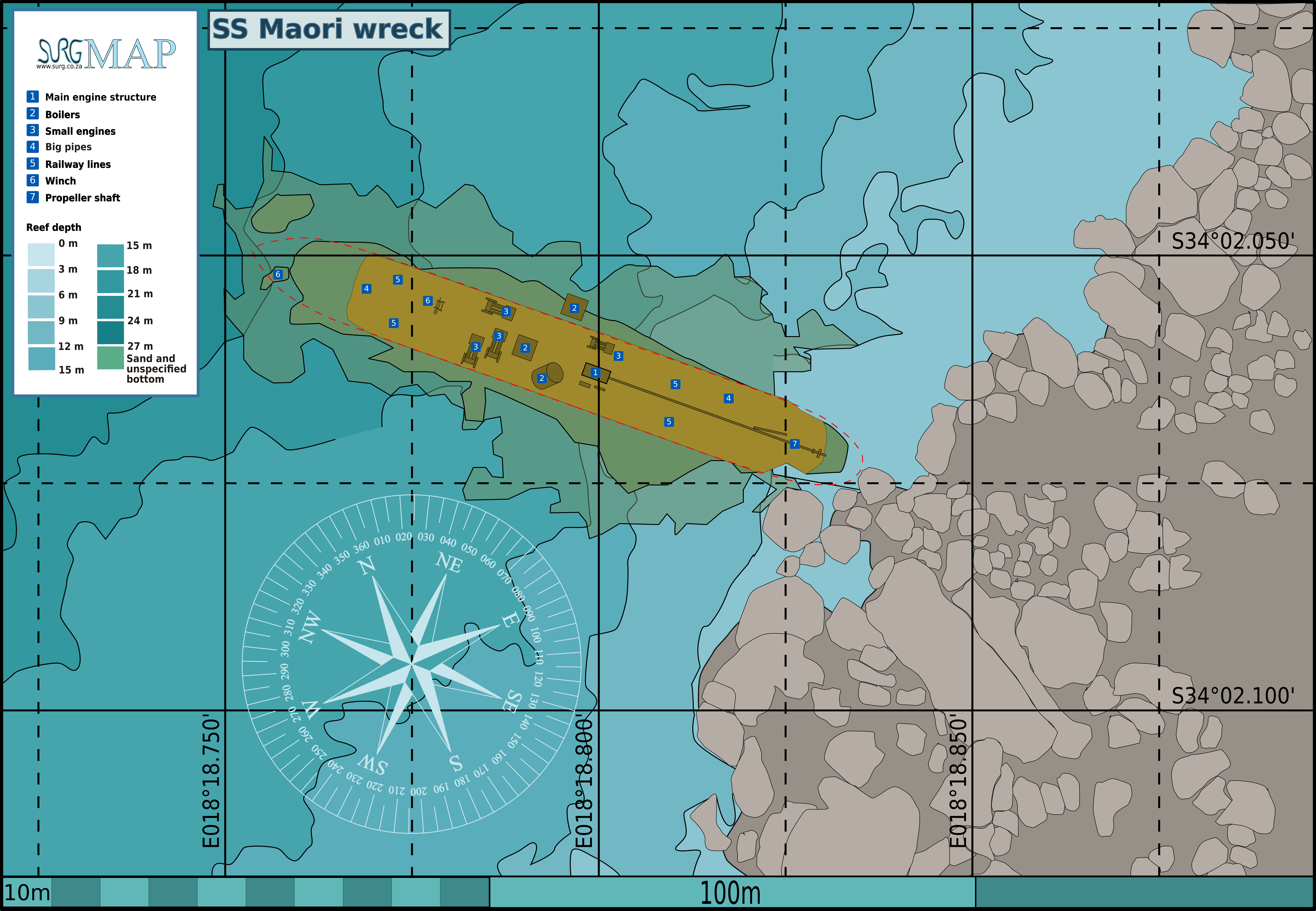
Map of the wreck site

The wreck lies in water up to 24 metres (79 ft) deep between granite boulders at 34°02.060′S 18°18.790′E. Since the 1960s it has been popular with scuba divers, but it can be visited only when the weather is calm and the prevailing southwesterly swell is low. The hull has been vandalized and much of the general cargo that the ship carried has been removed by hunters of salvage and souvenirs over the years. In the 1970s divers dynamited the hull to search for non-ferrous metal. The cargo included crockery, rolls of linoleum, champagne and red wine. In the right conditions it is a popular scuba wreck diving site.

==== Umhlali ====
15 September 1909: Ship Umhlali wrecked on the Cape Peninsula. Umhlali was a steam-powered steel merchant vessel of 3388 tons built in 1904 in Sunderland. Length 106.1 m, beam 13.2 m. Powered by a single-screw triple-expansion engine giving a top speed of 13 knots. The ship ran aground on the reef at Albatross Rock on the night of 15 September 1909 due to navigational error on a course set dangerously close to the rock. The wreck lies about 700 m west-southwest of Olifantsbospunt on the Cape Peninsula at 34°16.435′S 18°22.487′E on a low-profile rocky reef about 8 m deep. It is very broken up and in an exposed location with dense kelp.

==== Lusitania ====
18 April 1911: Ship Lusitania wrecked off Cape Point. SS Lusitania was a Portuguese twin-screw ocean liner of 5,557 tons, built in 1906 by Sir Raylton Dixon & Co, and owned by Empresa Nacional de Navegação, of Lisbon. Length 128.2 m, beam 15.61 m, with twin screws driven by two triple-expansion steam engines and four Scotch boilers, with a top speed of 14 knots.

The ship was wrecked on Bellows Rock off Cape Point, at 24h00 on 18 April 1911 in fog while en route from Lourenço Marques (now Maputo), Mozambique, with 25 first-class, 57 second-class and 121 third-class passengers, and 475 African labourers. Out of the 774 people on board, eight died when a life boat capsized. On 20 April the ship slipped off the rock into 37 metres (121 ft) of water to the east of the rock. The wreck has become a fairly well known recreational dive site, but at 33 to 40 metres, it is deeper than recommended for the average recreational diver, and the currents and breakers over the reef make it a moderately challenging dive.

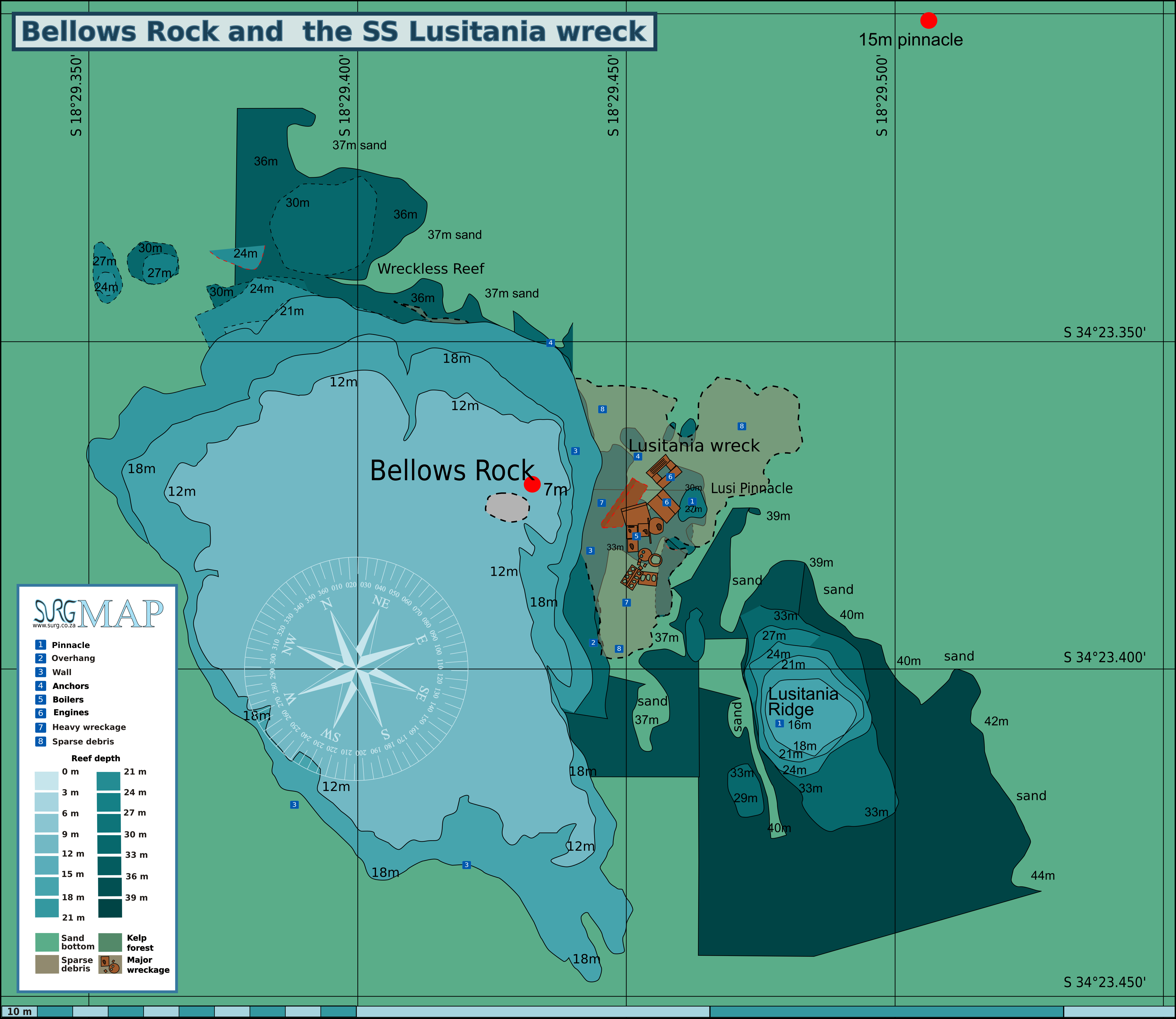
Map of the wreck site of SS Lusitania

The sinking of Lusitania spurred the local authorities to construct a new lighthouse on the Cape Point. The wreckage lies on the east side of Bellows Rock, south of Cape Point, at 34°23.378′S 18°29.451′E. although quite broken up, there is still quite a lot of wreckage, including the boilers and one of the engines, which leans against a tall boulder. The bow is to the north, with hawse-pipes and anchors.

==== Natal ====
24 May 1914: Norwegian steam whaler Natal wrecked at the north of Robben Island

==== SS Clan Stuart ====
21 November 1914 : Ship Clan Stuart stranded in False Bay. Clan Stuart was a steel turret deck ship of 3594 tons, built by Doxford in Sunderland, and launched in 1900. It was powered by a single triple-expansion steam engine driving a screw propeller. Length 108.2 m, beam 13.9 m.

On 21 November 1914 the ship dragged anchor and ran aground on the reef at Glencairn. It was pulled off the rocks but nor allowed into Simon's Town for drydocking due to risk of sinking, so it was run up the beach at Mackerel Bay, where it was moored and stabilised with two anchors and a cable to shore. After an underwater inspection of the damage, repairs were attempted, but were unsuccessful and the engine room flooded during an attempt to refloat the ship.

The wreck lies about 130 m off the beach in Simon's Bay, at 34°10.303′S 18°25.842′E on a mostly sandy bottom at a depth of about 7 m. The structure is broken up, and the main debris field is about 112 m by 36 m. The boilers, engine and shaft are still more or less in place with the cylinders awash and a blade missing from the cast-iron propeller. Access is easy from the beach or by boar.

==== Magnet ====
31 January 1916: Robben Island packet Magnet was wrecked at Hout Bay Harbour while passing through the entrance in a gale and a large swell, and was carried onto the shore by the tide.

==== SS Rangatira ====
31 March 1916: British twin screw steam liner Rangatira of 7465 tons, built in Belfast in 1910, wrecked at the northwest of Robben Island in dense fog near 33°50.25′S 18°21.50′E.

==== C. de Eizaguirre ====
26 May 1917: Spanish mail steamer C. de Eizaguirre wrecked at Robben Island.

==== SS Bia ====
17 September 1917: Ship Bia wrecked on the Cape Peninsula. Bia was a steel Swedish freighter of 3226 tons, built in Newcastle in 1905. It was powered by a single triple-expansion steam engine. Length 103.63 m, beam 14.94 m. The ship was wrecked due to navigational error on 17 September 1917 when it struck Albatross Rock. The wreck lies northwest of Olifantsbospunt on the Cape Peninsula, at 34°16.217′S 18°22.638′E, and is broken into two sections. The bow is further inshore, and the larger offshore section contains the boiler and engine. The structure is very broken up and is in the surf zone at times. Depth is around 5 m, and the reef is covered by heavy kelp. Diving is possible from a boat in a low swell.

==== Golden Crown ====
18 July 1923: Iron British steam trawler (or coaster) Golden Crown ran aground and wrecked in heavy fog at the northwest of Robben Island.

==== Hypatia ====
29 October 1929: Ship Hypatia wrecked at Robben Island. Hypatia was a British steam freighter built in Newcastle in 1902. Length 137.7 m, beam 15.91 m, 5663-ton, powered by a single triple-expansion engine with a top speed of 14 kt. It was wrecked on a voyage from Beira to New York when it struck Whale Rock in heavy swell and fog. The wreckage lies on flattish reef about 9 m deep, 200 m west of Whale Rock in Table Bay, at 33°50.105′S 18°22.750′E. The wreck is very broken up, but the boilers, engine and propeller shaft are easily recognised.

==== Winton ====
28 July 1934: Ship Winton, built at Glasgow in 1928, wrecked in Table Bay off Milnerton beach at 33°52.151′S 18°29.183′E due to navigational error.. Winton was a diesel-powered single-screw merchant vessel constructed in 1928 in Glasgow. Length 114.36 m, beam 16.31 m, depth 7.83 m, 4388 tons. It ran aground 290 m off Milnerton beach. The wreck is broken up and what remains is partly covered by sand. Depth on the sand is about 3 m.

==== Solhagen ====
11 September 1936: British steam whaler Solhagen wrecked at Robben Island.

==== Thomas T. Tucker ====
27 November 1942: Ship Thomas T. Tucker Wrecked on the Cape Peninsula. The SS Thomas T. Tucker (Hull Number 269) was a Liberty ship built by The Houston Shipbuilding Corporation for service as a troop and weapons carrier. The ship was powered by two oil-fired boilers and a single triple-expansion steam engine with a top speed of 11.5 knots. Length 134.57 m, beam 17.37 m, 7176 gross registered tons. Launched on 31 August 1942.

The ship ran aground on its maiden voyage in thick fog just after midnight on 27 November 1942 on the south side of Olifantsbospunt on the Cape Peninsula, at 34°16.603′S 18°23.228′E. The wreck is located on the rocks of the shoreline south of Olifantsbos Point within the Cape of Good Hope Nature Reserve. It is broken into three major sections with a boiler higher up on the beach. The shallow rocky shoreline reef is unsuitable for multibeam sonar mapping.

==== SS George M. Livanos ====
1 April 1947: Greek steamer SS George M. Livanos of 5482 tons, built in West Hartlepool in 1938, wrecked and burned off the Green Point lighthouse at about 33°53.95′S 18°23.90′E

==== General Botha ====
13 May 1947: Ship General Botha scuttled in False Bay. SATS General Botha was built as HMS Thames, a Mersey-class protected cruiser for the Royal Navy launched on 3 December 1885. The ship was placed in reserve on completion in 1888 and was converted into a submarine depot ship in 1903. It was sold out of the navy in 1920 and was purchased by a South African businessman to serve as a training ship for naval cadets under the name SATS General Botha. The ship arrived in South Africa in 1921 and began training her first class of cadets in Simon's Town the following year. The unit continued to train cadets for the first years of World War II, but the RN took over the ship in 1942 for use as an accommodation ship under its original name.

The ship had a length between perpendiculars of 300 feet (91.4 m), a beam of 46 feet (14.0 m) and a draught of 20 feet 2 inches (6.1 m). It displaced 4,050 long tons (4,110 t) and was powered by a pair of two-cylinder horizontal, direct-acting, compound-expansion steam engines, each driving one shaft, which were designed to produce a total of 6,000 indicated horsepower (4,500 kW) and a maximum speed of 18 knots (33 km/h; 21 mph) using steam provided by a dozen coal-fired Scotch boilers with forced draught.

The ship was scuttled by shore battery gunfire on 13 May 1947 in central False Bay at 55 m on a sandy bottom at 34°13.673′S 18°38.289′E. The wreck lies approximately upright, but the structure has partly collapsed, particularly the stern. Visibility is unpredictable, but seldom good.

==== King Emperor ====
22 July 1948: Ship King Emperor foundered in Table Bay. King Emperor was a 246-ton steel steam trawler built in Dundee in 1914. It was powered by a single-screw triple-expansion engine. Length 36.68 m, beam 6.86 m. The ship foundered on 22 July 1948 in Table Bay, 3.5 km northwest of Green Point lighthouse, after taking on water during heavy seas. It lies at 33°53.267′S 18°21.949′E in about 43 m of water on a rocky bottom. The wreck lies upright on the bottom, and is relatively intact. The wheelhouse and foredeck are quite waster, but the winch, boiler, engine, shaft and propeller are still in place.

=== 1950 to 1999 ===
==== Delver ====
1957: Dredger Delver scuttled in Table Bay. Delver was a self-propelled bucket dredger built in Scotland in 1912 for the government of the Union of South Africa to maintain and improve the Victoria Basin of Cape Town's harbour facilities. Length, 39.01 m, beam 7.65 m, 217 tons, with a speed of 7 knots and capacity to dredge to a depth of 12 m. It was sunk 8 km southwest of Robben Island lighthouse in a training exercise for the SAAF in 1957. The wreck lies on a sandy bottom at 73 m at 33°51.184′S 18°18.034′E, and is relatively intact.

==== Cape Matapan ====
20 April 1960: Ship Cape Matapan sunk after collision in Table Bay. The steam side trawler Cape Matapan of 321 tons was built in Selby, England, in 1925. It was propelled by a single screw powered by a triple-expansion engine with a Scotch boiler, giving a top speed of 11 knots. It sank about 1.8 km north-northeast of Green Point lighthouse at 33°53.235′S 18°24.534′E after another trawler, the Bulby collided with it while it was anchored in fog. The wreck lies on low flat reef and is broken up and scattered over a wide area. The boiler and trawl winch are the main features of the site.

==== Nerine ====
7 July 1961: Ship Nerine scuttled in Table Bay. The steel side trawler Nerine was built in Aberdeen in 1925. Length 35.10 m, beam 6.73 m, 197 tons. Powered by a single triple-expansion steam engine with a coal-fired Scotch boiler. The vessel was stripped of useful parts and scuttled 6.5 km southwest of Robben Island lighthouse at 33°50.725′S 18°18.866′E on 7 July 1961. The wreck lies on a sandy bottom at 66 m. The hull is mostly intact, but the superstructure is gone.

==== Mooivlei ====
25 February 1964: Ship Mooivlei scuttled in Table Bay. Mooivlei was a steel side trawler built in Yorkshire in 1935. Length 39.38 m, beam 7.28 m, 252 tons, powered by a triple-expansion steam engine. It was scuttled on 25 February 1964, 7.7 km northwest of Green Point lighthouse in Table Bay at 33°52.386′S 18°19.495′E. The wreck lies upright on sand at 62 m depth. The hull is substantially intact, but the wheelhouse has collapsed. There is considerable damage to the stern, and the propeller blades are broken. It has not been possible to positively distinguish between this wreck and that of the sister ship Blomvlei which is less than 2 km away.

==== Bluff ====
31 January 1965: The steam-powered I&J fishing trawler Bluff, ran aground and wrecked in heavy fog at Camps Bay just south of Bakoven, Bluff served as a minesweeper for the South African Navy during World War II.

==== Nolloth ====
30 April 1965: 345-ton Dutch coaster Nolloth struck Albatross Rock and beached nearby in Olifantsbos Bay near 34°16′S 18°23′E. The cargo was mostly salvaged on site. Some of the wreckage washed ashore and is embedded in the beach sand. Length 41 m, beam 7.3 m, draught 2.96 m. Powered by a single 4-cylinder marine diesel engine of 240Hp, with a top speed of 9.5 knots.

==== SAS Fleur ====
8 October 1965: Ship Fleur scuttled in False Bay. SAS Fleur was a 750-ton Bar class boom defence vessel built as HMS Barbrake at Renfrew, Scotland in 1942, Length 55.47 m, beam 9.76 m, powered by two triple-expansion steam engines driving two propellers. At the end of its useful life it was sunk in central False Bay, 11.8 km East-northeast from Simon's Town by naval gunfire and aircraft of the SAAF, at 34°10.834′S 18°33.895′E. The wreck rests upright on the sand bottom at about 41 m. The bow gantry has collapsed forward onto the sand, and the plating has wasted considerably over most of the topsides, deck and superstructure.

==== Blomvlei ====
11 February 1966: Trawler Blomvlei scuttled in Table Bay. Blomvlei was a steel side trawler built in Yorkshire in 1935. Length 39.37 m, beam 7.24 m, 252 tons, powered by a triple-expansion steam engine. The ship was scuttled in Table Bay, 5.9 km northwest from Green Point lighthouse at 33°52.484′S 18°20.729′E. The wreck lies on a sand bottom at 53 m depth, listed slightly to port, and is substantially intact. It has not been possible to positively distinguish between this wreck and that of the sister ship Mooivlei, which is less than 2 km away.

==== S.A. Seafarer ====
1 July 1966: Ship S.A. Seafarer wrecked in Table Bay. The S.A. Seafarer was built as the Clan Shaw at Greenock Dockyart in 1949. It was an 8101 gross ton single-screw steam freighter powered by three turbines geared to a single shaft for a service speed of 16.5 kt. Length 149.02 m, beam 20.21 m, depth 12.4 m

The ship was wrecked on the rocky shoreline reefs about 400 m northwest of the Green Point lighthouse in Table Bay on 1 July 1966, at 33°53.939′S 18°23.822′E. The ship was approaching Table Bay in a northwesterly wind of 30 knots and heavy seas, and ran aground just after midnight. The wreck is broken up and spread along about 150 m of the shoreline reef in about 6 m of water. It is usually dived from a boat.

==== SAS Bloemfontein ====
5 June 1967: Minesweeper Bloemfontein scuttled in False Bay. HMSAS Bloemfontein was an Algerine-class minesweeper built for the Royal Navy in Canada during World War II. The ship was originally HMS Rosamund (pennant number: J439) and spent some time clearing minefields in European waters after she was completed in 1945 before she was placed in reserve. Rosamund was purchased by South Africa in 1947 and renamed HMSAS Bloemfontein in 1948.

After the S.A. Navy decided that the ship was no longer needed it was stripped of useful equipment before being sunk as a target in False Bay by the frigate President Kruger and the minesweeper SAS Johannesburg on 5 June 1967. The wreck lies upright on a sand bottom in central False Bay at 55 m depth at 34°14.669′S 18°39.972′E It is fairly intact, and is occasionally dived, though the boat ride is quite long and visibility is unpredictable.

==== Disa ====
27 September 1967: Trawler Disa sunk in Table Bay. Disa was a 453-ton coal-fired single-screw steam side trawler built in Beverley, Yorkshire, in 1959, which sank after a collision with another trawler on 27 September 1967, about 8.4 km northwest of Green Point lighthouse at 33°52.398′S 18°18.981′E. The wreck lies on its starboard side on the sand at 67 m. The vessel is in good structural condition and makes a good technical dive site.

==== Bulby ====
December 1968: Trawler Bulby scuttled in False Bay. Bulby was built in 1945 in Beverley, Yorkshire, as a steel side trawler. It was powered by a single screw driven by a triple-expansion steam engine, giving a maximum speed of 11.9 knots. The vessel was 45.11 m long, with 7.68 m beam. It was scuttled 2.4 km south of Sunrise beach, Muizenberg in False Bay as an artificial reef in December 1968 at 34°06.998′S 18°31.363′E. The wreck lies on a sand bottom in 17 m of water. It is accessible by boat, but the visibility is usually poor and the wreck is not dived often.

==== Iolite ====
21 March 1969: Trawler Iolite scuttled in False Bay. The coal-fired steam side trawler Iolite was originally built as Navena in 1945 in Beverley, Yorkshire. The vessel was 45.11 m long, 7.68 m beam and 361 tons. It was powered by a triple-expansion steam engine with a superheated boiler providing a top speed of 11.8 knots. The vessel was scuttled as an artificial reef on 21 March 1969, about 2.5 km south of Sunrise Beach, Muizenberg, at 34°07.166′S 18°30.887′E. The wreck lies on a sand bottom at about 18 m depth.

==== Gilia ====
24 November 1969: Trawler Gilia scuttled in Table Bay. The side trawler Gilia was built in Aberdeen in 1946. Length 53.68 m, beam 8.6 m, 515 tons powered by a coal-fired triple-expansion steam engine with a single screw propeller. It was scuttled at the end of its useful life on 24 November 1969, 2.3 km southwest of Robben Islad lighthouse, at 33°49.884′S 18°21.527′E, in 36 m of water, to form an artificial reef. The wreck lies upright on a sandy patch between two rocky ridges, and is quite broken up. The boiler is exposed and basically intact, while the central part of the hull has mostly collapsed.

==== Godetia ====
18 August 1970: Trawler Godetia scuttled in False Bay. Godetia was a steel side trawler built in Aberdeen in 1946. Length 53.68 m, beam 8.60 m, 515 tons, powered by a single triple-expansion steam engine with a coal-fired Scotch boiler. It was sunk by aircraft of the SAAF as a training exercise on 18 August 1970 at 34°06.050′S 18°44.200′E. The wreck lies on broken low reef and sand at a depth of about 17 m of water. The wreck is very broken up and the boiler is the largest recognisable part remaining, with the engine, shaft and propeller extending to the east.

==== Borella ====
1 March 1971: Trawler Borella scuttled in False Bay. Borella was a steel side trawler built in Beverley, Yorkshire in 1946. Length 50.38 m, beam 8.44 m, 524 tons, powered by a triple-expansion steam engine with a top speed of 12.2 knots. The ship was stripped and scuttled as an artificial reef by the SA Navy in False Bay, 2.4 km south of Sunrise Beach, Muizenberg, at 34°07.007′S 18°31.220′E as part of an artificial reef. The wreck lies on its port side partly buried in sand at 18 m depth.

==== Groote Schuur ====
3 February 1972: Trawler Groote Schuur scuttled in Table Bay. Groote Schuur was a steel side trawler built in Beverley, Yorkshire in 1955. Length 42.98 m, beam 8.33 m, 453 tons, powered by a triple-expansion steam engine with a coal-fired Scotch boiler. It was stripped and scuttled on 3 February 1972, 6.9 km southwest of Robben Island lighthouse in 66 m of water, at 33°51.035′S 18°18.798′E. The wreck lies on a sand bottom and is almost competely intact. A sister ship, Groot Constantia, was scuttled nearby and it has not been possible to definitively identify this wreck.

==== Rockeater ====
15 December 1972: Ship Rockeater scuttled in False Bay. Built as USAV FS-168 in New Orleans in 1944, and sold in 1964 to become a marine prospecting vessel, and renamed Rockeater. Length 53.95 m, beam 10.06 m,557 tons, powered by twin propellers and thrusters capable of dynamic positioning to within 8 m. In 1972 Rockeater had reached the end of its useful life and was scuttled in Smitswinkel Bay on 15 December 1972 as an artificial reef at 34°16.126′S 18°28.869′E. The wreck lies upright on a sand bottom at about 33 m. The lattice drilling derrick has toppled over the starboard side, the forecastle has broken off the rest of the hull and pitched forward, and the rest of the hull has dropped downwards due to shell buckling of the lower side plating. The wreck has been a popular dive site for decades.

==== Fong Chung No.11 ====
4 July 1975: Fong Chung No.11 a 200-ton Taiwanese tuna fishing boat, ran aground on Whale Rock in dense fog.

==== L.M. Gemsbok ====
2 September 1975: Ship L.M. Gemsbok foundered in Table Bay. The L.M. Gemsbok was a buoy tender ship built in the Netherlands in 1965. Length 39.22 m, beam 8.33 m, 314 tons, powered by a single diesel engine. It capsized, flooded and sank on 2 September 1975 while transferring a replacement anchor and chain to a tanker in Table Bay 6.1 km west-northwest of Greenpoint lighthouse at 33°53.912′S 18°20.324′E. The wreck is intact and lies on its starboard side on a sand bottom at a depth of 56 m

==== Goel No.1 ====
27 January 1976: Canadian hydrographic ship Goel No.1, of 787 tons, wrecked in a southeast gale on the south of Robben Island.

==== T.S. McEwan ====
9 June 1977: Tug T.S. McEwan scuttled in Table Bay. The T.S. McEwan was a steam tug built in 1925 at Paisley, Renfrewshire, Scotland. Length 48.72 m, beam 10.55 m, 793 tons, powered by two six-cylinder triple-expansion steam engines driving two propellers and four water-tube boilers. The engines could produce 28000 hp, to give a bollard thrust of 30 tons or a top speed of 13 knots. At the time of building it was the most powerful tug in the world. After 50 years of service it was scuttled in Table Bay 11.6 km southwest of Robben Island lighthouse, on a rocky bottom at about 82 m depth, at 33°51.764′S 18°16.166′E. The wreck is roughly upright, with a slight list to starboard, and is somewhat broken up. The superstructure and deck have mostly wasted away, but the boilers and engines are fairly intact.

==== Romelia ====
28 July 1977: Tanker SS Romelia (ex Zodiac, ex Varbergshus) wrecked on the Cape Peninsula. Romelia was a steam tanker of 21,097 tons built in Kiel, Germany in 1959. The sip was powered by two geared turbine sets driving twin propellers with a top speed of 16.5 knots. In 1977, the obsolescent vessels Romelia and Antipolis were under tow from Greece to a breaker's yard in Taiwan by the tug Kiyo Maru No.2, when the towing cable to Antipolis snagged on the bottom near Robben Island and Romelia surged ahead, dragging its cables under the tug. The cable to Antipolis parted, setting it adrift, but the tug was still snagged, and had to be cut free. By this time the towline to Romelia had also snagged on the seabed, and eventually parted, leaving both tankers adrift in the northwesterly gale. Romelia ran aground on 28 July 1977 about 30 m off Sunset Rocks, Llandudno, on the Cape Peninsula, at 34°00.732′S 18°19.810′E. The next day the hull broke in front of the superstructure and the forward section eventually sank, leaving the stern high on the rocks for several years until it too succumbed to the seas. The wreck is very broken up, and the torn and twisted wreckage is strewn over a large area to the northwest of Sunset Rocks. The wreck was more popular as recreational dive site when it was more intact.

==== Antipolis ====
29 July 1977: Tanker SS Antipolis wrecked on the Cape Peninsula. Antipolis was a steam tanker of 24,716 tons, built in Japan in 1959, and powered by two steam turbines geared to a single shaft and screw, giving a top speed of 16.5 knots. In 1977, the obsolescent vessels Romelia and Antipolis were under tow from Greece to a breaker's yard in Taiwan by the tug Kiyo Maru No.2, when the towing cable to Antipolis snagged on the bottom near Robben Island and Romelia surged ahead, dragging its cables under the tug. The cable to Antipolis parted, setting it adrift, but the tug was still snagged, and had to be cut free. By this time the towline to Romelia had also snagged on the seabed, and eventually parted, leaving both tankers adrift in the northwesterly gale. The Antipolis ran aground on 29 July 1977, on the rocky shore at Oudekraal on the Cape Peninsula at 33°58.990′S 18°21.379′E. Attempts to tow it off by the salvage tug Wolraad Wolemade failed, and the wreck settled onto the rocks in relatively shallow water and was partly broken up on site by cutting down to the water level at low tide. The wreck has been a fairly popular recreational dive site with reasonable shore access from a boulder beach.

==== Tristania ====
22 February 1978: Ship Tristania scuttled in Table Bay. Tristania was built as HMS Bay, a Tree-class trawler/minesweeper for the Royal Navy, in Selby, West Yorkshire, in 1940. In 1950 it was re-engined in the Netherlands, and in 1951 taken to Cape Town and refitted for fishing and with accommodation for 12 passengers. As Tristania, it served as the main transport between South Africa and the islands of Tristan da Cunha in the South Atlantic. In 1975 a fire damaged the engine room and it was decided to scrap the vessel. After removing useful equipment, it was towed out and scuttled on 22 February 1978, 6.6 km southwest of Robben Island lighthouse at 33°51.020′S 18°19.004′E. The wreck lies upright on a sand bottom at about 64 m depth, and is substantially intact.

==== SAS Transvaal ====
3 August 1978: Frigate Transvaal scuttled in False Bay. SAS Transvaal was one of three Loch-class frigates in the South African Navy (SAN). She was built as HMS Loch Ard (K602) for the Royal Navy during World War II, but was transferred to the SAN in 1944 before completion and renamed as HMSAS Transvaal. The ship was completed shortly after the German surrender in May 1945 and did not participate in the war.

Transvaal displaced 1,435 long tons (1,458 t) at standard load and 2,260 long tons (2,300 t) at deep load. The ship had an overall length of 307 feet (93.6 m), a beam of 38 feet 7 inches (11.8 m) and a mean deep draught of 12 feet 4 inches (3.8 m). She was powered by a pair of vertical triple-expansion steam engines, each driving one propeller shaft, using steam provided by two Admiralty three-drum boilers. The engines developed a total of 5,500 indicated horsepower (4,100 kW) which gave a maximum speed of 20 knots (37 km/h; 23 mph).

Transvaal was taken out of service on 14 August 1964 and laid up in Simon's Town. She was sold for scrap, together with her sister Good Hope, in 1977. After stripping her of valuable metals and fittings, the hulk was donated to the False Bay Conservation Society for use as an artificial reef and scuttled on 3 August 1978 in Smitswinkel Bay at 34°15.979′S 18°28.770′E.

The wreck lies upright on the sand at a depth of about 34 metres (112 ft). The bow has broken off and much of the hull structure has collapsed.

==== Katsu Maru No. 25 ====
7 August 1978: Ship Katsu Maru No. 25 sank in Hout Bay. The Katsu Maru No. 25 was a fishing vessel built in Namikata, Japan. Length 50.39 m, beam 8.23 m, 299 tons, powered by a diesel engine, with a speed of 11.5 knots. It sank on 7 August 1978, 1.5 km south of the harbour in Hout Bay on the Cape Peninsula after a collision, at 34°03.910′S 18°20.940′E. The wreck lies on its starboard side on a sand bottom at 27 m.

==== Boston Typhoon ====
4 November 1978: Ship Boston Typhoon scuttled in Table Bay. Boston Typhoon was a side trawler built in Beverley, Yorkshire in 1959. Length 42.61 m, beam 8.66 m, 425 tons, powered by a single diesel engine with a top speed of 12 knots. After an engine-room fire in April 1978, the vessel was written off and scuttled on 4 November 1978 as an artificial reef 9.1 km west-southwest of Robben Island lighthouse at 33°50.004′S 18°16.715′E. The wreck lies upright on a sandy bottom at about 81 m depth. The hull is relatively intact but the superstructure is gone.

==== SAS Good Hope ====
12 December 1978: Ship Good Hope scuttled in False Bay. SAS Good Hope (pennant number: F432) was one of three Loch-class frigates in the South African Navy (SAN). It was built as HMS Loch Boisdale (K432) for the Royal Navy during World War II, but was transferred to the SAN before completion in 1944 and renamed as HMSAS Good Hope. The ship was assigned to convoy escort duties in 1945, but did not encounter any enemy ships before the end of the war.

Good Hope displaced 1,435 long tons (1,458 t) at standard load and 2,260 long tons (2,300 t) at deep load. The ship had an overall length of 307 feet (93.6 m), a beam of 38 feet 7 inches (11.8 m) and a mean deep draught of 12 feet 4 inches (3.8 m). It was powered by a pair of vertical triple-expansion steam engines, each driving one propeller shaft, using steam provided by two Admiralty three-drum boilers. The engines developed a total of 5,500 indicated horsepower (4,100 kW) which gave a maximum speed of 20 knots (37 km/h; 23 mph).

The ship was paid off in September 1965 and was sold together with her sister Transvaal, in 1977. After stripping it of all valuable metals and fittings, Good Hope's hulk was donated to the False Bay Conservation Society for use as an artificial reef. She was scuttled on 12 December 1978. in Smitswinkel Bay at 34°16.075′S 18°28.848′E.

The wreck lies approximately upright on a sandy bottom at about 33 m depth. The hull structure has partially collapsed and the upper deck is broken up and parts lie at varying depths and angles. The lattice mast has fallen over to straboard.

==== Arum ====
19 June 1979: Ship Arum sunk in Table Bay approaches. Arum was a steel side trawler built in Beverley, Yorkshire in 1960. Length 38.10 m, beam 8.18 m, 360 tons, powered by a diesel engine giving a top speed of 11.25 knots. It sank on 19 June 1979, 9.3 km southwest of Robben Island after a collision, at 33°52.440′S 18°18.178′E. The wreck lies upright on a sand bottom at about 75 m depth, and is mostly intact, though the wheelhouse and part of the superstructure have wasted away. It has not yet been unambiguously identified, but matches the dimensions and recorded position for Arum.

==== Ker Yar Vor ====
10 August 1979: Ship Ker Yar Vor scuttled off the Cape Peninsula. The Ker Yar Vor was a 292-ton motor fishing vessel built in Ostend, Belgium for the rock lobster fishery. Length 22 m, powered by a single diesel engine. It was scuttled in Leeugat Bay on the Cape Peninsula after taking major damage from an explosion in the engine room, at 34°02.050′S 18°18.630′E. The wreck is very broken up, and only the stern is recognisable. The site is shared by the Jo May.

==== Princess Elizabeth ====
27 June 1983: Trawler Princess Elizabeth scuttled on False Bay. The Princess Elizabeth was a steel side trawler built inBeverley, Yorkshire, in 1961. Length 42.61 m, beam 8.63 m, 419 tons, powered by a Diesel engine, with a top speed of 12 knots. It was scuttled in Smitswinkek Bay on 27 June 1983 to form part of an artificial reef at 34°16.064′S 18°28.827′E. The wreck lies on a sand at33 m, listing slightly to starboard, and is largely intact.

==== Oratava ====
August 1983: Trawler Oratava scuttled in False Bay. Oratava was a steel side trawler built in Beverley, Yorkshire, in 1958. Length 50.37 m, beam 9.27 m, 603 tons, powered by a single diesel engine with a top speed of 12 knots. It was scuttled in August 1983 in Smitswinkel Bay to form part of an artificial reef at 34°16.009′S 18°28.785′E. The wreck lies on a sand bottom at 32 m, listing to port, and is mostly intact.

==== Theresa III ====
1 February 1986: The whaler Theresa III, scuttled for target practice off the Cape Peninsula by the South African Navy.

==== Chanson de la Mer ====
1986: South African yacht Chanson de la Mer, ran aground on Robben Island.

==== Harvest Capella ====
1986: Steel motor fishing boat Harvest Capella wrecked on the Oude Schip headland. 355-ton long liner.

==== Daeyang Family ====
30 March 1986: Ship Daeyang Family ran aground in Table Bay. The Korean bulk carrier Daeyang Family, of 96,760 gross registered tons and deadweight 183570 tons, carrying 180,000 tons of iron ore, dragged anchors in a storm and went aground on the reef at Whale Rock south of Robben Island on 30 March 1986. The hull remained substantially intact until the great gale of 1994. Bult as the ore-bulk-oil carrier Adria Maru in 1972 in Japan. Powered by a single screw and diesel engine with a top speed of 15 knots. Length 312 m. beam 47.6 m. The wreck lies 500 m southeast of Whale Rock in Table Bay at 33°50.383′S 18°23.066′E. The ship has largely broken up and debris is strewn over an area of about 500 m by 400 m.

==== SAS Gelderland ====
21 December 1988: Ship Gelderland scuttled off the Cape Peninsula. SAS Gelderland was built as the Ford-class seaward defence boat HMS Brayfort in Glasgow in 1954. It displaced 120 tons and had a length of 35.74 m and beam of 6.10 m. It was powered by two 12-cylinder Paxman diesels for a top speed of 18 knots, and a centreline Foden diesell for loitering. On 21 December 1988 it was scuttled in Leeugat Bay 630 m northwest of Duiker Point in a classified weapons exercise, at 34°02.068′S 18°18.180′E, which broke the hull into several pieces which lie scattered over a fairly large area.

==== Afrikaner ====
11 October 1993: Ship Afrikaner sank in Table Bay. The Afrikaner was a stern trawler of 860 tons, built in Cape Town in 1970, and powered by a diesel engine with a single screw. Length 54.86 m, beam 11.76 m. It sank on 11 October 1993 while under tow in Table Bay 3.4 km southwest of Robben Island lighthouse as a consequence of damage incurred by grounding on Whale Rock. The wreck is considerably broken up and lies at 33°50.017′S 18°20.686′E in 51 m depth between two shallower areas of rocky reef.

==== Bos 400 ====
27 June 1994: Barge BOS 400 wrecked on the Cape peninsula. BOS 400 was a French derrick/lay barge that ran aground while being towed by the Russian tugboat Tigr on June 26, 1994.

Despite several attempts to refloat, the vessel was considered a total loss as salvors were able to recover little. BOS 400 still has a large crane and part of the superstructure visible above sea level. The wreck is slowly disintegrating. The vessel ran aground on the north side of Duiker Point at 34°02.216′S 18°18.537′E after the tow-line parted during a storm.

==== SAS Pietermaritzburg ====
19 November 1994: Ship Pietermaritzburg scuttled in False Bay. HMS Pelorus (pennant number: J291) was an Algerine-class minesweeper built for the Royal Navy during World War II. On completion, the ship became the flotilla leader of the 7th Minesweeper Flotilla, clearing mines off the east coast of England. In June 1944, the flotilla was assigned to sweep one of the beaches during the Normandy landings.

Pelorus displaced 1,030 long tons (1,047 t) at standard load and 1,325 long tons (1,346 t) at deep load. The ship had an overall length of 225 feet (68.6 m), a beam of 35 feet 6 inches (10.8 m) and a deep draught of 12 feet 3 inches (3.7 m). She was powered by a pair of vertical triple-expansion steam engines, each driving one propeller shaft, using steam provided by two Admiralty three-drum boilers. The engines developed a total of 2,400 indicated horsepower (1,800 kW) which gave a maximum speed of 16.5 knots (30.6 km/h; 19.0 mph).

After the war, she was sold to the South African Navy and renamed HMSAS Pietermaritzburg. The ship was later converted into a midshipmans' training ship during the early 1960s. She served as a barracks ship from 1968 to 1991 when Pietermaritzburg was listed for disposal. The ship was scuttled on 19 November 1994 by the SA Navy as an artificial reef 1 km north of Miller's Point in False Bay at 34°13.297′S 18°28.456′E.

==== Aster ====
9 August 1997: Motor fishing vessel Aster scuttled off the Cape Peninsula. Aster was a 360-ton steel motor fishing trawler built in Hull, England in 1964, with a single engine and shaft. Length 42.62 m, beam 8.18 m. It was converted for lobster fishing and later scuttled on 9 August 1997 as an artificial reef and recreational dive site 1.5 km south of Hout Bay harbour at 34°03.895′S 18°20.958′E. In preparation, the vessel was cleaned of major pollutants, stripped of items that were considered a high risk for entanglement, and a few openings were cut for easier access. The wreck lies upright on the sand bottom at about 26 m. The site is popular with recreational divers, and the structure is intact except for the top and front of the wheelhouse.

==== Han Cheng 2 ====
30 April 1998: Taiwanese fishing trawler Han Cheng 2, ran aground on the north side of Robben Island.

==== Sea Challenger ====
1998: South African service vessel Sea Challenger ran aground on Robben Island while trying to refloat the Han Cheng 2.

=== 2000 to present day ===
==== Treasure ====
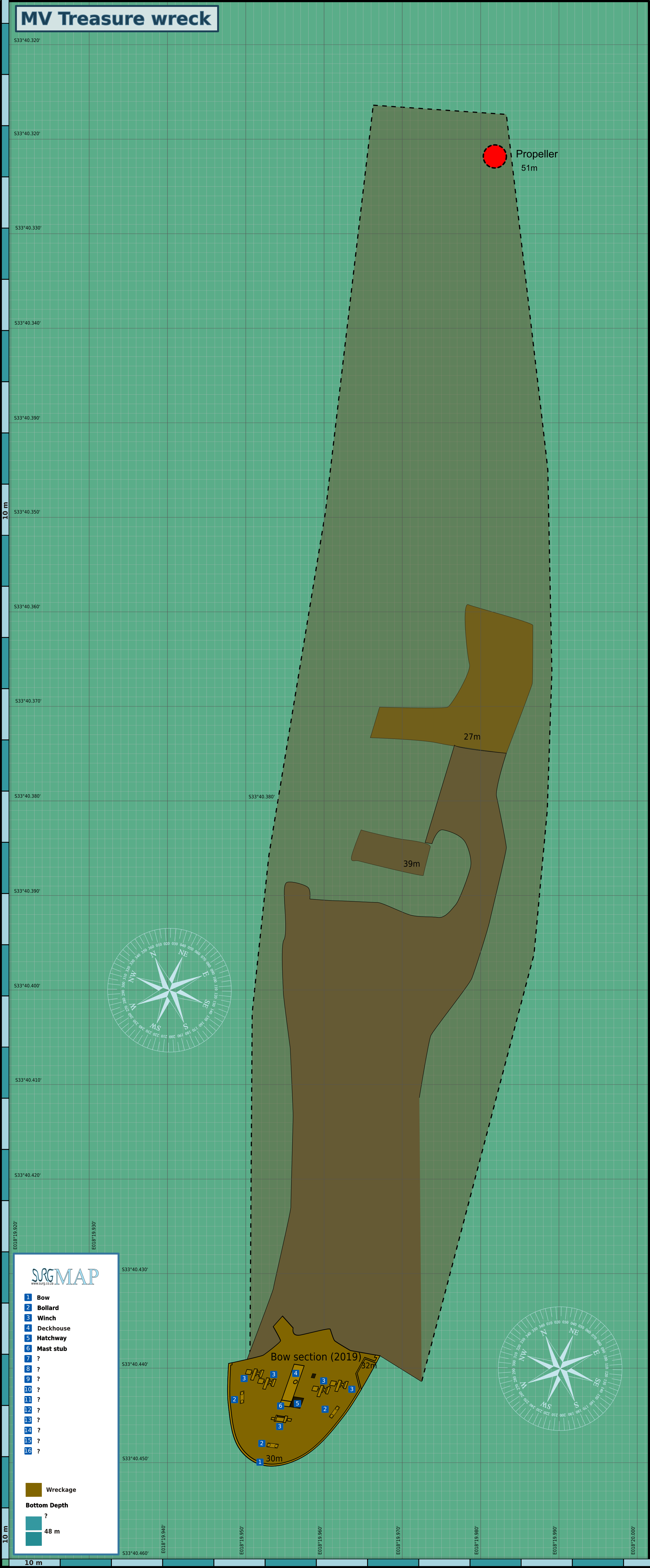
Map of the wreck of the MV Treasure

23 June 2000: Ship Treasure sank off Melkbospunt. MV Treasure was a Panamanian-registered bulk cargo ship. The 17-year-old vessel was transporting 140,000 tonnes (140,000 long tons; 150,000 short tons) of iron ore from China to Brazil at the time of the incident. The Weekend Argus newspaper quoted unnamed sources as saying the ship was owned by Universal Pearls, which it claimed to be the same Chinese shipping company that owned Apollo Sea (which sank off Cape Town's coast in 1994 and caused extensive environmental damage).

Treasure sank on 23 June 2000 from underwater structural damage sustained in foul weather. The vessel went down 6 mi (9.7 km) off the coast of South Africa, between Robben Island and Dassen Island after developing a hole in her hull. Authorities wanted to tow the ship into the South African harbor for repair, but it was too large and was ordered farther off-shore in an attempt to reduce environmental damage from fuel oil pollution. While under tow in rough seas the tow cables parted and the ship then drifted eastward and sank. The ship's crew were airlifted to safety.

Treasure became a recreational dive site. The ship's large size and the facts that its hull is resting on a flat sand bottom at 51 metres (167 ft) down, and part of its main deck was within 30 metres (98 ft) of the surface, coupled with its location in the Bloubergstrand area, have contributed to its popularity.

The wreck lies on the sand at about 11.5 km northwest of Melkbospunt at 33°40.382′S 18°19.969′E, and is quite broken up. The superstructure lies on the sand on the south side of the stern of the hull.

==== Seli 1 ====
8 September 2009: Ship Seli 1 stranded in Table Bay. The MV Seli 1 was a Turkish bulk carrier, operated by TEB Maritime of Istanbul, that was en route to Gibraltar when it was driven aground off Bloubergstrand near Table Bay, South Africa by strong westerly winds shortly after midnight on 8 September 2009, having reported engine failure and a snapped anchor chain.

The ship was carrying 30,000 tons of coal, 660 tons of heavy fuel oil and 60 tons of diesel fuel. Strong westerly winds blew the ship from anchorage shortly after midnight on 8 September 2009, and drove it aground near Bloubergstrand, Cape Town. The crew were rescued by the NSRI boats from Station 18 and Station 3.

The Seli 1 "sustained significant structural damage", but could have been refloated. However, this did not happen and the ship was extensively damaged by late winter storms Initial salvage operations focused on removal of 630,000 litres of oil from the ship. Eventually the ship was broken up on site and much of the wreckage removed as scrap The wreck lies 530 m off Bloubergstrand, Table Bay, at 33°49.473′S 18°28.261′E.

== Unidentified wrecks ==
A further 22 wrecks have been found and surveyed by multibeam sonar, but have not been identified as of early 2025.

- 33°49.057′S 18°16.405′E, 45 m length, 80 m depth
- 33°49.429′S 18°14.888′E, 40 m length, 92 m depth
- 33°49.970′S 18°16.081′E, 46 m length, 85 m depth
- 33°50.648′S 18°15.445′E, 28 m length, 89 m depth
- 33°50.761′S 18°17.407′E, 25.5 m length, 77 m depth
- 33°50.970′S 18°16.387′E, 40 m length, 83.5 m depth
- 33°51.252′S 18°16.543′E, 42,5 m length, 82.5 m depth
- 33°51.936′S 18°18.987′E, 41 m length, 66.5 m depth
- 33°52.038′S 18°13.028′E, 41.5 m length, 108.5 m depth
- 33°52.111′S 18°17.872′E, 38.8 m length, 76.5 m depth
- 33°52.524′S 18°19.715′E, 17.5 m length, 60 m depth
- 33°53.714′S 18°14.105′E, 44 m length, 98.5 m depth
- 33°53.714′S 18°30.149′E, 8.8 m length, 5 m depth
- 34°11.958′S 18°34.036′E, 27 m length, 41 m depth
- 34°12.476′S 18°30.954′E, 30 m length, 40 m depth
- 34°13.348′S 18°40.426′E, 18.5 m length, 54 m depth
- 34°15.630′S 18°39.436′E, 42.3 m length, 60 m depth
- 34°15.769′S 18°30.477′E, 27 m length, 47 m depth
- 34°15.769′S 18°30.477′E, 25 m length, 47 m depth
- 34°16.394′S 18°30.121′E, 21 m length, 47 m depth
- 34°17.259′S 18°38.202′E, 25 m length, 68 m depth
- 34°21.283′S 18°36.108′E, 30 m length, 81 m depth

== Wrecks of uncertain location ==
There are also vessels known or reported to have been lost in this vicinity, but their positions are not known, or no wreckage remains.

- 25 January 1989: Motor fishing vessel Harvest Pegasus scuttled by torpedo from the S.A.S. Emily Hobhouse, southwest of Cape Point. Position vague, may have been far offshore.

== Unconfirmed ==
- c.1720: Dutch East Indiaman Hollandia Caught fire and sank in Simon's Bay (dubious?)
- 1740: Rooswijk, near the Vis?
- HMS Trident struck Whittle Rock and sank There were several ships of the Royal Navy named Trident. The source states that the Euphrates incident was later, making this pre-1810. The only HMS Trident that was in service around this time was HMS Trident (1768), which was also in service at the date when the "HMS Indent" was reportedly damaged "off Miller's Point" post c.1795.
- 27 January 1894: Wooden sailing schooner Crystal Wave capsized in Hout Bay in a violent squall. It is assumed that it foundered after capsizing, but this is uncertain.
- 1903: Rex wrecked in the vicinity of Fish Hoek
- 21 January 1911: The Shaw Savill steamer Aotea ran aground about 100 m off Green Point: It was refloated after about two months and towed to Cape Town. (Image on flickr https://www.flickr.com/photos/hilton-t/16758742219/in/photostream/)
- Shian Feng Chang: Steel fishing boat stranded at Woodstock beach, shortly before 26 August 1974 https://www.flickr.com/photos/hilton-t/16758751539/in/photostream/

== Erroneous reports ==
Some vessels have been reported to have been wrecked in this region, but there is strong evidence that they were not:

- British East Indiaman Euphrates: Claimed to have struck Whittle Rock and sank in about 1810 The ship may well have struck Whittle Rock, but did not sink, as the Euphrates (1803 EIC ship) is recorded as having been wrecked off Dondra Head, Ceylon on 1 January 1813. A later East Indiaman, also named Euphrates, and built in 1834 was lost off Holyhead, Wales, in 1868.
- Frigate HMS Révolutionnaire (1794) was stranded in Simon's Bay on 29 July 1816, but could not have been wrecked as it was broken up on 4 October 1822 after further service.
- Brig-sloop HMS Zebra (1815) was stranded in Simon's Bay on 29 July 1816, but not wrecked, as it was eventually wrecked on 2 December 1840, when a heavy gale drove it ashore and wrecked it off Mount Carmel near Haifa.
- Cospatrick British flag, 17 November 1874. A wooden 3-masted full-rigged sailing ship that caught fire and sank south of the Cape of Good Hope, with a loss of 469 lives. at about 37°S 12°E, quite a long way from Cape Town in the South Atlantic.

== See also ==
- Artificial reef – Human-made underwater structure that functions as a reef
- Cape Town – Legislative capital of South Africa
- List of shipwrecks of Africa
- Lists of shipwrecks
- Marine salvage – Recovering a ship or cargo after a maritime casualty
- Scuttling – Act of deliberately sinking a ship by allowing water to flow into the hull
- Sinking ships for wreck diving sites – Scuttling old ships to produce artificial reefs
- Shipwreck – Physical remains of a beached or sunk ship
- Shipwrecking – Event causing a ship to wreck
