= BOS 400 =

Wreck and dive site at Duiker Point on the Cape Peninsula west coast

Coordinates: 34°2′13.28″S 18°18′31.18″E

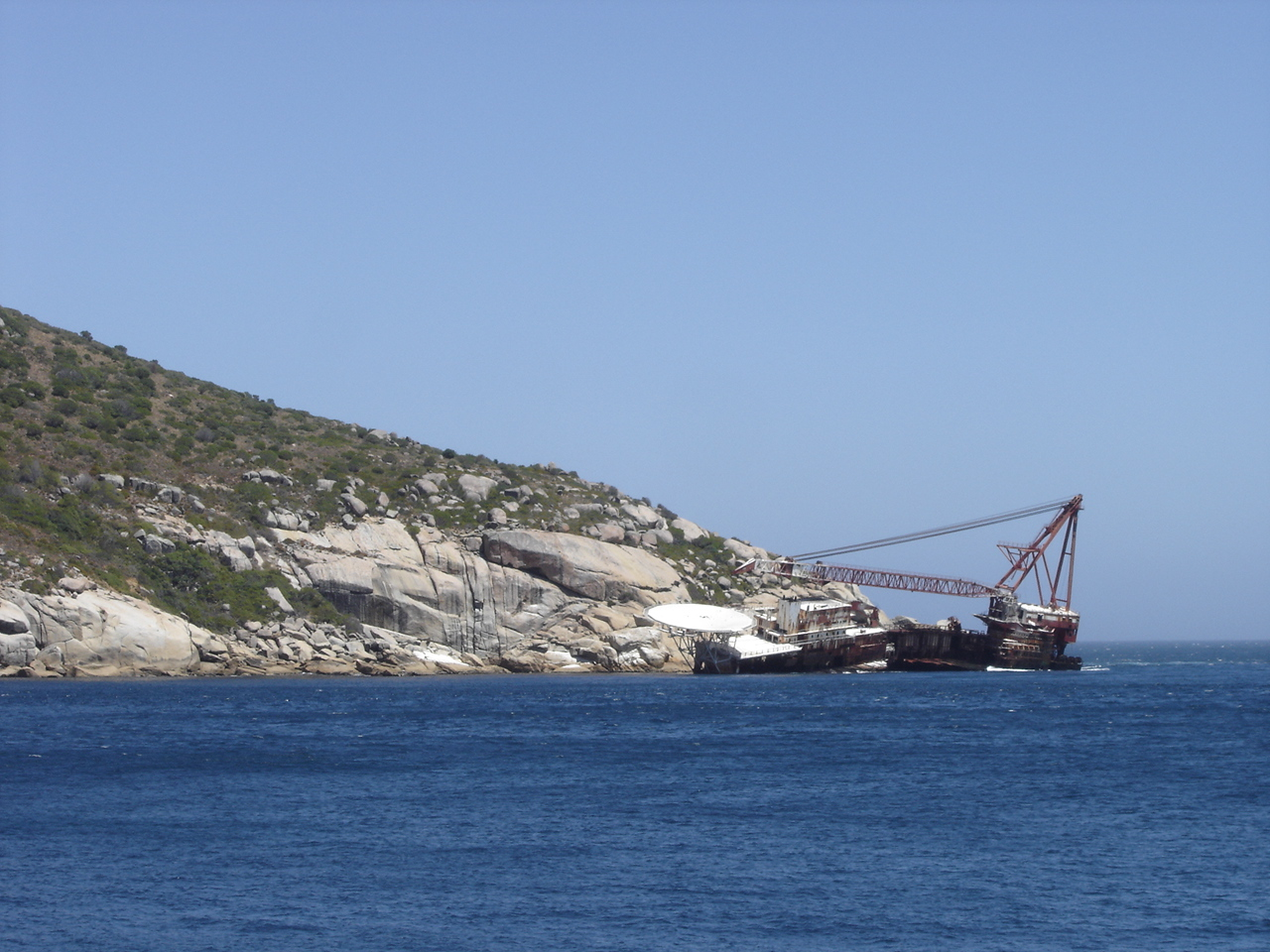
- BOS 400 wreck off Duiker Point, South Africa

History
- Name: BOS 400
- Fate: Ran aground, 26 June 1994

General characteristics
- Type: Derrick/lay barge
- Displacement: 12,000 long tons (12,193 t)
- Length: 100 m (330 ft)

Western Cape, South Africa

BOS 400 was a French derrick/lay barge that ran aground while being towed by the Russian tugboat Tigr on June 26, 1994.

Tigr was chartered to tow BOS 400 from Pointe-Noire in the Republic of Congo to Cape Town, South Africa. The tow-cable broke during a force 9 northwesterly gale and caused the vessel to run aground off Duiker Point near Sandy Bay, at the same place as the earlier wreck of the SS Oakburn.

Despite several towage attempts, the shipwreck was considered a total loss as salvors were able to recover little from the wreck. BOS 400 remains a wreck with a large crane and part of the superstructure visible above sea level. The wreck is slowly disintegrating.

Tigr was built in 1987 in Polish shipyards. Following the accident, she remained idle in the Cape Town docks from 1994 to 2000, when she was sold for $625,000.

== See also ==
- Shipwrecks of Cape Town
