= POA =

POA or Poa may refer to:

== Organisations ==
- Pakistan Olympic Association
- POA (trade union), for UK prison officers
- Prison Officers' Association (Ireland)
- Russian Liberation Army

== Science and technology ==
- Poa, a genus in Poaceae (the grass family)
- Place of articulation, a linguistic term
- Pony of the Americas, a horse breed
- Portable Object Adapter, in the CORBA specification
- Preoptic area, a brain region
- Price of anarchy, a concept in game theory
- Program of Activities, for UNFCCC Clean Development Mechanism
- Proof-of-authority, a blockchain algorithm

== Law ==
- Power of attorney
- Public Order Act
- Property owner association or homeowner association

== Music ==
- Paris Opera Awards
- POA (album), 1973, by Blocco Mentale
- "POA", a song from Future (Future album)
- P.O.A: Pop on Arrival, 2005 album by Beat Crusaders

== Places ==
- Poa, Bazèga, Burkina Faso
- Poa, Boulkiemdé, Burkina Faso
- Poá, São Paulo, Brazil
- Pacific Ocean Areas, World War II military command
- Po Lam station, Hong Kong, China, station code
- Salgado Filho International Airport, Porto Alegre, Brazil, IATA code

== Other ==
- Price on application, abbreviation
