= Diving With a Purpose =

American non-profit organization

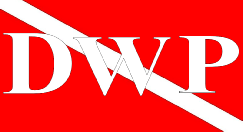
- Formation: 2005
- Founders: Kenneth Stewart, Brenda Lanzendorf
- Type: Nonprofit
- Purpose: Maritime archaeology, focused on research of the Atlantic slave trade
- Location: Nashville, Tennessee, United States
- Website: divingwithapurpose.org

Diving With a Purpose (DWP) is an American non-profit organization aimed at locating and documenting shipwrecks, predominantly those related to the Atlantic slave trade.

== History ==
Diving With a Purpose was founded in 2005 by Kenneth Stewart (born 1944/45), a retired copier repairman with the Tennessee Aquatic Project and the National Association of Black Scuba Divers, and Brenda Lanzendorf (1958–2008), a maritime archaeologist at Biscayne National Park. They met during the filming of the 2004 documentary The Guerrero Project, a film chronicling efforts to locate the wreck of Spanish slave ship Guerrero, which are still ongoing, although a likely candidate has since been discovered.

DWP was featured in 2020 television documentary series Enslaved, featuring DWP member Kramer Wimberley, starring and produced by Samuel L. Jackson. It is also the subject of a 2021 documentary titled Lessons from the Water: Diving with a Purpose by filmmaker Charles Todd.

== Activities ==
Roughly 300 divers have participated in Diving With a Purpose's maritime archaeology program since its foundation. The program includes one week of training and requires some prior experience, with the stated aim of training divers to become "able to assist in the historical documentation and preservation of artifacts and wreck sites". An offshoot program directed at a younger audience entitled Youth Diving With a Purpose (YDWP) was introduced in 2011.

The group has been involved with the discovery or documentation of numerous (Note: Per the group's website, 18 as of 2021, with 18,000 volunteer hours.) shipwrecks, including the São José Paquete Africa and the Clotilda. Other activities of the organization have included the location and mapping of plane wrecks related to the Tuskegee Airmen in the Great Lakes. A memorial site in Port Huron, Michigan, was constructed in 2021.

Diving With a Purpose has worked or is working with groups and federal agencies including NOAA, the National Park Service (NPS), the Society of Black Archaeologists, and the Slave Wrecks Project, a collaboration between DWP, the Smithsonian's National Museum of African American History and Culture, the NPS, George Washington University, Iziko South African Museum, and the South African Heritage Resources Agency.
