= Slave Wrecks Project =

Slave ships archaeology

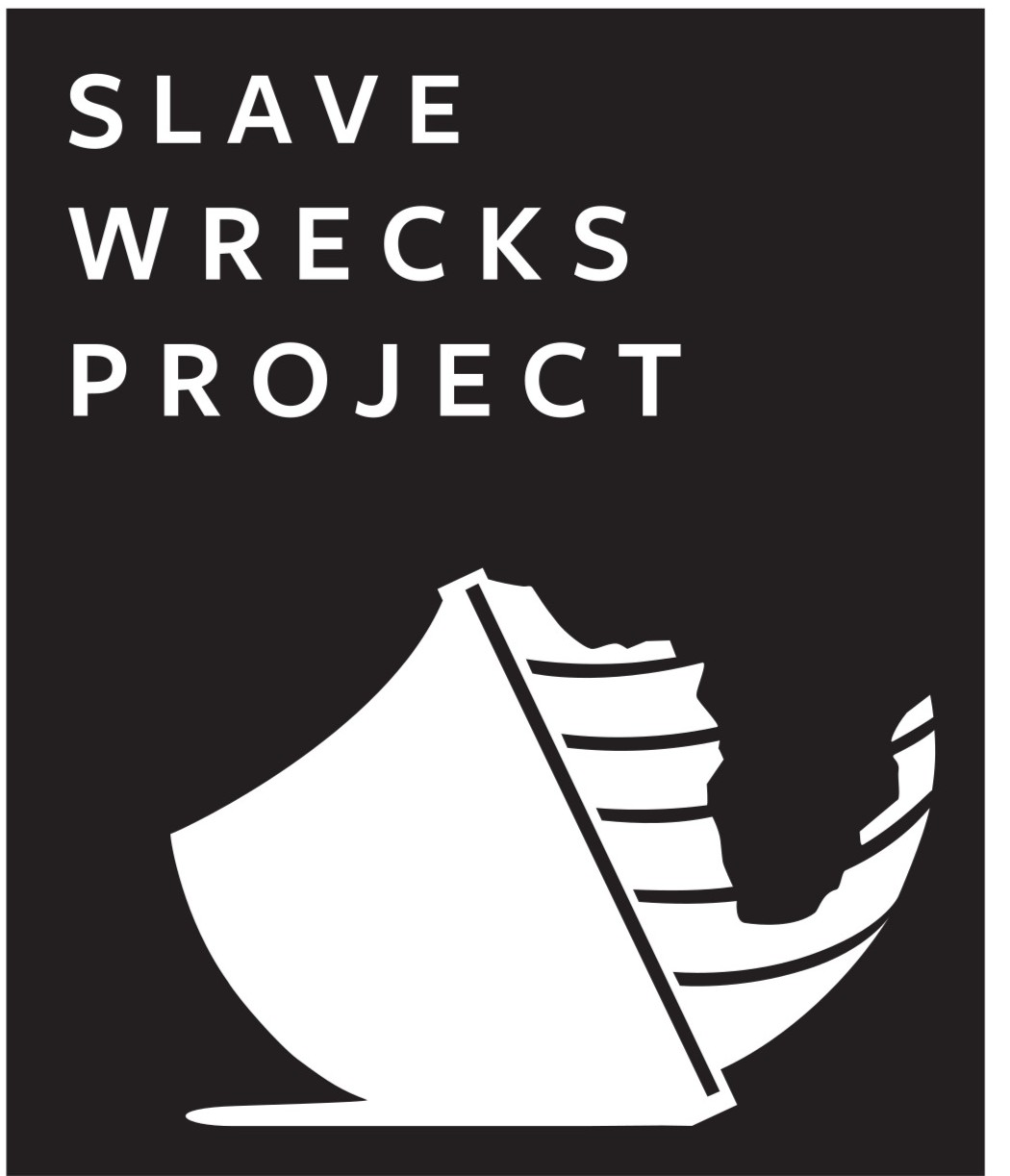
Slave Wrecks Project

The Slave Wrecks Project (SWP) is a U.S.-based initiative coordinated by the Smithsonian Institution's National Museum of African American History and Culture and George Washington University. It was founded in 2008 to study shipwrecks from the transatlantic slave trade and promote study on the legacies of slavery. Today, the Slave Wrecks Project and its partners work in six countries. Currently, its work is focused both on underwater archaeology and public education.

== History ==
When the project was launched in 2008, it was named the African Slave Wrecks and Diaspora Heritage Routes Project. At the time, it was a collaboration between George Washington University (GWU), the United States National Park Service Submerged Resources Center, and Iziko Museums of South Africa. In 2011, two new partners joined the Slave Wrecks Project, Diving With a Purpose and the Smithsonian National Museum of African American History and Culture (NMAAHC).

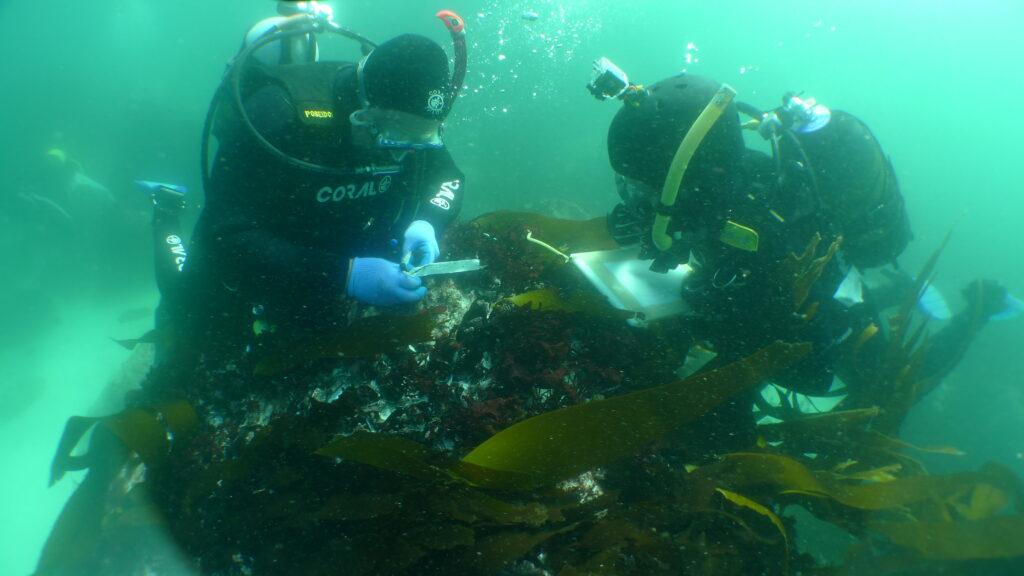
Divers working on the site of the São José outside of Cape Town.

In the early years, the Slave Wrecks Project primarily focused on the investigation of the São José Paquete d'África. The São José was a Portuguese vessel that sank in 1794 off the coast of Cape Town, South Africa, while traveling between Mozambique and Brazil with 512 captive Mozambicans on board. In 2015, an announcement was made that the ship was located and identified by the Project and its partners. Artifacts recovered from the São José Paquete d'África are now on display at NMAAHC in Washington, D.C., United States, and Iziko Museums of South Africa in Cape Town.

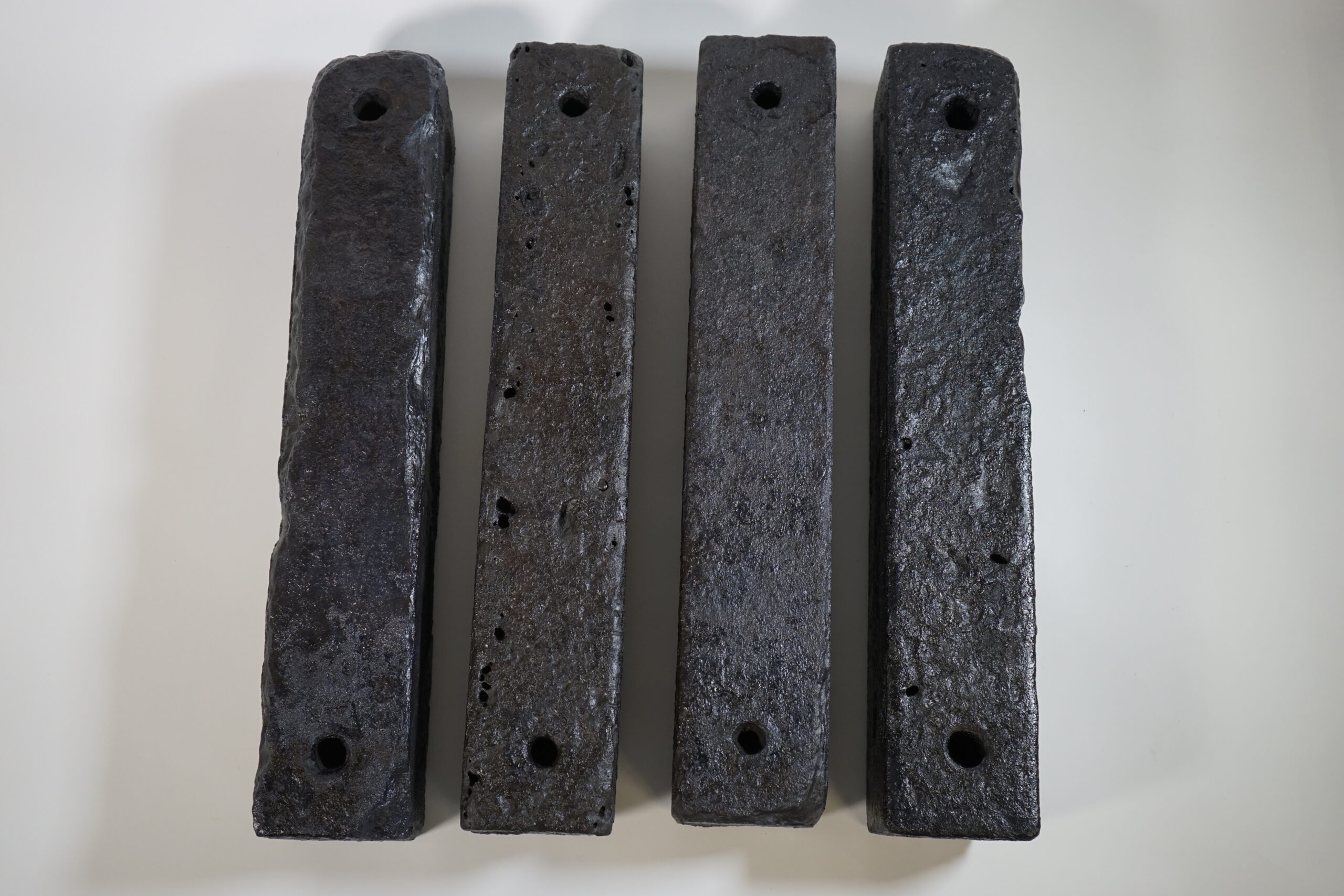
Iron ballasts from the São José.

Also in 2015, the National Museum of History and Culture (NMAAHC) became co-coordinator of the project alongside George Washington University, and the project was officially renamed the Slave Wrecks Project. In the years since 2015, the Slave Wrecks Project has grown its international network to include partners in the United States, Brazil, Mozambique, Senegal, and Portugal.

== Programs ==
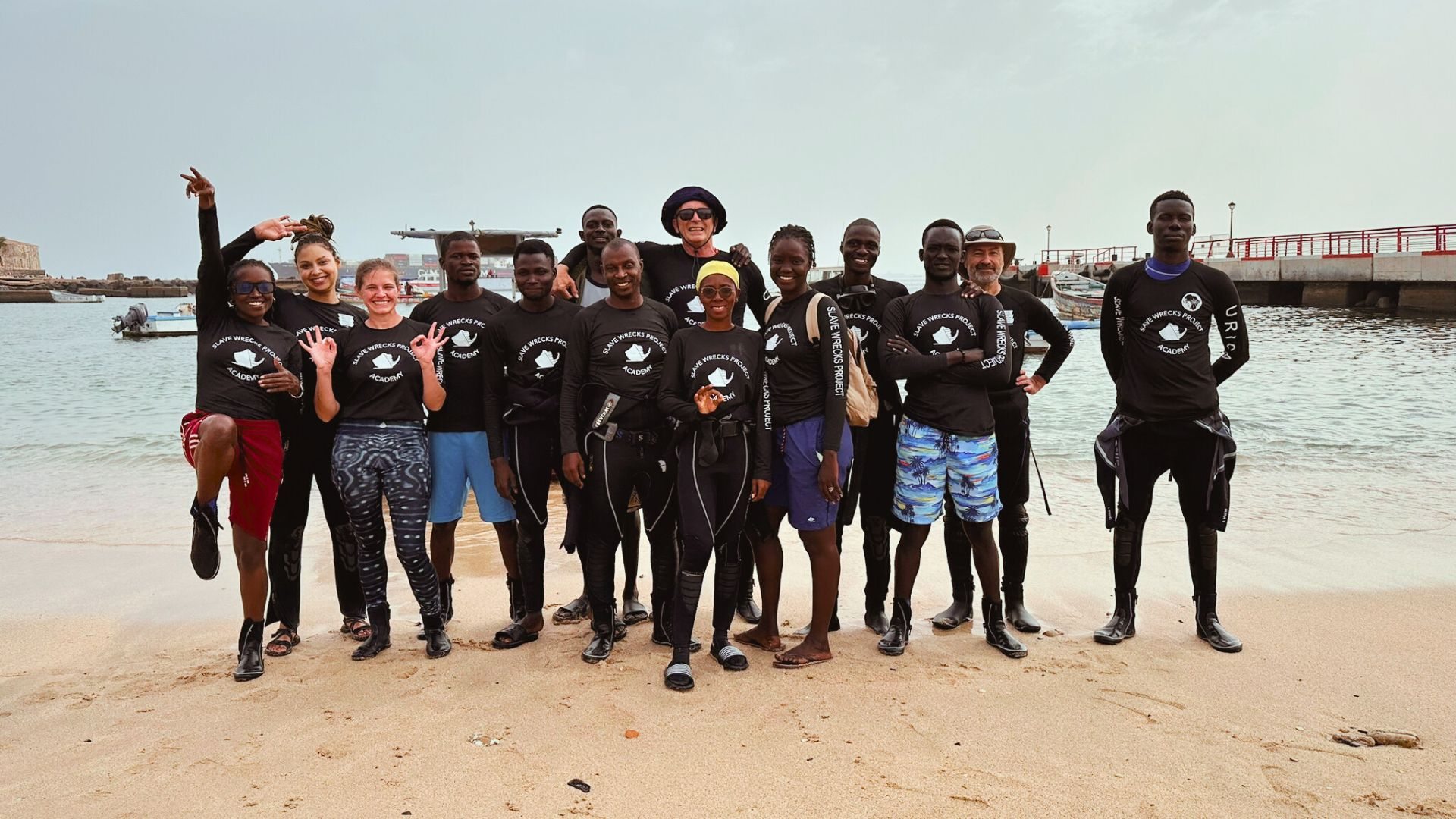
SWP-A participants and instructors in Senegal.

The Slave Wrecks Project operates a variety of programs:

- In 2022, SWP began the Slave Wrecks Project Academy (SWP-A) in Senegal. The academy was created to support the work of early-career maritime archaeologists from across Africa and the African diaspora.
- In 2018, SWP launched the Community Stewards of Heritage Program on Mozambique Island. The program trains community members in scuba diving and archaeological documentation in and around the island.

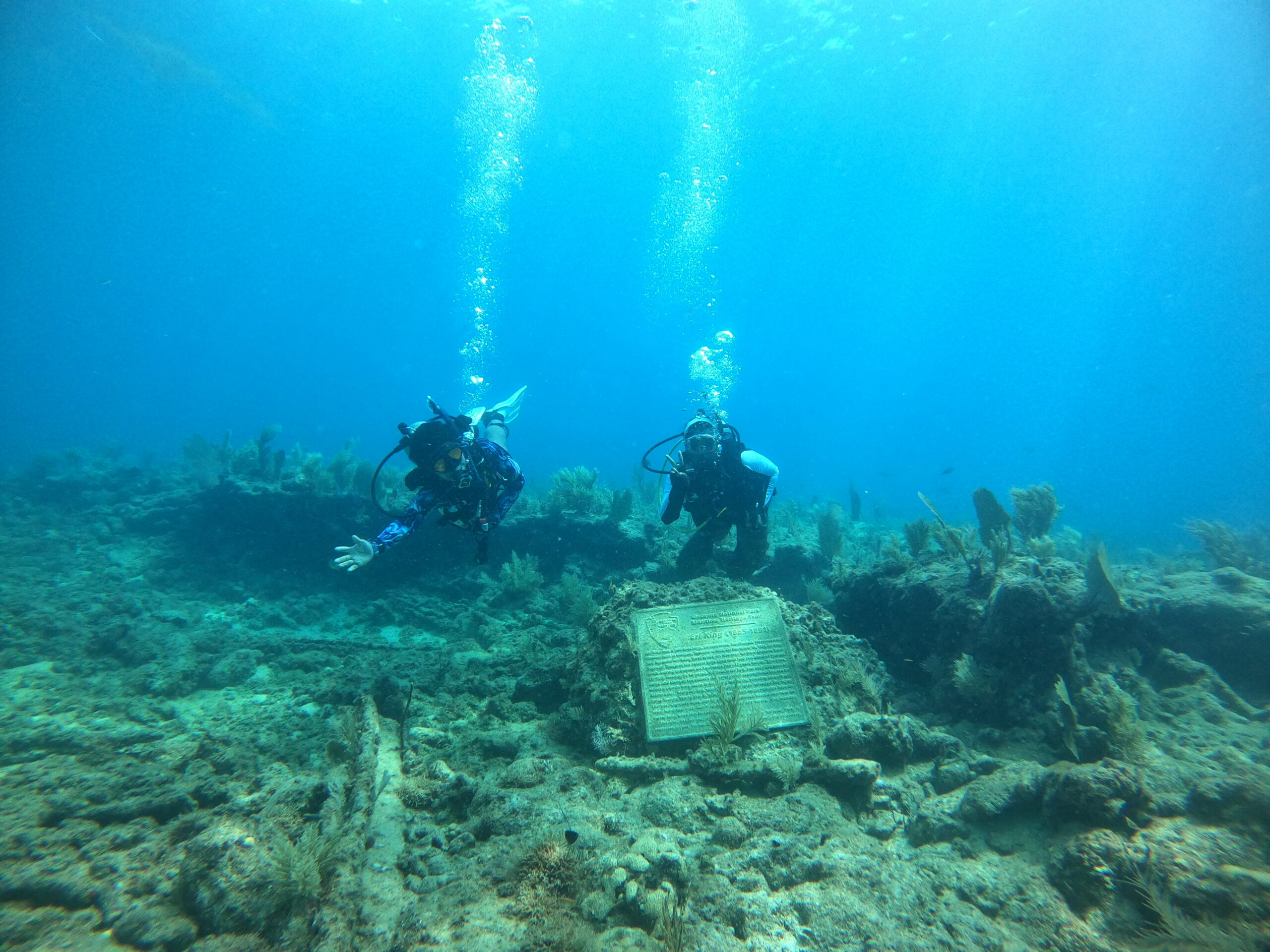
Interns diving in Biscayne Florida.

- SWP cohosts with graduate student interns in Biscayne National Park.
- SWP works with youth programs in Alabama and Florida to promote early engagement in underwater archaeology. Organizations they work with include the Youth Diving With a Purpose program, Swim to Scuba, and Junior Scientists in the Sea.
- In 2024, the Slave Wrecks Project ran a teacher training workshop called "Difficult Legacies, Difficult Histories" at the Calouste Gulbenkian Foundation. This workshop focused on teaching educators how to have conversations with students about the transatlantic slave trade, racial slavery, and racism. "Difficult Legacies, Difficult Histories" convened for a second year in 2025.

== Locations ==
Africatown, USA:

The Slave Wrecks Project collaborates with partners in Africatown, Alabama, to conduct terrestrial archaeological work, provide swimming and scuba diving lessons, and engage in public interpretation. In 2018, SWP joined the effort to locate the Clotilda, the last known American-owned slave ship that brought captive Africans from Benin to Mobile Bay, Alabama, U.S.A., in 1862. Some survivors of this voyage founded the community of Africatown near Mobile Bay. The formal identification and location of the ship were announced in 2019.

Biscayne National Park, USA:

Since 2012, the Slave Wrecks Project has conducted underwater archaeological work in Biscayne National Park.

Brazil

In 2023, the Slave Wrecks Project first visited Brazil to support the identification of the brig Camargo. The Camargo is believed to be the last ship to bring enslaved Africans to Brazil and was burned off the coast to hide its use as a slave ship. Work to identify and recover the Camargo is led by SWP's partner organization, the AfrOrigens Institute. Today, AfrOrigens and the SWP are working with the descendant community of those held captive on the Camargo in the nearby Quilombo Santa Rita do Bracuí to understand the modern impacts of this history.

Mozambique

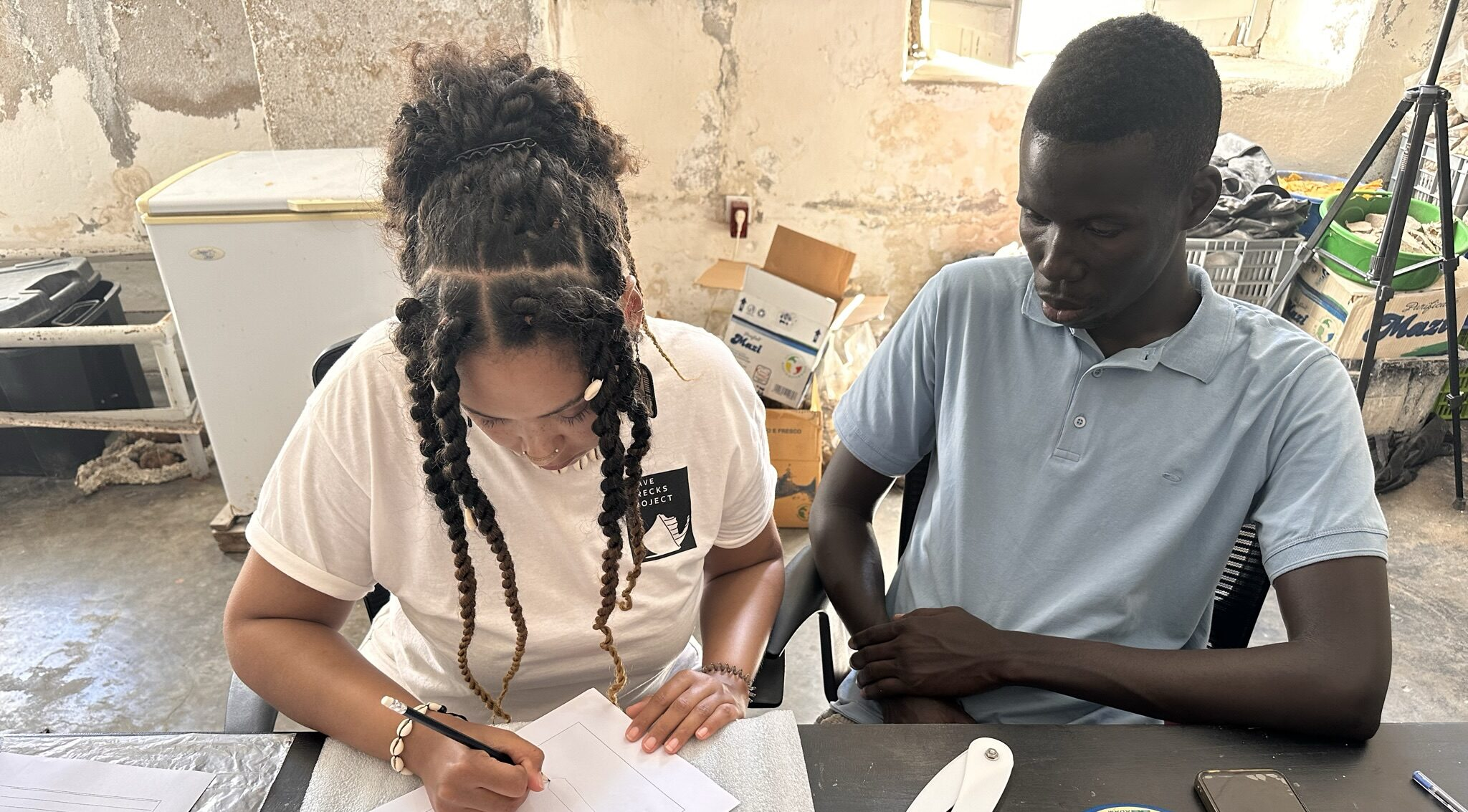
Archaeologist working in Mozambique

Since 2013, the Slave Wrecks Project has collaborated with the Department of Archaeology and Anthropology at Universidade Eduardo Mondlane and Centro de Arqueologia Investigação e Recursos da Ilha de Moçambique (CAIRIM). They primarily focus on the Mozambique Island region.

In 2023, after years of survey and archival research, a SWP team began documenting the site of the ship L'Aurore. The L'Aurore was carrying over 600 enslaved Africans when it sank in a storm in 1790. During the storm, the crew refused to open the hatches, fearing a mutiny, trapping the 600 people below deck. As a result, hundreds of captive Africans drowned.

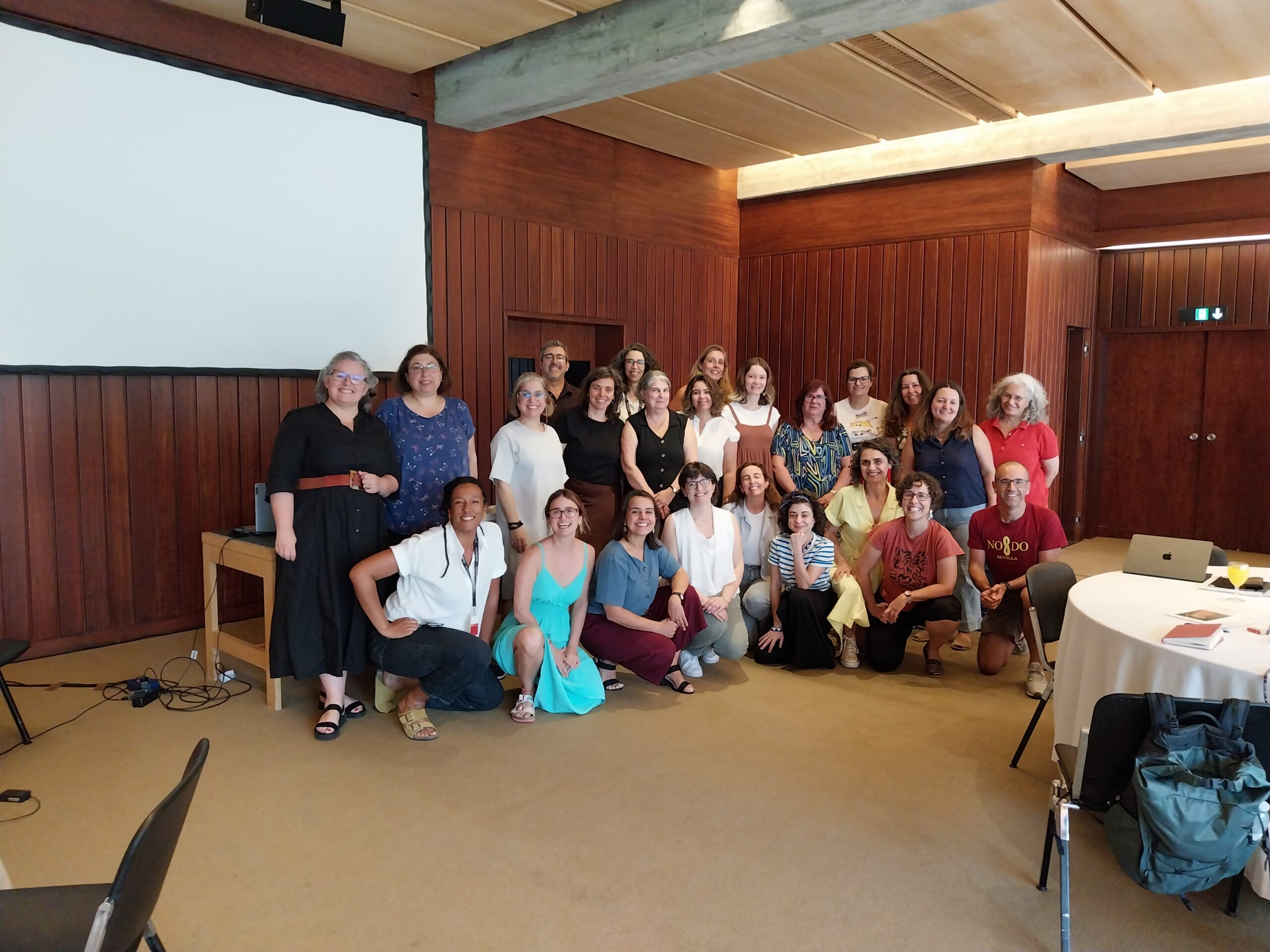
Participants at a workshop in Portugal, 2025

Portugal

In 2013, members of the Slave Wrecks Project team began collaborating with Portuguese colleagues to conduct research in Portuguese archives, focusing on the story of the slave ship São José Paquete d’África.

Subsequently, SWP has worked closely with the Museum of Lisbon and the National Museum of Natural History and Science to support their efforts, sharing the history of Portugal's role in the slave trade.

Senegal

Since 2014, SWP has supported a network of researchers based in the Laboratoire d’Archéologie, Institut Fondamental d’Afrique Noire (IFAN), at the Université Cheikh Anta Diop. Through nearly a decade of dive training and skill-building, SWP is helping its partners establish West Africa's first maritime archaeological team, composed of and led by archaeologists from Africa.

South Africa

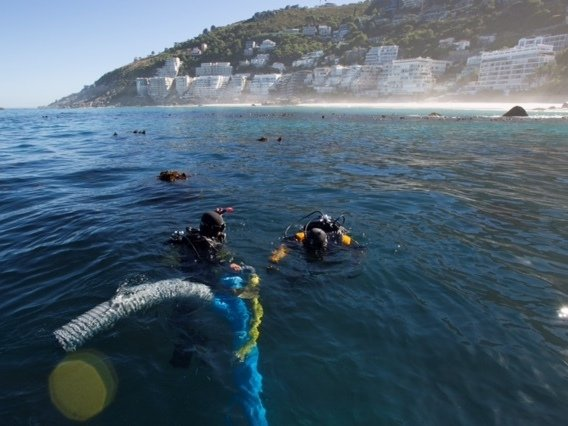
Divers working on the site of the São José in South Africa

In 2008, the organization that became SWP was initially focused on several sites in southern Africa. One of these sites resulted in the identification and excavation of the São José Paquete D’África. The SWP and its collaborators continue to identify, explore, and report on other ships in South Africa that bring the stories of the enslaved into memory.

St. Croix, USA

Since 2015, the Slave Wrecks Project has developed a network of collaborators devoted to exploring the history and legacies of slavery and freedom on Saint Croix, U.S. Virgin Islands. The organization's work in Saint Croix includes exhibits, terrestrial archaeology, and training for collaborators and students.

== Structure ==
The Slave Wrecks Project is hosted by the George Washington University and the Smithsonian's National Museum of African American History and Culture. Outside of the coordinating offices, SWP is led by the International Leadership Team, made up of partners from the following institutions: National Museum of African American History and Culture, George Washington University, Instituto ArOrigens, Diving With a Purpose, NPS Submerged Resources Center, Cultural Engineering and Anthropology Research Unit (URICA), Centro de Arqueologia Investigação e Recursos Ilha de Moçambique at Universidade Eduardo Mondlane.
