= Atlantic Seaboard, Cape Town =

Sub-region of Cape Town, South Africa

Atlantic Seaboard
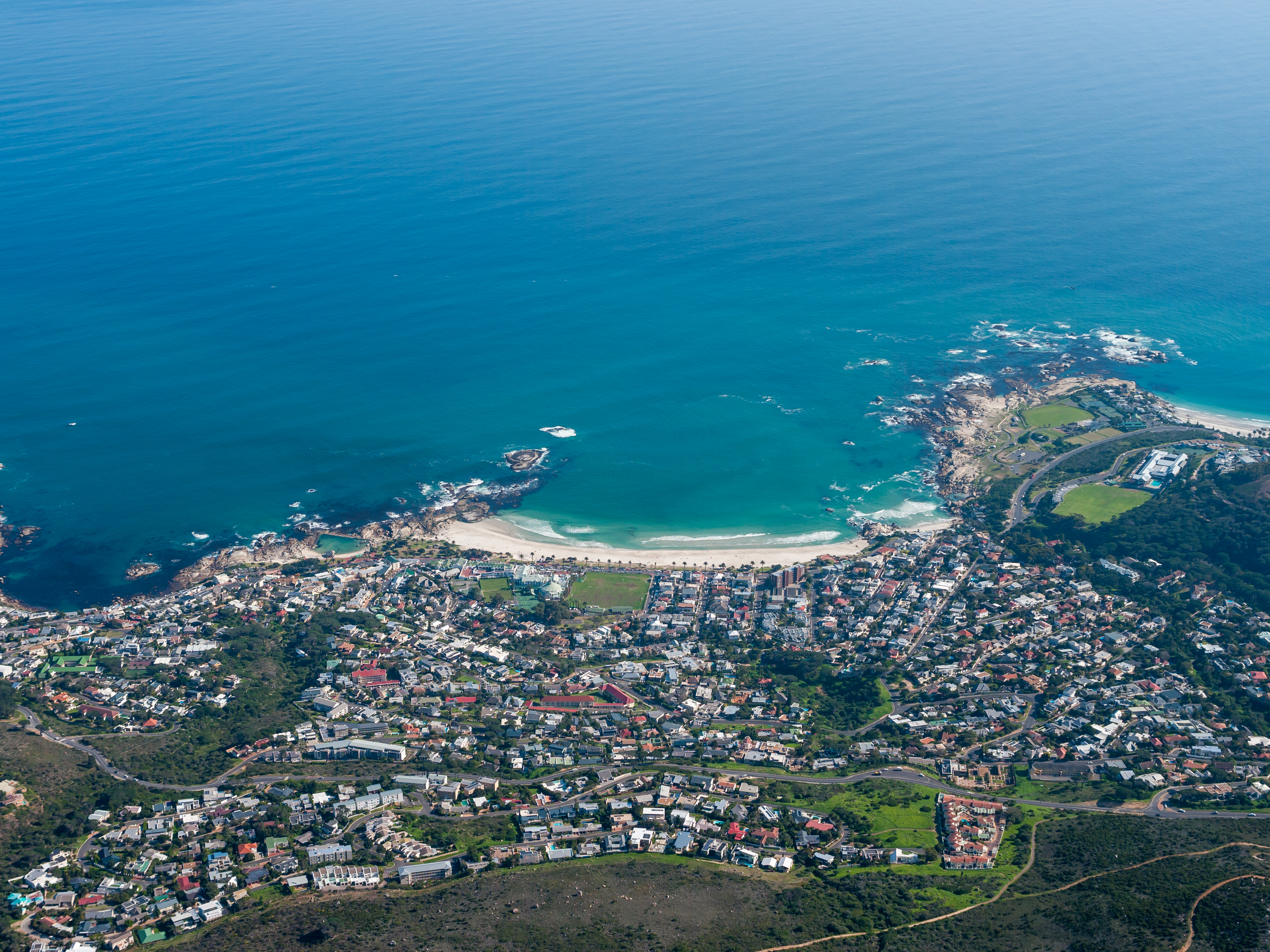
- Camps Bay, in the center of the Atlantic Seaboard
- Interactive map of Atlantic Seaboard
- Coordinates: 33°57′00″S 18°23′00″E
- Country: South Africa
- Province: Western Cape
- Municipality: City of Cape Town

Area
  - Total: 24.73 km^{2} (9.55 sq mi)

Population (2011)
  - Total: 41,295
  - Density: 1,670/km^{2} (4,325/sq mi)
- Time zone: UTC+2 (SAST)
- Area code: 021

The Atlantic Seaboard is a group of predominantly affluent, Anglophone seaside suburbs in Cape Town, Western Cape, South Africa. The region, situated along the coast, to the west of Cape Town CBD, is home to a mix of detached homes and apartment buildings. Due to its location and views, it features some of the most desirable property in South Africa.

== Location ==
The Atlantic Seaboard region begins to the west of Cape Town CBD, in Green Point. The region wraps in a southwesterly direction around the coastline of the South Atlantic, ending in Llandudno, to the south of Oudekraal Nature Reserve.

The region is therefore located within close proximity to the CBD, Cape Town's main economic hub, but is detached from it, for a more peaceful living environment.

Camps Bay, at roughly the center of the Atlantic Seaboard, is approximately 6 km from Cape Town CBD, 12 km from Hout Bay, and 24 km from Cape Town International Airport, and right below the western side of the Table Mountain National Park.

== Suburbs ==
The 11 suburbs that comprise the Atlantic Seaboard are:

- Bakoven
- Bantry Bay
- Camps Bay
- Clifton
- Fresnaye
- Green Point
- Llandudno
- Mouille Point
- Sea Point
- Three Anchor Bay
- V&A Waterfront

== Lifestyle ==
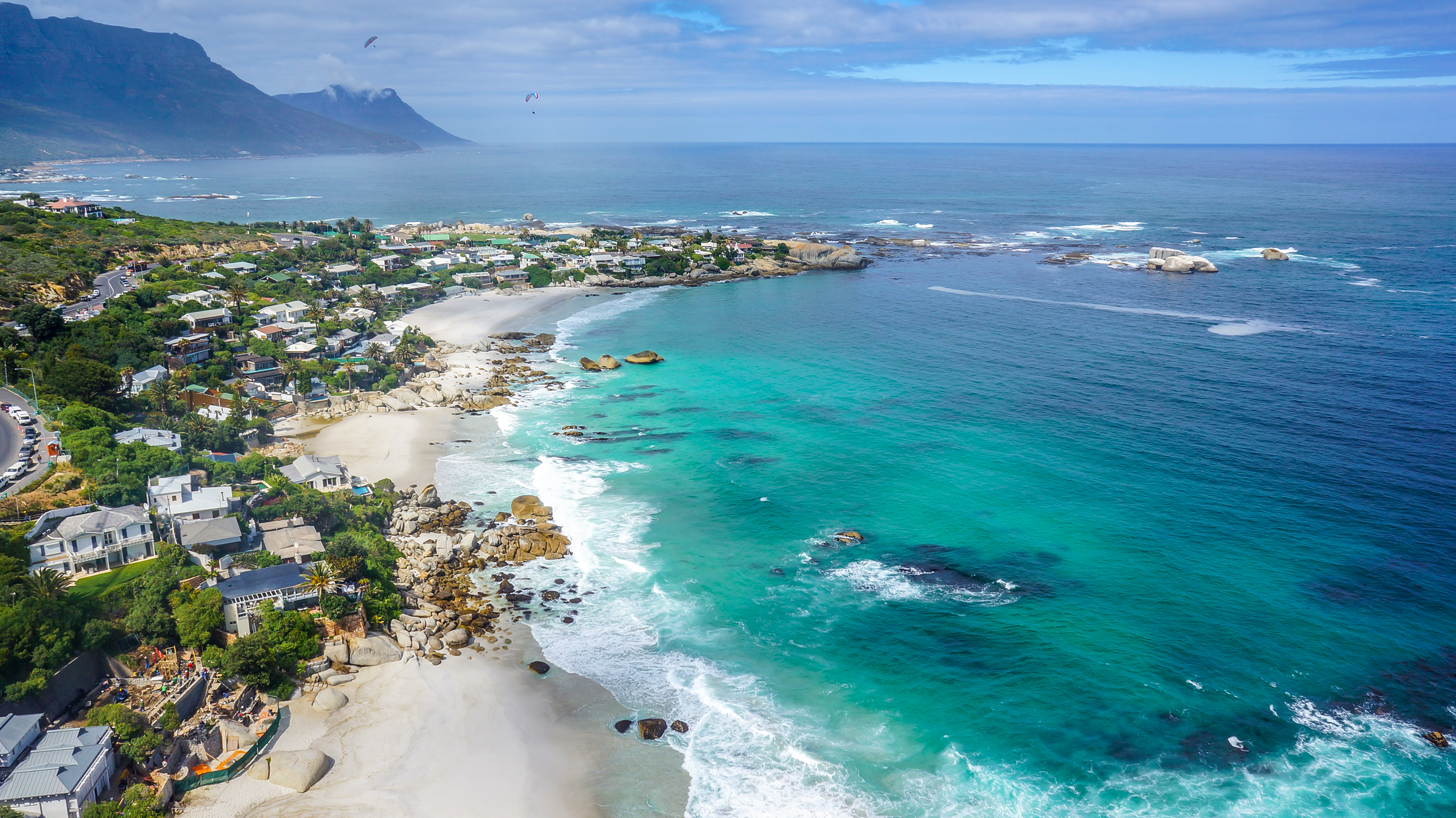
Beaches in Clifton

Along the Atlantic Seaboard, beaches extend from Three Anchor Bay through Clifton and Camps Bay to Llandudno. Clifton's First, Second, Third and Fourth beaches, as well as Camps Bay Beach, attract residents and tourists.

The Atlantic Seaboard region is also home to many recreational, entertainment, and tourist sites, including the Cape Town Stadium, Green Point Athletic Stadium, Green Point Park, and Metropolitan Golf Club in Green Point; many restaurants and cafes along Beach Road in Sea Point and Clifton; and numerous hiking trails that begin above Camps Bay.

The Sea Point Promenade is a 7 km-long oceanfront walkway, popular amongst local joggers and dog-walkers. It is lined with dedicated bicycle lanes.

== Property prices ==
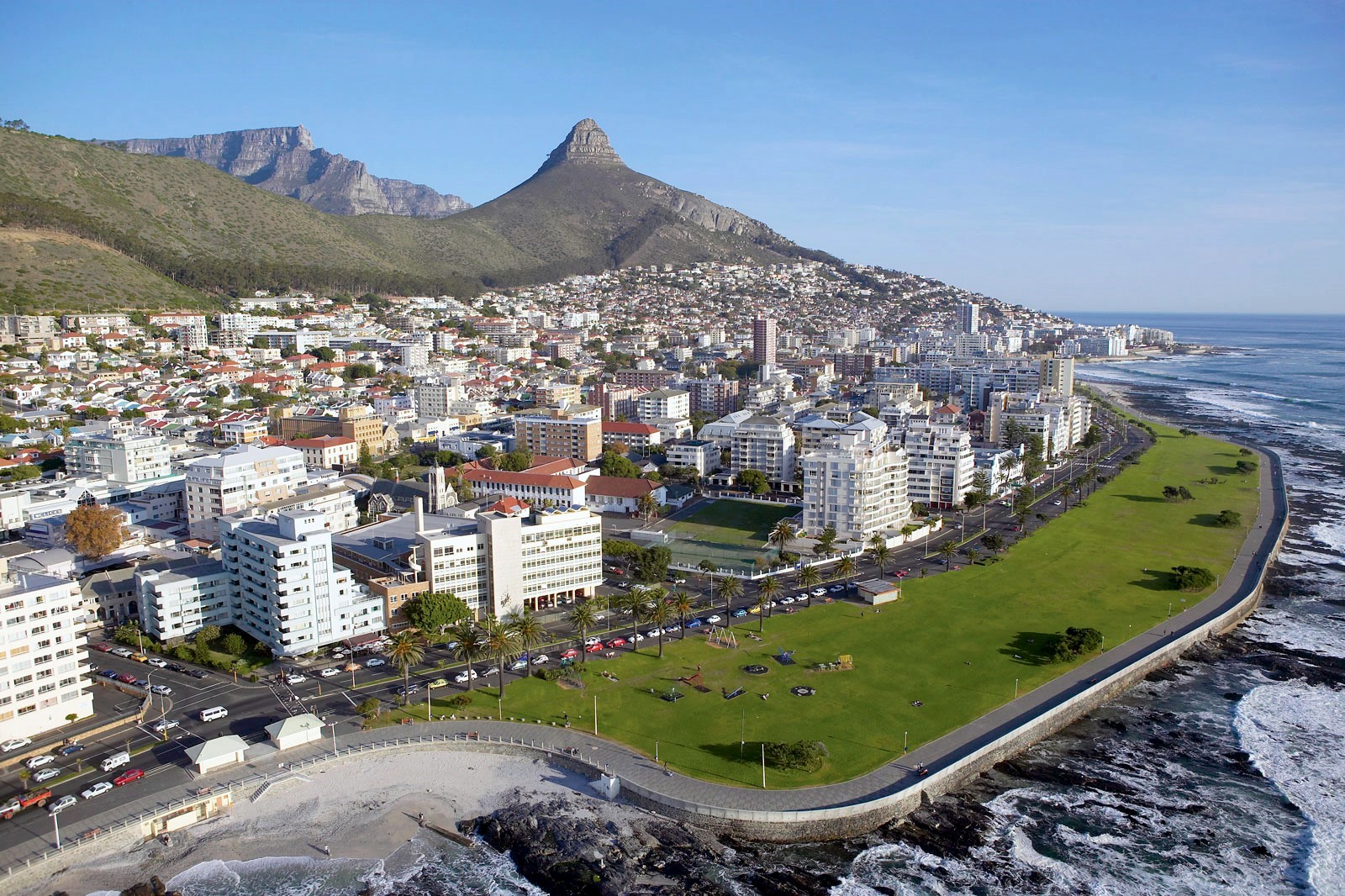
Apartment buildings in Sea Point

The Atlantic Seaboard commands some of the highest property prices in South Africa. With proximity to the CBD, and views across the Atlantic, many houses and apartments in the region fetch prices well above the average in Cape Town, which itself already has an average property price significantly above the South African average.

Sea Point, one of the largest suburbs in the region, houses many high-rise apartment buildings. In contrast, the suburbs of Camps Bay, Clifton, Fresnaye, Llandudno, Bantry Bay, and Bakoven comprise mainly detached houses, many of which are multiple stories tall, and built along the cliffs of the Atlantic coastline.

In 2022, an apartment in Bantry Bay sold for R72 million. In 2025, the Pentagon, a house situated in a prestigious road in Clifton, set a record for the entire country for that year, selling for R157 million.

In a single month in 2025, the average price of the 329 apartments sold in the Atlantic Seaboard was R7.2 million, an increase of 14.2% from the year before. At the same time, there had been a 30% year-over-year increase in the number of apartments in the region selling for over R20 million, and only 7.7% of sales taking place were below R2 million.

In October 2025, the cheapest detached house for sale in the Atlantic Seaboard was R8 million (for a home in Sea Point), while the most expensive, aside from those listed as price on application, was R160 million (for a home in Fresnaye).

In November 2025, a 1,124 m² empty plot of land in Clifton sold for R200 million. The plot is one of the most expensive properties in the Atlantic Seaboard. Despite not having a house on it, the land still ranked as the most expensive residential property for sale in South Africa at the time.

While there are some commercially-zoned properties in the Atlantic Seaboard, especially in Sea Point and Green Point, most property is residential in nature. Homes are popular amongst Capetonians, semigrants (those moving from other cities in South Africa), as well as foreign buyers. Some are rented to those visiting Cape Town on holiday.

== See also ==
- Cape Town
- List of Cape Town suburbs
- Housing in South Africa
