= Clifton, Cape Town =

Clifton
- Suburb of Cape Town
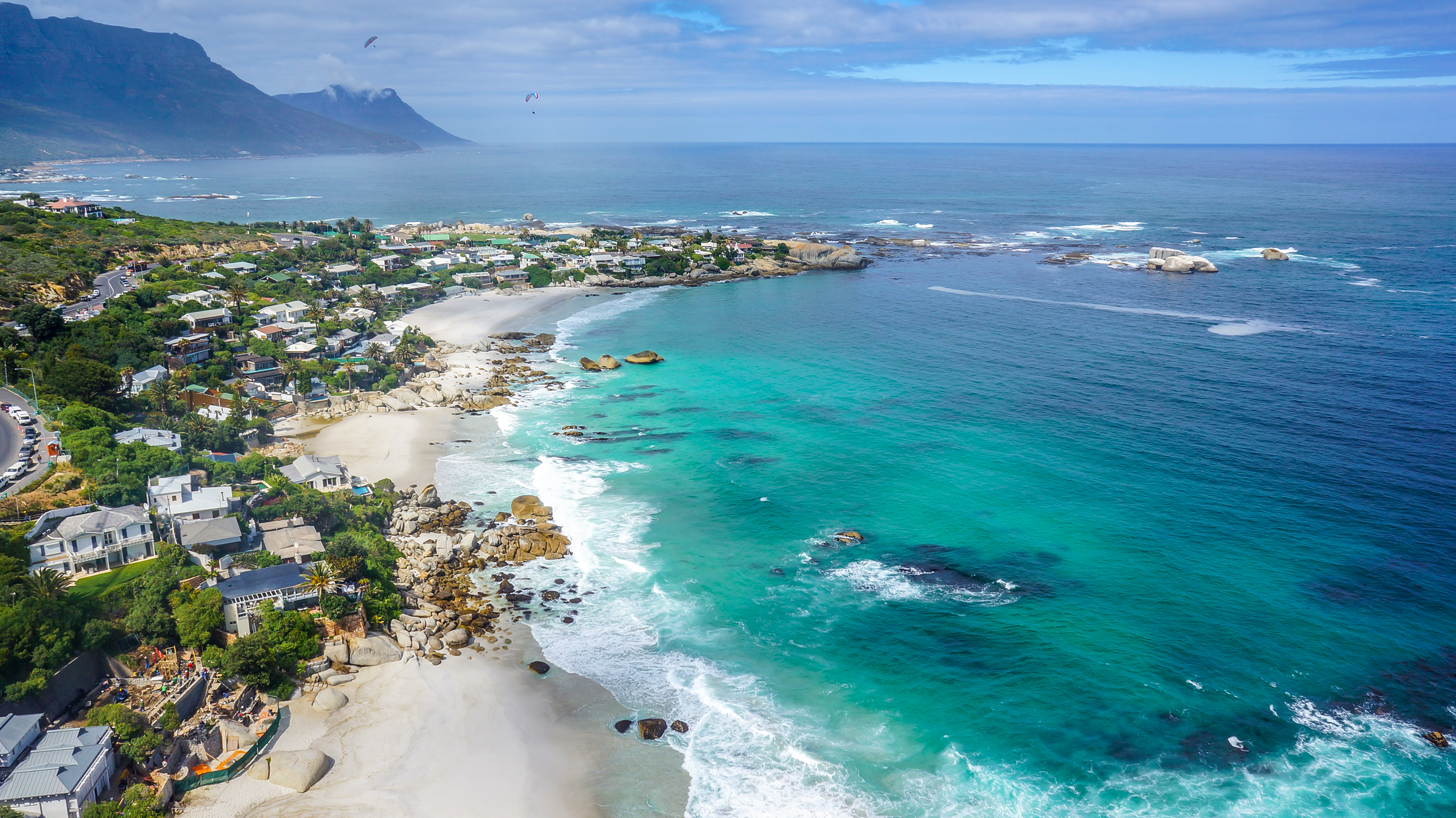
- An aerial view of Clifton 4th (furthest out), 3rd, and 2nd beaches (closest to the foreground).
- Interactive map of Clifton
- Coordinates: 33°56′24″S 18°22′33″E
- Country: South Africa
- Province: Western Cape
- Municipality: City of Cape Town
- Main Place: Cape Town

Government
  - Type: Ward 54
  - Councillor: Nicola Jowell (DA)

Area
  - Total: 0.61 km^{2} (0.24 sq mi)

Population (2011)
  - Total: 507
  - Density: 830/km^{2} (2,200/sq mi)

Racial makeup (2011)
  - Black African: 9.6%
  - Coloured: 8.1%
  - Indian/Asian: 2.2%
  - White: 78.0%
  - Other: 2.2%

First languages (2011)
  - English: 72.0%
  - Afrikaans: 15.4%
  - Xhosa: 3.2%
  - Sotho: 1.2%
  - Other: 8.3%
- Time zone: UTC+2 (SAST)
- Postal code (street): 8005
- Area code: 021

Clifton is an affluent suburb of Cape Town, South Africa. Located in the Atlantic Seaboard, it is an exclusive residential area, and is home to the most expensive real estate in Africa, with dwellings nestled on cliffs that have sweeping views of the Atlantic Ocean.

Clifton was rated as one of the Top Ten Beaches by the cable and satellite television network Discovery Travel Channel in 2003 and 2004 and has received Blue Flag status. In 2005 and 2006 it was rated by Forbes at number 8 in the Top 10 Topless beaches in the World. Clifton is neighbored by the suburbs of Camps Bay and Bantry Bay.

== Tourism ==
Lion's head from Clifton 4th Beach

The area has a set of 4 beaches which are frequently used destinations for both locals and tourists. The beaches, which are named from 1st to 4th from north to south, are separated by groups of granite corestone boulders and have almost pure white quartzite sand. The four beaches of Clifton are one of the few coastal areas of Cape Town well protected from the notorious south-easterly wind, which has a great deal to do with its popularity with bathers. A fifth beach, before First Beach, called Moses Beach (so-called because of the papyrus plants that grow along it), appears and disappears as the sand is washed in and out with the seasons. The water, although chilly (12–16 °C), is used for many watersports, mostly surfing, both board and body. The strongest surf is at First, diminishing to Fourth, where it is the weakest. Fourth beach (to the South), is the most populated and glamorous venue; attracting families. Yachts anchor off Fourth beach, especially on summer weekends. Third beach, the smallest beach, is known as a venue for gay culture. Second beach is populated by students playing beach volleyball and beach bats. First beach, to the north, draws a mixed crowd of locals and surfers. Clifton Beach was noted as one of Discovery's best beaches by region.

Clifton's 4th beach has also been awarded the Blue Flag award in recognition of its environmental, safety and tourist standards.

The small size of the properties on which bungalows are built between Fourth and Second beaches is attributable to the fact that the area was laid out by the City of Cape Town for returning soldiers who had fought in World War I. The original bungalows, now all but replaced by new structures, were built from the packing cases that conveyed imported motor cars during the 1920s and 30s. Narrow flights of stairs run between Victoria Road and the various beaches. These houses now fetch very high prices, despite being only accessible by stairs, and, in most cases, having no garaging.

== Geography and climate ==
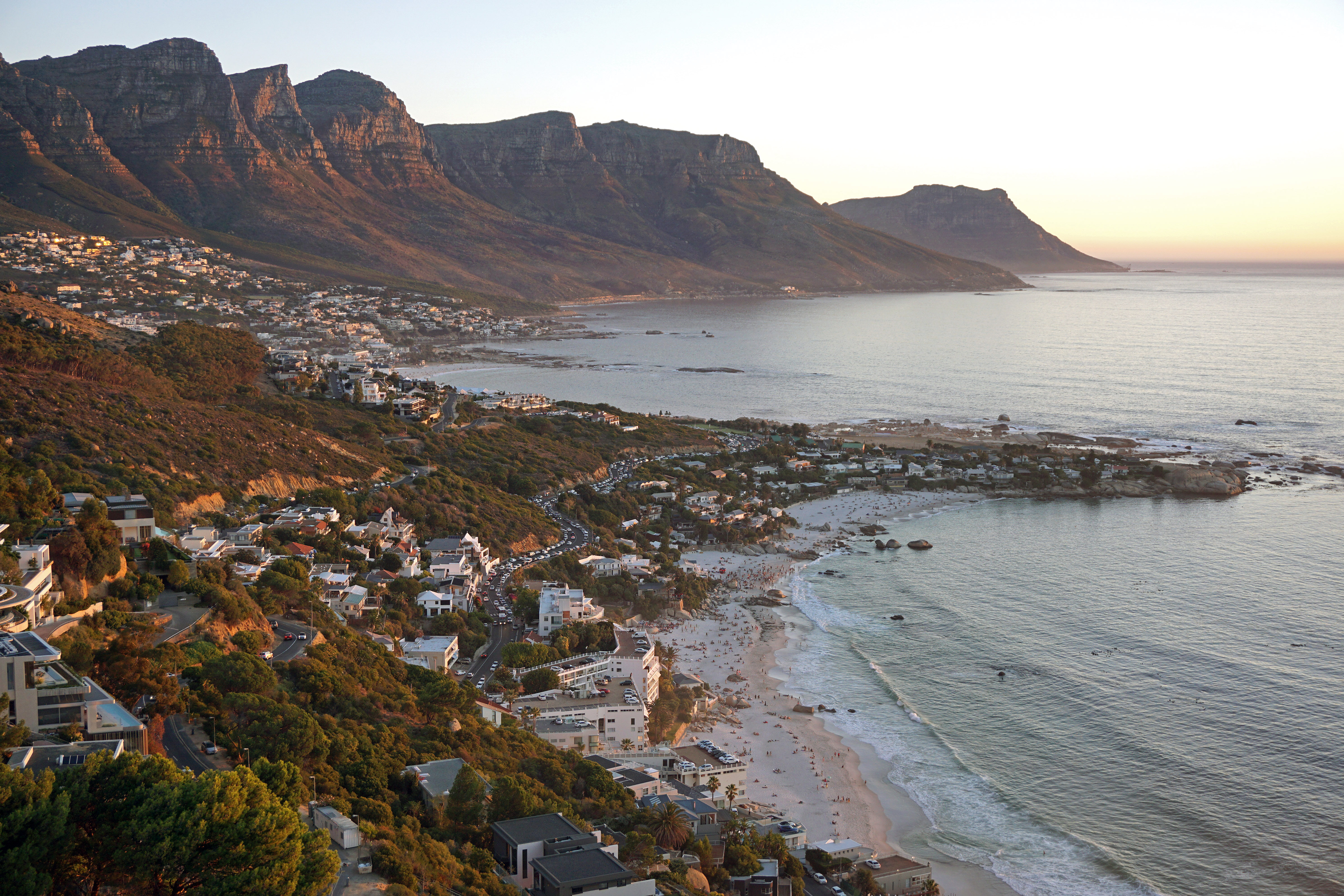
Clifton seen from the Rocks during a sunset.

An interesting feature of Clifton's 4 beaches involves the water temperatures and annual denudation and re-deposit of the bay's sugar-white sands, although for the most part protected in the 'wind shadow' of Lion's Head mountain that stands behind Clifton (on its eastern side).

The strong prevailing south-east wind of summer (October to April), moves the warmer top layer of water offshore – with the result that a compensating upwelling of cold water is set up along the coast. This tends to make water temperatures in summer dip to their lowest levels – sometimes below 10 °C. It also has the effect of re-depositing sand (stripped in winter) onto the beaches, so that by late summer, Clifton's beaches are at their widest, allowing for easy pedestrian movement along the waterline, from beach to beach.

By contrast, winter's north-west gales produce wind waves bringing a net inflow of surface-water into the bay, setting up a compensating outflow of water along the bottom. This water movement tends to cause the bay (and most of the adjacent Atlantic Seaboard) to retain relatively warm Atlantic surface water (10 - 20 °C) during winter – but also strips the sand from the beaches, causing temporary beach erosion that exposes the granite boulder headlands that define the beaches. This peculiarity often startles those unaccustomed to the regular cycle; during these periods, city officials have been known to petition to have sand dumped on the Clifton shore to rectify what they perceive as a defect. But, each summer, Clifton repairs itself with new sand.

== Shark attacks ==
Clifton has had just two separate shark attacks. In 1942, Johan Christian Bergh was attacked by a shark 30 meters off the 4th beach. Bergh's body was never recovered. Witnesses report seeing a 6-meter great white shark swim along the surf's backline and take Mr. Bergh in two rapid attacks. The attacks were so swift that Bergh did not have a chance to emit a sound – consequently, few witnessed the event.

On Saturday 27 November 1976, Jeff Spence, an 18-year-old submariner in the S.A. Navy was attacked by a 3.5 meter great white while treading water 100 meters from 4th beach. Spence suffered significant trauma to the left side of his torso – with deep punctures and gouges back and front. Being an extremely hot day, no fewer than 6 doctors were on the beach at that time, and, together with the efforts of volunteer lifesavers from Clifton Lifesaving Club, Spence survived and was airlifted to hospital where he made a full recovery.

The attacks notwithstanding, shark sightings are extremely rare in Clifton and on the Atlantic coast in general. Most supposed sightings turn out to be seals or sunfish.

== Controversy ==
During the time of apartheid, the suburb and the beach was a racially demarcated area to only white people until early 1990s.

== History ==
Clifton was originally called Skoenmakers Gat (Cobbler's Cave) after a ship deserter who lived in a cave above second beach.

In 1794 the slave ship, São José Paquete Africa, a Portuguese slaver carrying 400 slaves from Mozambique to Brazil ran aground. Two hundred lost their lives in the wreck and the surviving 200 were sold the following day in the town.

== Notable people ==
- Jani Allan, columnist
- Christo Wiese, businessman
- Errol Arendz, fashion designer
- Adrian Gore, founder of Discovery
- Allen Ambor, founder of Spur
- Gerrit Ferreira, founder of FirstRand

== Culture ==
A novel, The Praying Nun, is set in Clifton bay. It details the original 1980s discovery of the José Paquete Africa and dramatizes the sinking event with historical accuracy.
