= Fresnaye =

- Suburb of Cape Town
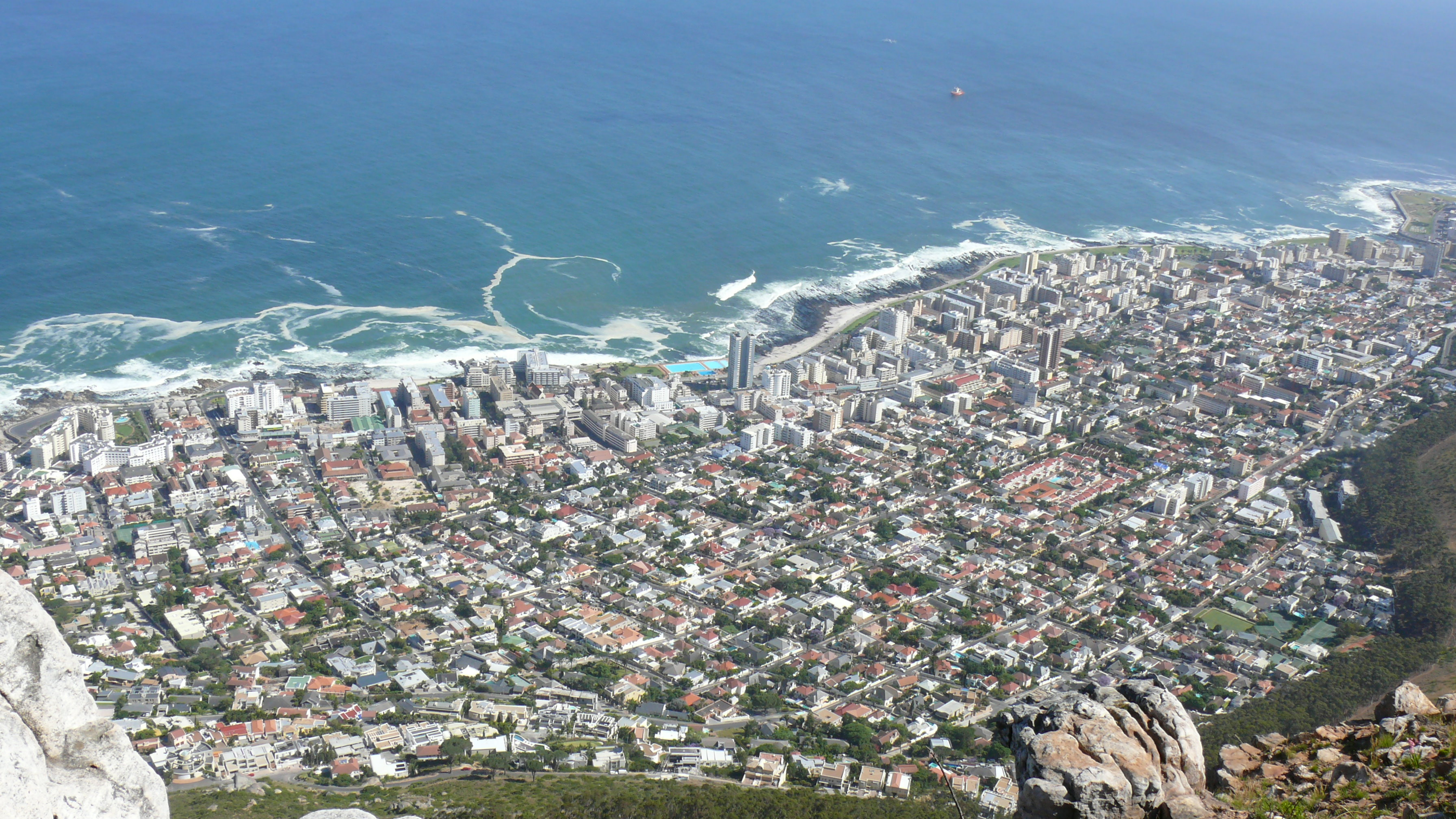
- Fresnaye and Sea Point as seen from Lion's Head which surrounds the suburb on the East. Sea Point is to the North and the West separating the suburb from the Atlantic Ocean.
- Interactive map of Fresnaye
- Coordinates: 33°55′30″S 18°23′15″E
- Country: South Africa
- Province: Western Cape
- Municipality: City of Cape Town
- Main Place: Cape Town

Government
  - Type: Metropolitan Council; Ward 54
  - Councillor: Nicola Jowell (DA)

Area
  - Total: 0.73 km^{2} (0.28 sq mi)

Population (2011)
  - Total: 2,011
  - Density: 2,800/km^{2} (7,100/sq mi)

Racial makeup (2011)
  - Black African: 9.5%
  - Coloured: 4.0%
  - Indian/Asian: 0.8%
  - White: 83.1%
  - Other: 2.6%

First languages (2011)
  - English: 81.2%
  - Afrikaans: 9.8%
  - Xhosa: 1.8%
  - Other: 7.3%
- Time zone: UTC+2 (SAST)
- Postal code (street): 8005
- Area code: 021

Fresnaye is one of Cape Town's most affluent suburbs, situated in the city's Atlantic Seaboard region, between Signal Hill and Sea Point, and a few kilometres west of Cape Town CBD.

== History ==
Fresnaye was originally an estate of 200 acres (81 ha), acquired in the early 1800s, and belonging to Ryk Le Sueur, a barrister, and French aristocrat from Bayeux in Normandy and descendant of the French Huguenots. The original name was Winterslust, and the farmhouse was at that time, the only building on the mountain slopes, other than Heeren Huis near Bantry Bay, built in 1776. Fresnaye was set in vineyards and orchards, and referred to as "A Garden of Eden" at the time.

The suburbs street names reflect its French heritage to this day.

The ratepayers, residents and local businesses in the area are represented by the Sea Point, Fresnaye & Bantry Bay Ratepayers and Residents Association (SFB), a volunteer-led organization financed by donations and memberships. The SFB's mandate includes defending the heritage of the area, construction applications, providing added security and cleansing above what is provided by the City and State, and communications with residents and ratepayers, as well as on behalf of these parties with stakeholders such as the City of Cape Town.

== Geography ==
Fresnaye is set on the slopes of Lion's Head on the East and between Sea Point and Bantry Bay to the suburb's North West and South West respectively.

== Notable people ==
- F. W. de Klerk (1936–2021), state president of South Africa from 1989 to 1994
- Abe Bloomberg (1904–1990), Mayor of Cape Town from 1945 to 1947
- David Bloomberg (1932–2020), son of Abe and also Mayor of Cape Town from 1973 to 1975
