= Camps Bay =

Suburb of Cape Town, Western Cape, South Africa

Camps Bay Kampsbaai
- Suburb of Cape Town
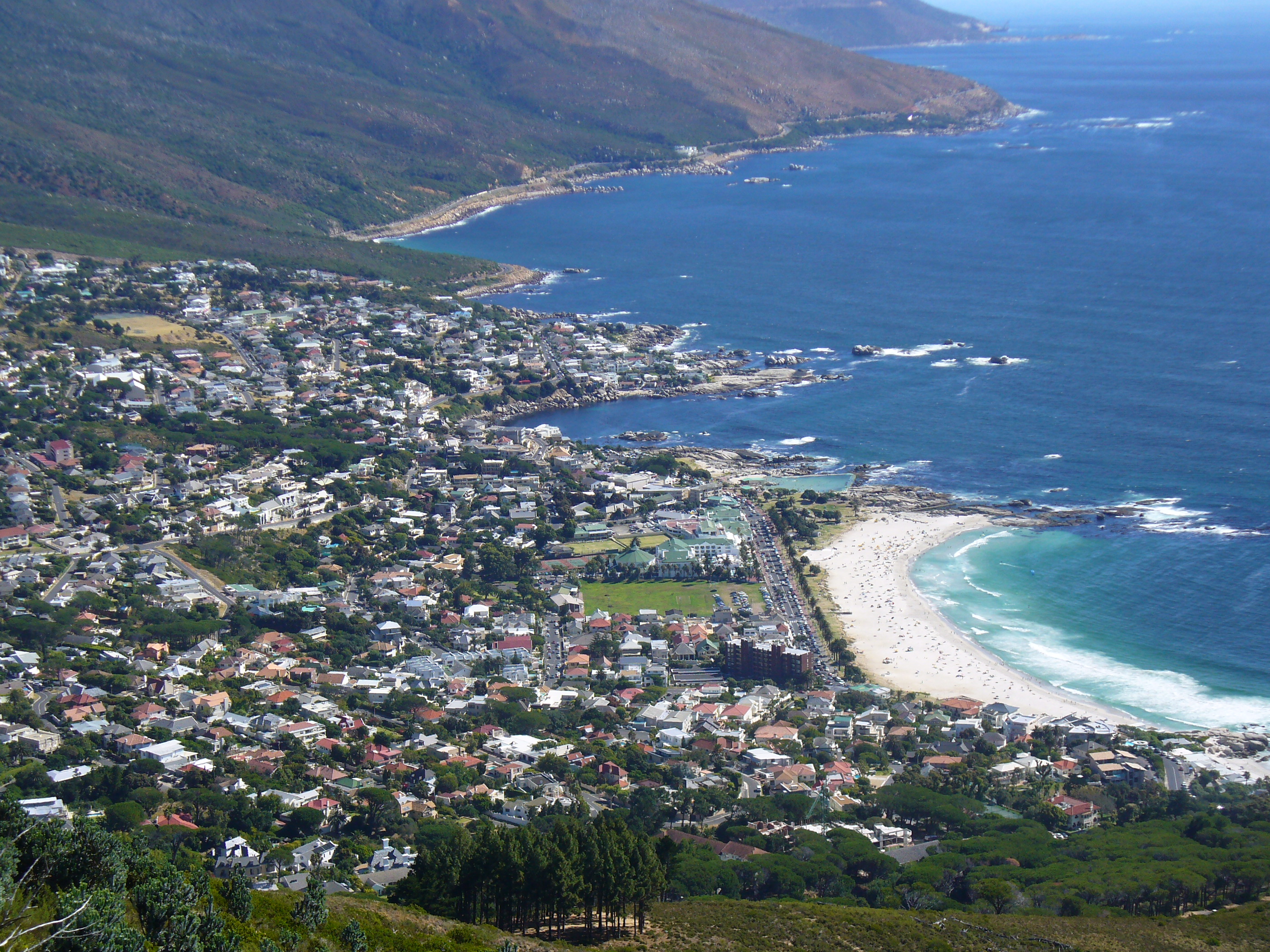
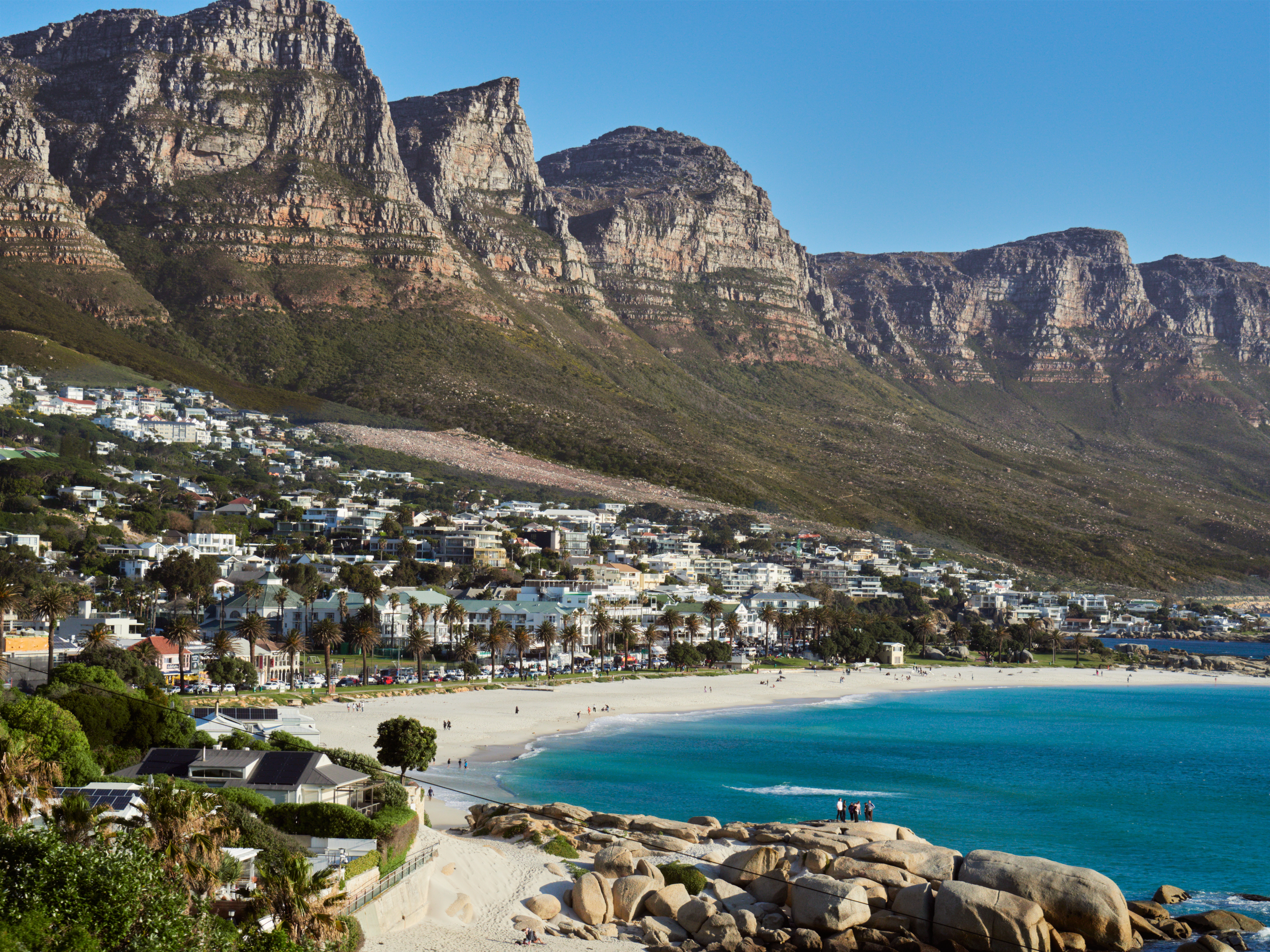
- Top: View of Camps Bay from Lion's Head; Bottom: Camps Bay from the beach
- Interactive map of Camps Bay
- Coordinates: 33°57′00″S 18°23′00″E
- Country: South Africa
- Province: Western Cape
- District: Atlantic Seaboard
- Municipality: City of Cape Town
- Main Place: Cape Town

Area
  - Total: 1.68 km^{2} (0.65 sq mi)

Population (2011)
  - Total: 2,773
  - Density: 1,650/km^{2} (4,280/sq mi)

Racial makeup (2011)
  - Black African: 13.5%
  - Coloured: 5.1%
  - Indian/Asian: 1.7%
  - White: 78.3%
  - Other: 1.4%

First languages (2011)
  - English: 79.4%
  - Afrikaans: 9.4%
  - Xhosa: 2.1%
  - Other: 9.0%
- Time zone: UTC+2 (SAST)
- Postal code (street): 8005
- PO box: 8040
- Area code: 021

Camps Bay (Afrikaans: Kampsbaai) is an affluent suburb of Cape Town, South Africa. It is also the small bay on the west coast of the Cape Peninsula, after which the suburb is named.

The neighborhood is one of 10 that together form the city's Atlantic Seaboard. In summer, Camps Bay's beaches and restaurants attract many locals, as well as foreign visitors. Camps Bay, and surrounding suburbs, have some of South Africa's most expensive real estate.

== History ==
The first recorded residents of Camps Bay were San hunter gatherers and Goringhaikona Khoi pastoralists. When Jan van Riebeek established a refreshment station for the VOC (Dutch East India Company) in 1654, the Twelve Apostles were covered in forests with lions, leopards and antelopes.

In competition with Dutch settlers, the Goringhaikona lost their grazing lands on the southeastern slopes of Table Mountain, and in 1657 they were restricted to Camps Bay.

By 1713 the Goringhaikona population had been reduced by measles and smallpox. All that was left of their settlement was an old kraal (Oudekraal).

The area was then granted to John Lodewyk Wernich and passed from father to son. Johan Wernich married Anna Koekemoer, who on his death in 1778, married Fredrick Ernst von Kamptz, a sailor and the area became known as “Die Baai van von Kamptz”.

For most of the 1800s Camps Bay was undeveloped. Lord Charles Somerset used the area for hunting and used the Roundhouse as his lodge. Kloof Nek Road was built in 1848 and in 1884 Thomas Bain was commissioned to build a road from Sea Point to Camps Bay using convict labour.

The road was completed in 1887 and named Victoria road to honour Queen Victoria’s jubilee in 1888. The road allowed people to cycle out to Camps Bay which had gained popularity as a picnic site. This led to the development, in 1901 of the Camps Bay tramway to bring people out for the day and with it the development of the tidal pools, the Rotunda (now the Bay Hotel) and a pavilion for concerts and shows.

In April 1853, the famous Russian novelist Ivan Goncharov (1812–1891), then on a voyage from Kronstadt in Russia to Japan and Siberia, in the course of which he spent almost a month at the Cape, took a drive around Lion's Head with several fellow Russian travelers. On the mountain slope, they encountered a "wooden edifice like a pavilion, hardly visible in the thick greenery," which their driver told them was "The restaurant Rotonda . . . excursionists come here for rest and refreshment."

"A buxom Dutchwoman brought us lemonade and wine," Goncharov writes. "We lighted cigars and became absorbed in gazing . . . at the wide vista lying before us." The Rotunda restaurant built in 1905 was thus not the first of that name in Camps Bay. There had been a Rotunda restaurant there over half a century earlier, although presumably not on the same site.

In 1913, Camps Bay was incorporated into the City of Cape Town.

== Beaches ==
Oudekraal is made up of a collection of tiny beaches sheltered amongst the boulders and a well established picnic area with lawns, braais, covered seating areas with tables, benches and public toilets.

Lui Bay (also known as Witsand) is a popular dive site. In 1977 two scrap vessels, the Antipolis and Romelia, were being towed around the Cape when their tow line broke in a storm. This caused the Antipolis to run aground near Oudekraal, while the Romelia ran aground further south on Sunset Rocks at Llandudno. The wreck of the Antipolis was cut down to about low water level, but part of the hull was cast up on the beach by a storm,

Koeël Bay has an African open-air curio market that sells hand crafted items from all over Africa.

Bakoven gets its name because of a large rock just off-shore with what appears as an oven door in its side. There are several sheltered coves located in Bakoven. There is a sea rescue base stationed here and a popular swimming beach is off Beta Close. In the 1940s a row of beach front houses were erected to house honored members of the South African Army who fought during World War II. Many of these old houses still stand and are now registered as South African National Heritage Sites.

Balie Bay, from the Afrikaans kak balie (shit barrel) after the sewer discharge that used to be there.

Camps Bay Beach, a Blue Flag Beach since 2008, is the largest white sand beach in Camps Bay. There is a seasonal life guard station with toilets at the west end of the beach. The beach is opposite Camps Bay's main tourist hub, featuring multiple hotels, restaurants, and shops.

Glen Beach, at the far right of Camps Bay beach, is known as Camps Bay's best surfing beach.

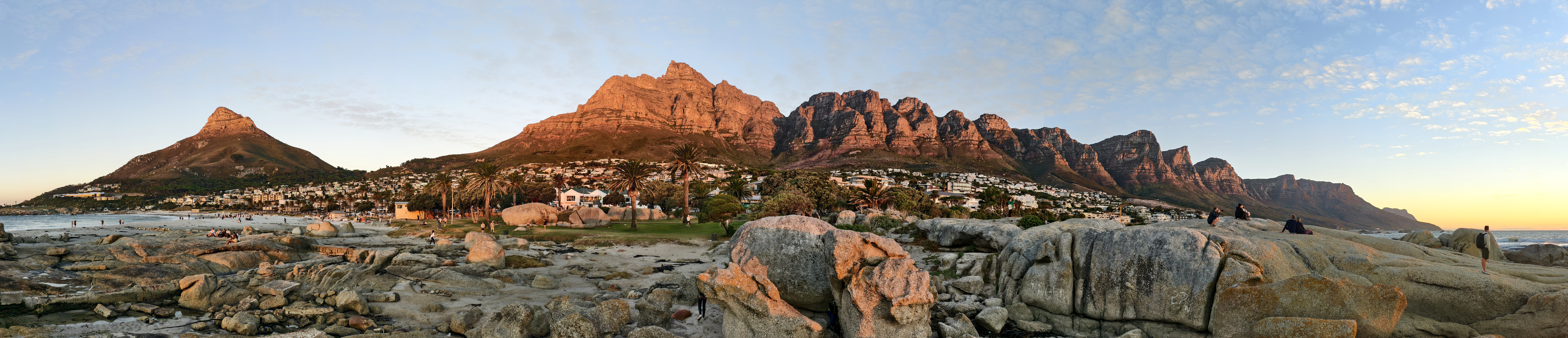
Camps Bay – Cape Town suburbs, beach and Lion's Head peak with Twelve Apostles mountain range.
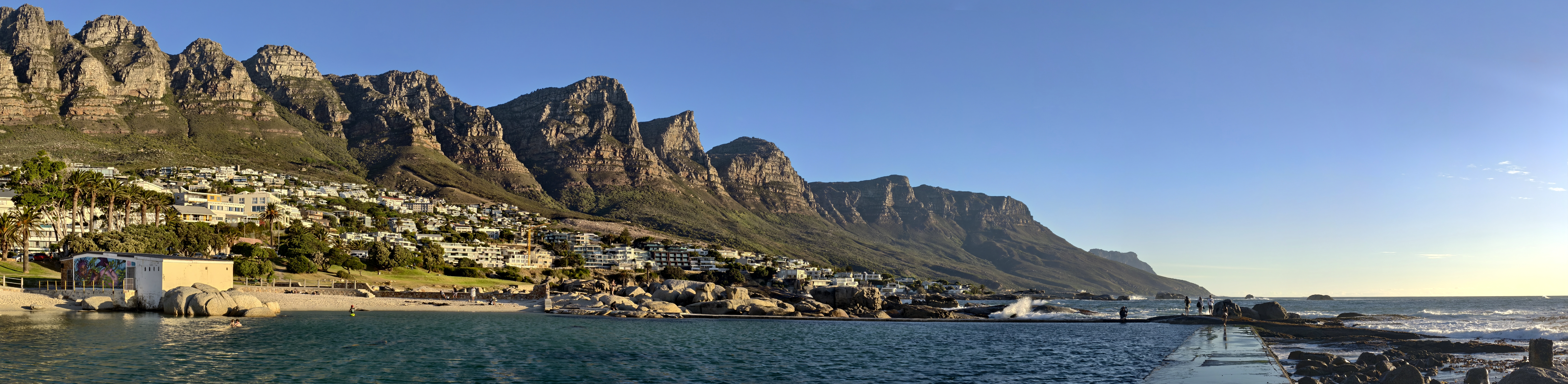
Camps Bay Tidal Pool in the foreground, with the Twelve Apostles mountain range behind

== Housing ==
Camps Bay is home to some of South Africa's most expensive real estate. The suburb features a mix of luxury apartments and detached houses.

As of August 2026, the average price of a 2-bedroom condo in Camps Bay was R11.33 million, and the average for a 3-bedroom condo was R23.1 million, with the average for all condo sizes being R18.74 million.

Detached houses in the suburb are on the larger end, and generally range from 3 to 5 bedrooms, located on plots around 800 to 1,000 sqm. The average price of a detached Camps Bay house in August 2026 was R31.93 million. The most expensive home on sale in Camps Bay that month was priced at R110 million.

== Transit ==
Camps Bay is served by two major roads in the region. The first is Victoria Road, which runs along the coast, connecting Camps Bay to Clifton and Sea Point to the north, and Llandudno to the south. The second is Camps Bay Drive, which runs along the top of the suburb, and connects it with Higgovale and Gardens, on the other side of Table Mountain. Camps Bay Drive turns into Kloof Nek Road after passing through a valley in the mountain.

The suburb is served by the MyCiTi BRT system, via the Camps Bay–Civic Centre route (Routes 106 and 107). While there are no stations in the neighborhood, there are numerous stops along Victoria Road.

== Commerce ==
The suburb is primarily residential, however there are a multitude of restaurants and cafes on the coast, along Victoria Road. There are also many different small hotels throughout the neighborhood.

Stores are centered around the southern side of Camps Bay beach, with most being located in Promenade Mall.

== In popular culture ==
- Camps Bay was used as the scene of the virtual 'perfect' town of San Junipero in the episode of the same name, in season 3 of Black Mirror.
- Apple Watch's Series 4 advertisement features multiple parts of Cape Town including Camps Bay.
- Camps Bay was the home of the worldwide Television series SAF3, starring Dolph Lundgren. The series was created by Gregory J. Bonann, the creator of the series Baywatch. SAF3's set was on the suburb's main beach, and the beaches of Camps Bay were the backdrop of all 20 episodes.

== Notable residents ==
Numerous notable individuals have resided in Camps Bay over the suburb's history. These include:

Notable people
- Anthony Oliphant (17 November 1793 – 9 March 1859), attorney general and King's Advocate in the Vice-Admiralty Court from 1827 to circa. 1838.
- Anton Fig (born 8 August 1952), session drummer.
- Audrey Blignault (6 July 1916 – 1 October 2008), author.
- Ben Dekker (born 1940), was briefly superintendent at Stans Halt Youth Hostel in the Big Glen.
- Ben Turok (26 June 1927 – 9 December 2019), former anti-apartheid activist, economics professor and former MP.
- David Kramer (born 27 June 1951), singer, songwriter, playwright and director, born in Worcester now lives in Camps Bay.
- Dean Furman (born 1988), professional footballer.
- Elsie Garrett Rice (25 November 1869 – 27 April 1959), botanical artist.
- Gonda Betrix (born 1943), Springbok equestrian.
- Grant Haskin (born 1968), Cape Town City Councillor and previously Deputy Mayor of Cape Town.
- Herschelle Gibbs (born 23 February 1974), cricketer.
- James Small (10 February 1969 – 10 July 2019), Springbok rugby player.
- Jannie Engelbrecht (born 10 November 1938), Springbok rugby player, from Stellenbosch but lived in Camps Bay.
- John Whitmore (30 March 1929 – 24 December 2001), pioneered the sport of surfing in South Africa.
- Jordy Smith (born 11 February 1988), professional surfer.
- Kyle Brown (born 6 February 1987), rugby union player.
- Lewis Pugh (born 5 December 1969), endurance swimmer and ocean advocate.
- Lord Charles Somerset (12 December 1767 – 18 February 1831), governor of the Cape Colony from 1814 to 1826.
- Lyndall Jarvis, model and television presenter.
- Mary Renault (4 September 1905 – 13 December 1983), writer.
- Nigel Hawthorne (5 April 1929 – 26 December 2001), actor.
- Paige Nick, novelist, columnist and advertising copywriter.
- Percy Montgomery (born 15 March 1974), retired rugby union player.
- Pieter Toerien (born 1942), producer and theatre manager.
- Simon Thirsk (born 15 May 1977), retired Olympic swimmer.
- Stelio Savante (born 24 April 1970), actor.
- Zainunnisa Gool (6 November 1897 – 1 July 1963), anti-apartheid political and civil rights leader.

== Gallery ==
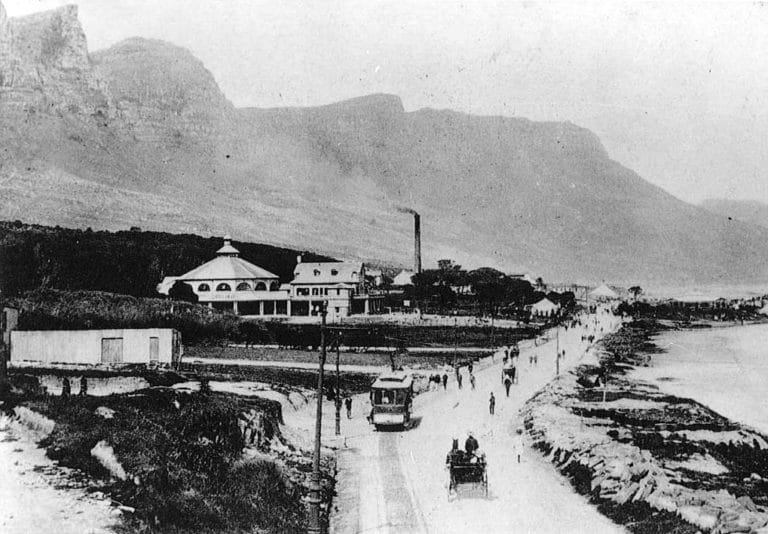
A view of the Rotunda on Victoria road in Camps Bay in 1905. The tramway to Sea Point and Cape Town is visible in the foreground

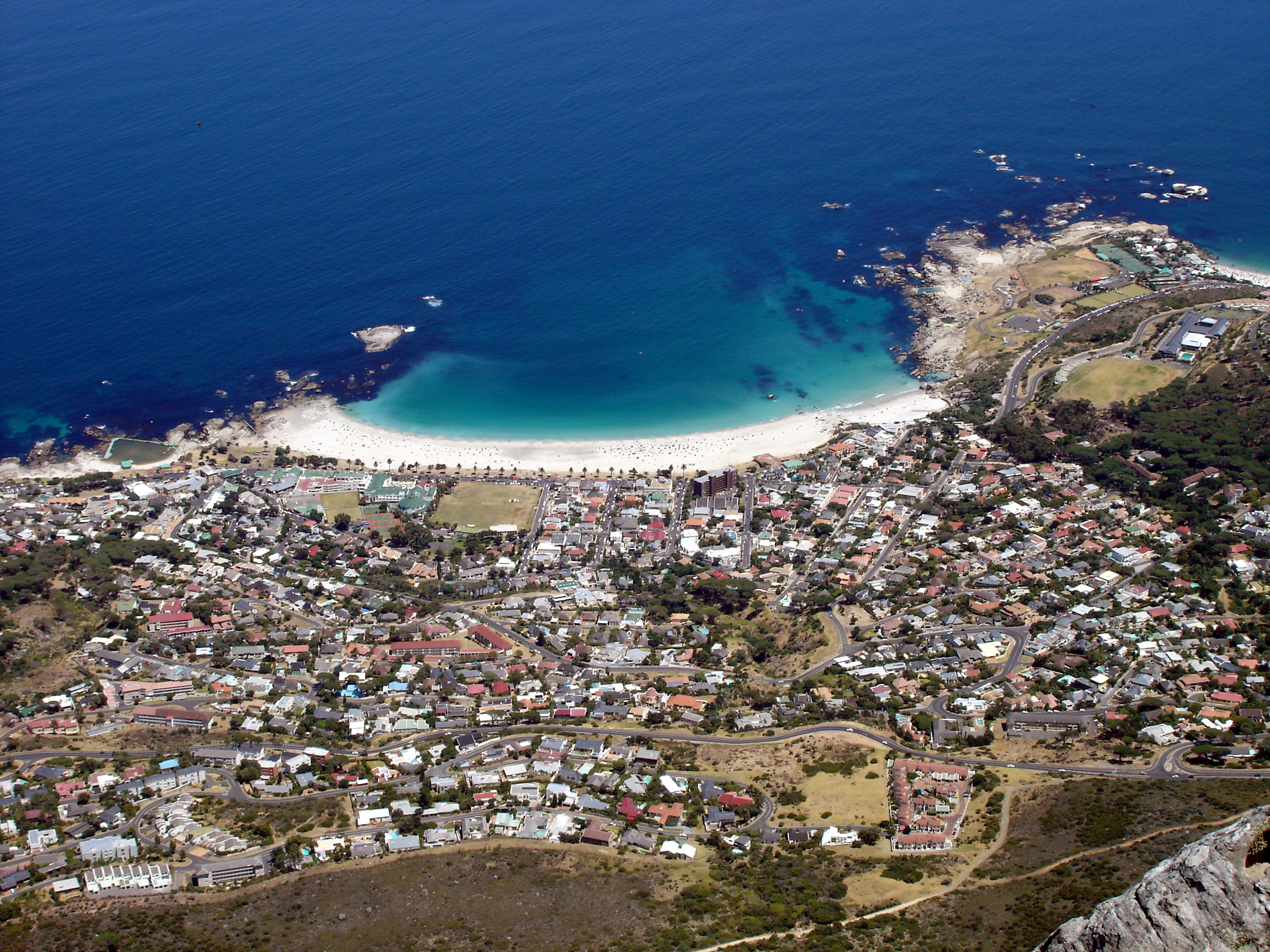
Aerial view of Camps Bay from Table Mountain, in 2005

== See also ==
- Beaches of Cape Town
