= Twelve Apostles (mountains) =

Mountain range on the Cape Peninsula, South Africa

The Twelve Apostles are part of the Table Mountain complex overlooking Camps Bay in Cape Town, South Africa. The mountain range stretches 6 km almost to Hout Bay. They actually consist of eighteen peaks. From north to south they are named Kloof, Fountain, Porcupine, Jubilee, Barrier, Valken, Kasteel, Postern, Wood, Spring, Slangolie, Corridor, Separation, Victoria, Grove, Llandudno Peak, Llandudno Corridor, and Hout Bay Corner. The average height above sea level is 750 m, compared to 1,060 m for Table Mountain. Under the Dutch East India Company, the range was known as the Castle Mountains (Dutch: Kasteelbergen) or Gable Mountains (Dutch: Gevelbergen).

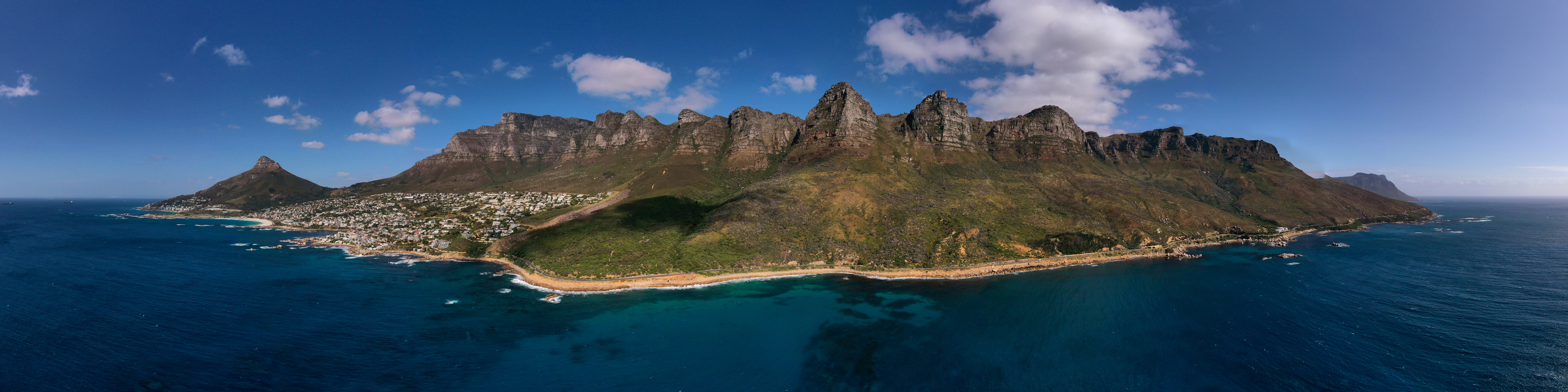
Twelve Apostles panoramic view

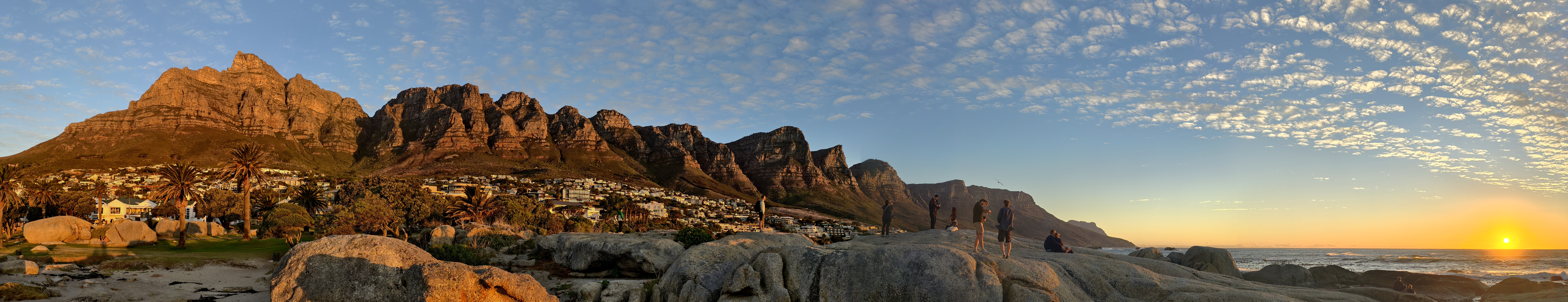
Twelve Apostles mountain range at sunset, Camps Bay, Cape Town, South Africa

== Sources ==
- Rosenthal, Eric, Ensiklopedie van Suidelike Afrika, 1967
