= Blocco Mentale =

- Origin: Viterbo, Italy
- Genres: Progressive rock
- Years active: 1967–present

Blocco Mentale were an Italian progressive rock band. The band, formed in 1972 in Viterbo, only released one album called POA in 1973 and one further single before breaking up.

== Personnel ==
- Bernardo "Dino" Finocchi (vocals, sax, flute)
- Aldo Angeletti (vocals, bass)
- Gigi Bianchi (guitar, vocals)
- Filippo Lazzari (keyboards, vocals, mouth harp)
- Michele Arena (drums, vocals)

== Discography ==
=== Albums ===
- 1973: POA (Titania)

=== Singles ===
- 1973: L'amore muore a vent'anni (West Side)
- 1973: Lei è musica (West Side)
