= Three Anchor Bay =

Three Anchor Bay Drieankerbaai
- Suburb of Cape Town
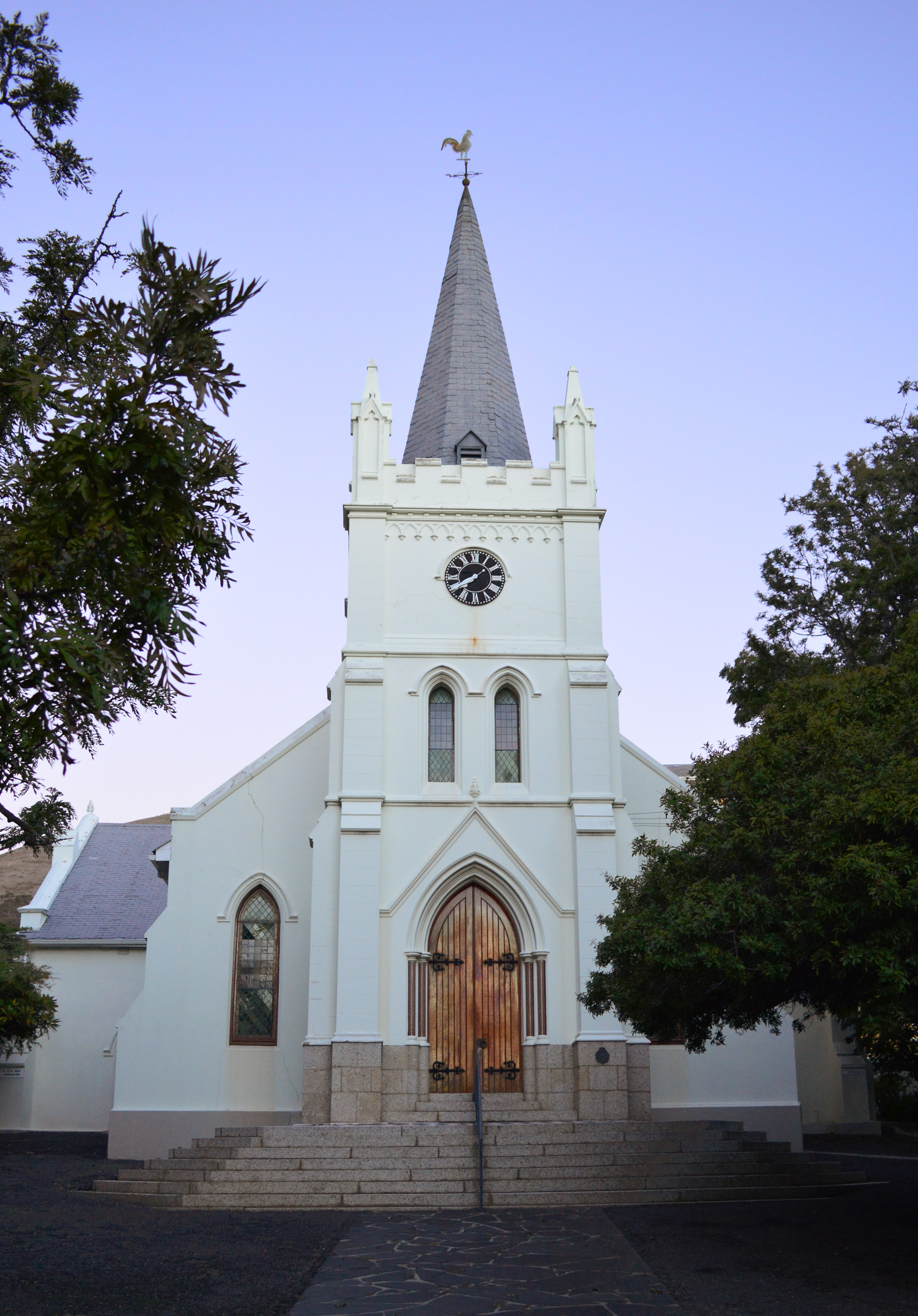
- Dutch Reformed Church in Three Anchor Bay
- Interactive map of Three Anchor Bay
- Coordinates: 33°54′30″S 18°23′45″E
- Country: South Africa
- Province: Western Cape
- Municipality: City of Cape Town
- Main Place: Cape Town

Area
  - Total: 0.29 km^{2} (0.11 sq mi)

Population (2011)
  - Total: 2,225
  - Density: 7,700/km^{2} (20,000/sq mi)

Racial makeup (2011)
  - Black African: 14.9%
  - Coloured: 8.9%
  - Indian/Asian: 3.5%
  - White: 67.8%
  - Other: 5.0%

First languages (2011)
  - English: 67.9%
  - Afrikaans: 16.4%
  - Xhosa: 4.3%
  - Zulu: 1.0%
  - Other: 10.4%
- Time zone: UTC+2 (SAST)
- Postal code (street): 8005
- Area code: 021

Three Anchor Bay is a suburb of Cape Town, in the Western Cape province of South Africa. It is situated in the Atlantic Seaboard region of the city.

The name, first encountered in 1661, possibly refers to anchors securing chains stretched as defence across the bay. The form Drieankerbaai is preferred for official purposes.

Afrikaans language author and poet Ingrid Jonker drowned herself at the nearby beach on July 19, 1965.

The National Sea Rescue Institute is headquartered there.
