= Sarah Lotz =

British novelist

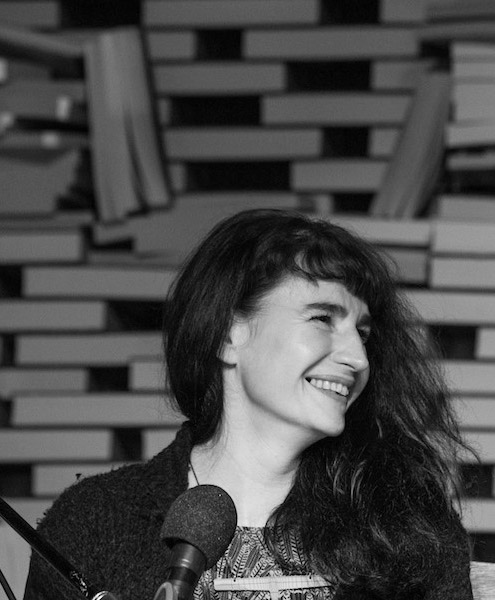
- Sarah Lotz at a talk in 2014
- Born: 1971 (age 54–55); Wolverhampton, United Kingdom
- Education: University of Cape Town
- Occupation: Author
- Website: sarahlotz.com

Sarah Lotz is a British-South African novelist.

== Biography ==
Sarah Lotz was born in Wolverhampton, England. She left home as a teenager and briefly lived in Paris and Israel before settling in South Africa, where she lived for about twenty years, working as a writer and artist. She married but the marriage ended in divorce. She received an honours degree in English at the University of Cape Town. In 2014 she returned to live in the United Kingdom.

Lotz publishes under her own name and a number of pseudonyms. She is, with author Louis Greenberg, the urban horror novelist S. L. Grey, with her daughter Savannah Lotz she is Lily Herne and she is Helena S. Paige when she writes with Helen Moffett and Paige Nick. Lotz is published by Hodder & Stoughton and Little, Brown and Company. She lives in Cape Town and the UK.

== Bibliography ==
=== As herself ===
- The Three (2012)
- Dark Harvest (2014)
- Day Four (2015)
- Pompidou Posse (2015)
- Skin Deep (2016)
- Body in the Woods (2017)
- The White Road (2017)
- Reborn (2018)
- Missing Person (2019)
- Impossible Us (2022)
- How to Kill a Crime Writer (2026)

=== As S. L. Grey (with Louis Greenberg) ===
- The Mall (2011)
- The Ward (2012)
- The New Girl (2013)
- The Ward / The Mall / The New Girl (2015)
- The Apartment (2016)

=== As Lily Herne (with Savannah Lotz) ===
- Deadlands (2012)
- Death of a Saint (2013)
- The Army Of The Lost (2014)
- Ash Remains (2016)

=== As Helena S. Paige (with Helen Moffett and Paige Nick) ===
- A Girl Walks Into a Bar (2013)
- A Girl Walks Into a Wedding (2013)
- A Girl Walks Into a Blind Date (2014)
