= Llandudno, Western Cape =

Seaside town in the Western Cape, South Africa

Llandudno
- Town in the Western Cape
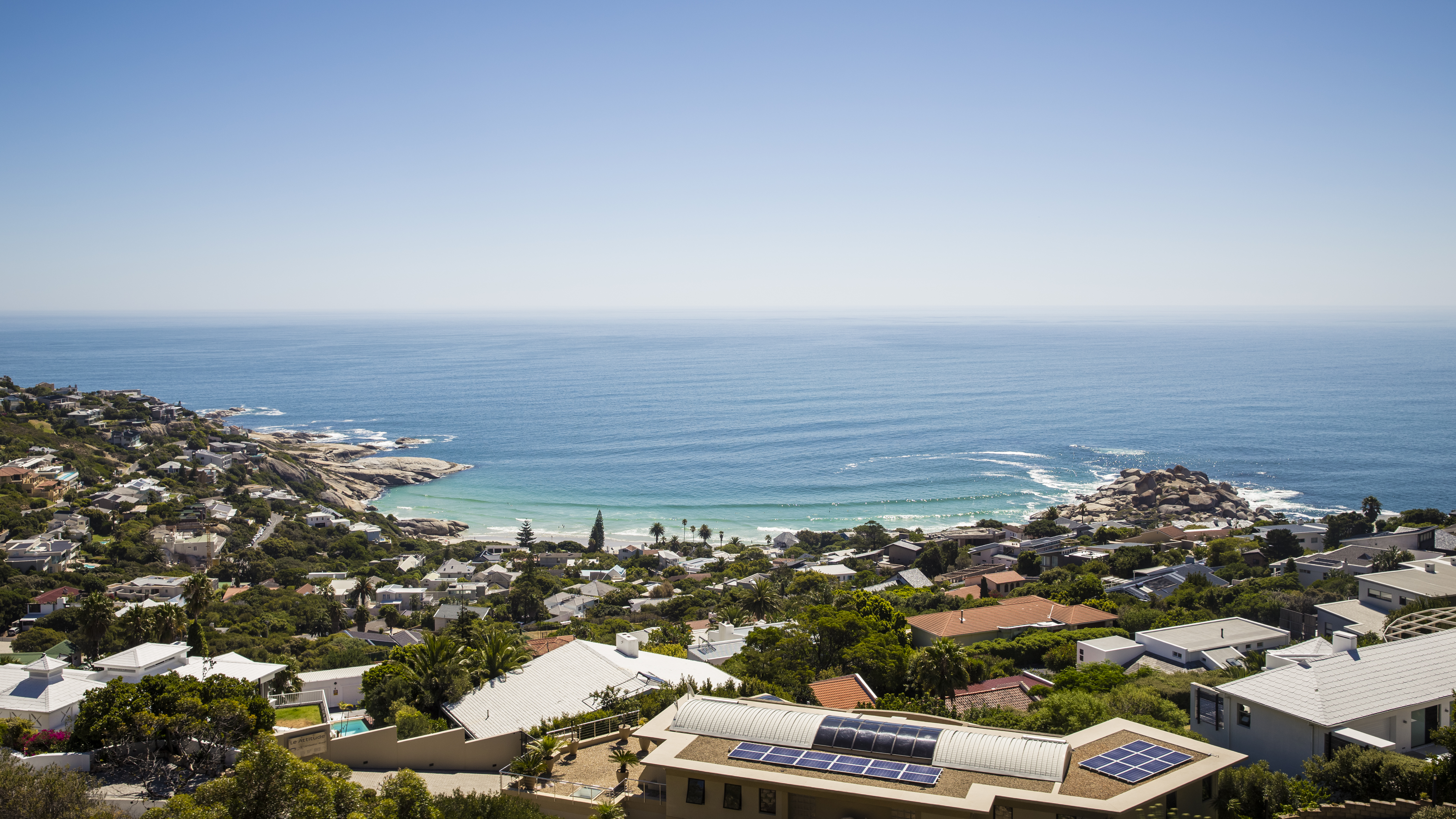
- Llandudno

- Location within Western Cape Location within South Africa
- Coordinates: 34°0′37″S 18°20′34″E
- Country: South Africa
- Province: Western Cape
- Municipality: City of Cape Town
- Main Place: Hout Bay

Area
  - Total: 2.89 km^{2} (1.12 sq mi)

Population (2011)
  - Total: 571
  - Density: 198/km^{2} (512/sq mi)

Racial makeup (2011)
  - Black African: 10.3%
  - Coloured: 2.1%
  - Indian/Asian: 0.2%
  - White: 86.9%
  - Other: 0.5%

First languages (2011)
  - English: 85.5%
  - Afrikaans: 6.0%
  - Xhosa: 3.3%
  - Other: 5.3%
- Time zone: UTC+2 (SAST)
- Postal code (street): n/a
- PO box: 7806
- Area code: 021

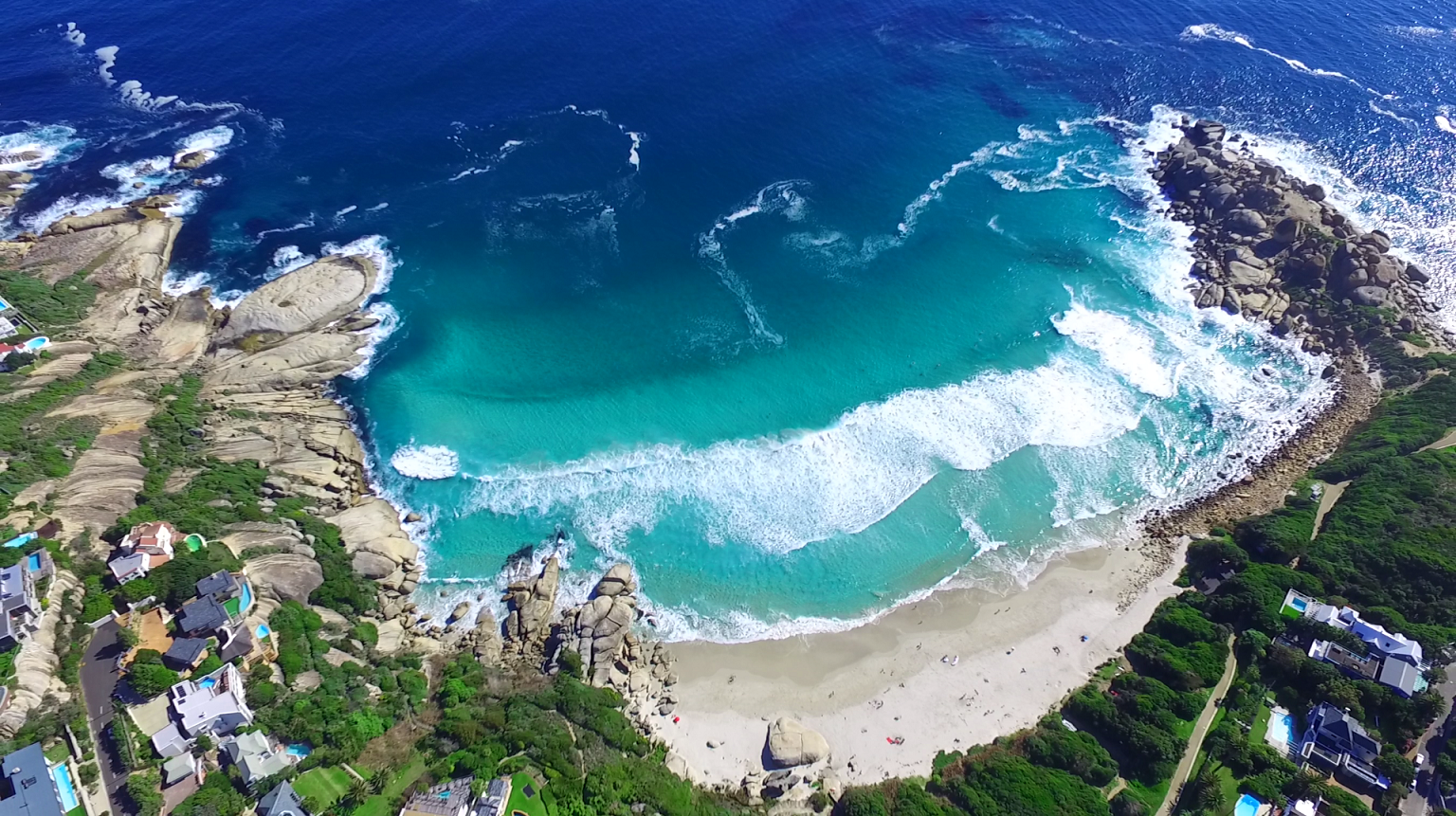
An aerial view of Llandudno beach.

Llandudno is a seaside suburb of Cape Town, South Africa, located in the Atlantic Seaboard region. It has been granted Blue Flag status, an international recognition of its high quality. There are no street lights, shops or commercial activities, and the town has some of the most expensive residential property in South Africa.

Llandudno Beach is one of the Cape's most naturally diverse beaches, surrounded by large granite boulders and overlooked by mountains. It is a popular surfing spot. Llandudno has lifeguards on duty during the summer season, operated by the Llandudno Surf Lifesaving Club (LSLC). It is also the access point for the walk to Sandy Bay, an isolated beach still popular with nudists.

On 26 September 1903, the valley was declared a township and named Llandudno after the North Wales seaside resort of Llandudno, which means "Parish of Saint Tudno" in the Welsh language. The striking similarities between Kleinkommetjie Bay in which the valley resides and Llandudno in Wales were noted as reasons for choosing this name.
