= São José Paquete Africa =

Portuguese slave ship wrecked off Cape Town in 1794

São José–Paquete de Africa
History

Kingdom of Portugal
- Name: São José Paquete Africa
- Fate: Sank: December 27, 1794

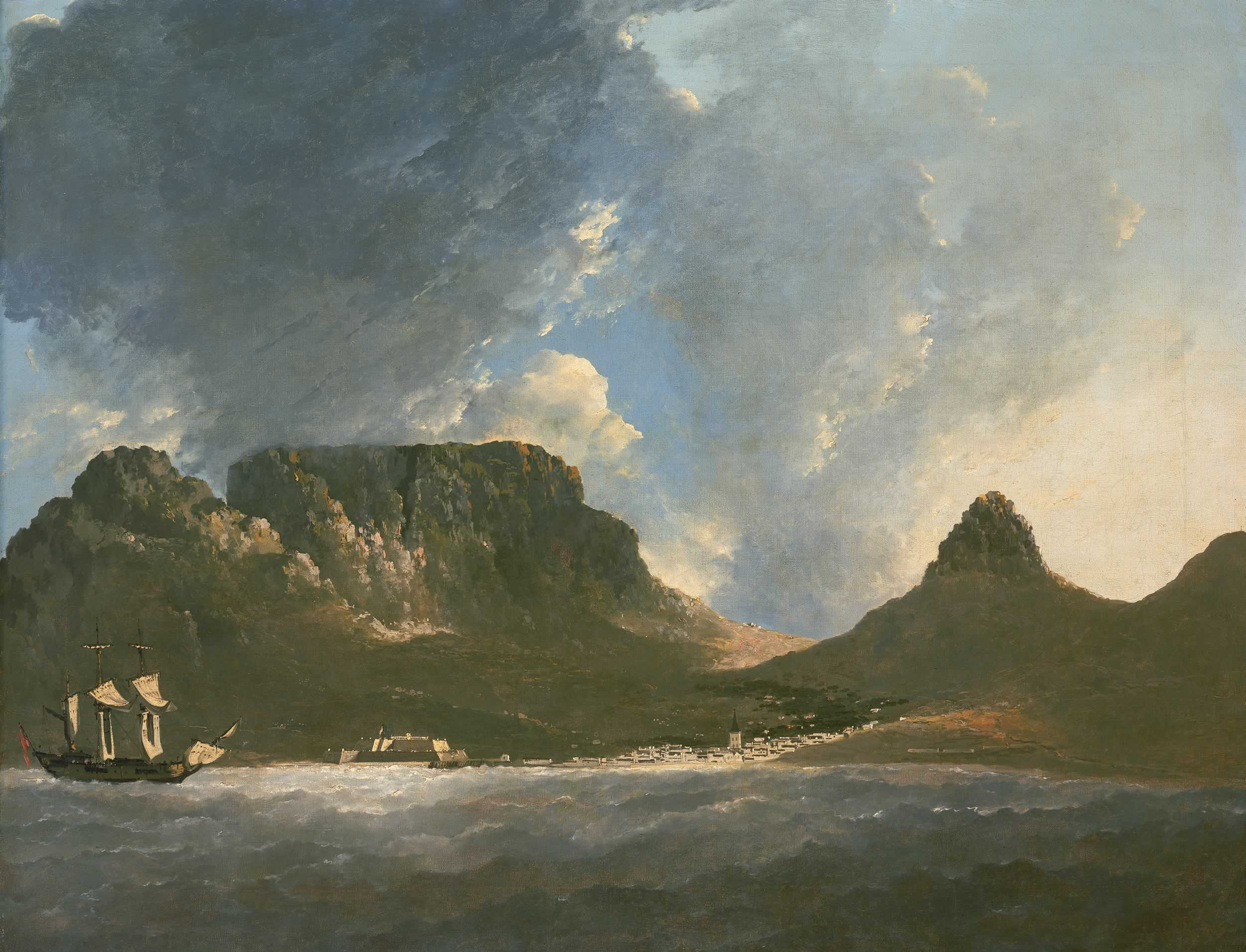
Hodges painting of the Cape (1772). Near here, in 1794, the slaver São José Paquete Africa sank with her human cargo.

The São José Paquete Africa (also, São José-Paquete de Africa) was a Portuguese slave ship that sank in 1794 off the coast of Cape Town, South Africa. Close to shore, but in deep water, 212 of the 400 to 500 African slaves who were aboard died when the ship sank. In 2015, the Smithsonian's African American History Museum, South Africa's Iziko Museums, the Slave Wrecks Project, and other partners, confirmed discovery of the wreck near where it sank. The ship and its slaves were headed from Portuguese Mozambique to Colonial Brazil, during the height of the international African slave trade. Few other former slave ships have been found, but the São José is the first and only shipwreck discovered, as of June 3, 2015, of a working slave ship, which sank in transit with its human cargo aboard.

== History ==
Diagram images of types of Portuguese slave transport, similar to other slavers

On April 27, 1794, the São José sailed from Lisbon, Portugal, captained by Manuel João Pereira. In its hold were a load of carefully calibrated iron ballasts that sailing ships required in order to effectively transport on the open ocean the shifting weight of hundreds of individual captive humans. The ship's destination, the Portuguese colony of Mozambique in southeastern Africa, was a relatively new source of slave labor for the Atlantic slave trade. The São José is one of the first known ships to attempt the long-distance voyage from Portugal to Mozambique to Brazil.

The ship’s path represents European slave traders’ increased efforts to obtain slaves. More than two centuries of slave trade along Africa’s west coast reduced the population, and along with increasing competition, motivated Portugal to send ships 7,000 miles to one of the farthest, cheapest sources of slaves in the trans-Atlantic trade, Mozambique, Africa, and then ship the slaves around the Cape of Africa to Brazil.

In early December, at the port on the Island of Mozambique, the ship's crew loaded their human cargo and got under way. The enslaved men, women and children were likely from the interior of Mozambique. Their travel in the slave hold to Maranhão, Brazil, was set to take some four months. The journey lasted only a few weeks.

The ship was attempting to make its way through the difficult waters off the Cape at about 2:00 a.m. December 27. Near Camps Bay, it ran into submerged rocks about 100 meters (330 ft) from shore. With the ship in distress, the crew raised the alarm by firing the cannons. A barque with some of the human cargo was able to reach the safety of the Cape Colony. Relays of ropes with baskets were also employed to help save lives but the ship broke into pieces about 5:00. The captain and all the crew were rescued, but hundreds of the slaves drowned, possibly in their iron shackles. The survivors were soon sold in the Cape Colony.

== Discovery ==
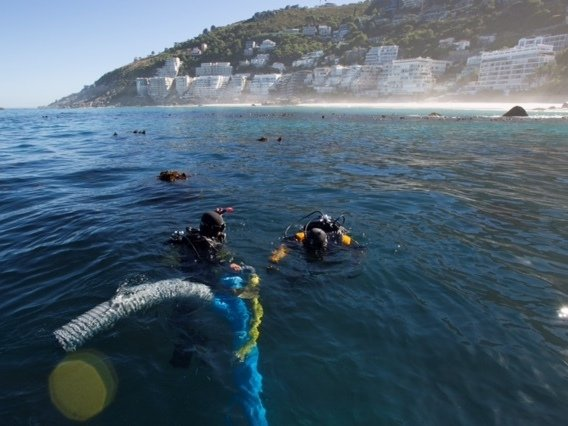
Divers near the wrecksite

Local divers found the wreck off of Clifton beach in the 1980s but misidentified it as a Dutch merchant ship. Several items from the ship, including bolts, cannon balls and cannons were removed by treasure hunters. Discoveries in archives in South Africa and Portugal, as well as tests of artifacts confirmed in 2015 that the ship was the São José slave ship. On June 3, 2015, along with the formal announcement of the find, a memorial service was held for the lost. Three divers from South Africa, the United States, and Mozambique scattered soil from the slaves' homeland in the surf not far from the wreck. Artifacts from the dive site were displayed at the South Africa's Iziko Museum's Slave Lodge in June 2015, and undergo conservation efforts there, with additional research and recovery continuing. Some artifacts were loaned for display at the United States' African American History Museum, when it opened in 2016. Connected with the 2015 anniversary of the abolition of slavery in South Africa and the work on the Sao Jose, the Iziko launched a new website exhibition, Slavery in South Africa.

== See also ==
- Shipwrecks of Cape Town
