= POA (album) =

Studio album by Blocco Mentale
- Released: 1973
- Genre: Progressive rock, Italian Progressive Rock
- Label: Titania

POA (meaning "grass" in Greek) is the first and only studio album by the Italian progressive rock band Blocco Mentale. It was released in 1973.

== Track listing ==
1. Capita (4:44)
2. Aria E Mele (4:34)
3. Impressione (8:27)
4. Io E Me (4:27)
5. La Nuova Forza (7:37)
6. Ritorno (5:34)
7. Verde (3:52)

Bonus on CD

1. L`amore Muore A Vent`Anni
2. Lei E Musica
