= Bantry Bay, Cape Town =

Suburb of Cape Town on the coastal slopes of Lion's Head

Bantry Bay
- Suburb of Cape Town
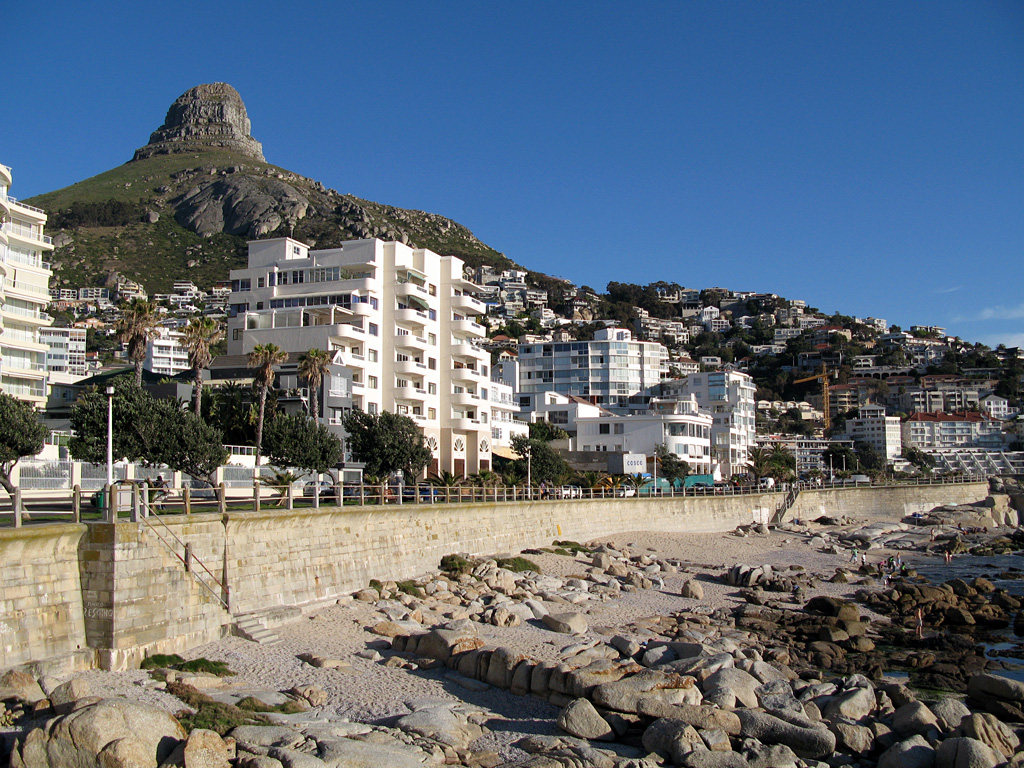
- Interactive map of Bantry Bay
- Coordinates: 33°55′39″S 18°22′49″E
- Country: South Africa
- Province: Western Cape
- Municipality: City of Cape Town
- Main Place: Cape Town

Area
  - Total: 0.38 km^{2} (0.15 sq mi)

Population (2011)
  - Total: 820
  - Density: 2,200/km^{2} (5,600/sq mi)

Racial makeup (2011)
  - Black African: 13.8%
  - Coloured: 7.7%
  - Indian/Asian: 1.3%
  - White: 75.5%
  - Other: 1.7%

First languages (2011)
  - English: 71.5%
  - Afrikaans: 12.4%
  - Xhosa: 3.8%
  - Zulu: 1.7%
  - Other: 10.5%
- Time zone: UTC+2 (SAST)
- Postal code (street): 8005
- Area code: 021

Bantry Bay is an affluent suburb of Cape Town in the Western Cape Province of South Africa. It is situated on the slopes of Lion's Head, in the Atlantic Seaboard region of the city, overlooking a rocky coastline. Its neighboring suburbs are Sea Point and Clifton. It was originally called Botany Bay after a botanical garden that was planted here for the cultivation of medicinal herbs. The name was changed during the First World War.

It is overlooked by Lion's Head, which is an eroded outlier of sandstone. There is a plaque on the seashore that commemorates a visit by Charles Darwin, who made important geological observations here relating to the nature and origin of granite.

The ratepayers, residents and local businesses in the area are represented by the Sea Point, Fresnaye & Bantry Bay Ratepayers and Residents Association (SFB), a volunteer-led organization financed by donations and memberships.

The SFB's mandate includes defending the heritage of the area, construction applications, providing added security and cleansing above what is provided by the City and State, and communications with residents and ratepayers, as well as on behalf of these parties with stakeholders such as the City of Cape Town.
