= Paige Nick =

South African novelist

Paige Nick is a South African novelist, columnist and advertising copywriter.

== Early life ==
Paige Rachael Nick (born 1974) grew up and was schooled in Cape Town, South Africa at Camps Bay High School. After matriculating in 1991 she was a Rotary Exchange Student in Dickinson, North Dakota in 1992 where she graduated from Dickinson High School and attended Dickinson State University. In January 1993 she studied copywriting and marketing at AAA School of Advertising. In December 1993, she joined TBWA Hunt Lascaris Cape Town for a student holiday job and was hired as a junior copywriter in January 1994.

== Career ==
=== Books ===
Nick's first novel, A Million Miles from Normal, published in May 2010 and her second novel, This Way Up, was published in May 2011, both by Penguin Books South Africa.

In 2013 she joined up with Sarah Lotz and Helen Moffett, to co-author a series of Choose Your Own Adventure erotic novels, including, A Girl Walks into a Bar, A Girl Walks into a Wedding and A Girl Walks into a Blind Date, which were sold in 24 countries around the world, represented by A.M. Heath UK. They were published by Little, Brown (UK) and Harper Collins USA and Jonathan Ball Publishers in South Africa among others.

In April 2015 Nick's Pens Behaving Badly was published by Kwela Books South Africa. It is a compilation of her Sunday Times columns and the crazy letters they inspired.

In 2015, Nick launched Death By Carbs (Bookstorm), a banting spoof, where she murdered then dieting icon Tim Noakes on the first page. The book was runner up in the 2016 Nielsen Booksellers' Choice Awards.

In May 2016, Nick launched comedy novel Dutch Courage with Penguin Random House in South Africa and in the UK where it was called The Wrong Knickers for a Wednesday, published by HarperCollins UK.

And in 2017 Unpresidented (Bookstorm) was launched, a political spoof skewering then president of South Africa, Jacob Zuma.

In 2025 Book People came out with Pan Macmillan South Africa, based on her real life online book club, The Good Book Appreciation Society.

=== Column ===
From October 2011 to February 2015 Nick wrote a weekly column on sex, dating, and romance, and other crazy shenanigans, for the Sunday Times newspaper in South Africa.

=== Advertising ===
For more than thirty years, Nick has worked in various ad agencies around the world on many global brands.

Nick has won numerous advertising awards including Loeries, two Loerie Grand Prix, multiple awards at the Cannes Lions International Advertising Festival held annually in France, The Art Director's Club of New York, Clios, and recognition at one of the world's most prestigious advertising awards, D&AD.

In 2013 Nick left full-time agency life together with her long-time Art Director Karin Barry-McCormack to go freelance as a high-concept creative team working with agencies and clients from New York City to Canada, Singapore, London, Australia, Joburg and Cape Town.

== The Good Book Appreciation Society ==
In 2013 Nick started The Good Book Appreciation Society on Facebook. Wary of Facebook pages for book lovers that have become a playground for self-promotion, Nick started the "secret" virtual book club as a place for readers (many of them writers too), to post honestly about books by way of reviews, queries and interviews with authors. As of April 2026 the club had over 25 000 members.

== Fine Music Radio ==
In 2021 Paige Nick started hosting Book Choice, an hour-long book review show on Fine Music Radio with a selection of Cape Town's finest book reviewers and interviewers, the show soon acquired sponsorship from Exclusive Books.

In 2024 she added Book Choice Publishers' Choice to the franchise, a new show in which three of South Africa's top publishers; Pan Macmillan, Jonathan Ball and Penguin Random House, join South Africa's number one Bookseller, Exclusive Books to host a second hour-long show every month.

== Hermanus Fyn Arts Book Festival ==
In 2026, Paige Nick curated the Hermanus Fyn Arts Book Festival, hosting a series of book panels and events in Hermanus in June 2026.

== Bibliography ==
- A Million Miles from Normal (2010)
- This Way Up (2011)
- A Girl Walks into a Bar (2013) By Helena S. Paige
- A Girl Walks into a Wedding (2014) By Helena S. Paige
- A Girl Walks into a Blind Date (2015) By Helena S. Paige
- Pens Behaving Badly (2015)
- Death By Carbs (2015)
- Dutch Courage (2016) — published in the UK as The Wrong Knickers for a Wednesday by HarperCollins UK
- Unpresidented (2017)
- Book People (2025)
