= Price on application =

In a list or ad, price given upon request

Price on application (sometimes price on asking), more commonly abbreviated as POA, is a term often seen on price lists, classified advertisements and is commonly used with regard to real estate prices. It means the seller or selling agent must be contacted in order to obtain the price.

== Rationale ==
A numeric price for an item may be withheld or simply unavailable for a number of reasons.

- POA can be used as a placeholder when no price has been decided yet
- Prices may fluctuate frequently (e.g. gasoline), leading to a price given in a publication to go quickly out of date.
- A product may get highly customised, in which case it will be impractical to give a fixed price
- Some online listing systems internally sort POA items as being either very cheap or very expensive meaning they will appear at the start of a price-sorted list. This might lead users of such listing systems to intentionally enter their item as POA (even if they could give a price) in order to stand out.

=== Real estate and classified advertisement ===
Prices can be deliberately concealed in an attempt to prevent potential buyers from spotting (usually downward) trends in price that could tempt them into waiting for further price decreases before submitting an offer.

In the case of real estate an owner may, for whatever reason, feel uncomfortable with revealing a given price to the public; an estate agent may also want to prevent trends in property prices over a given area from becoming public information.

Perhaps the most nefarious use of the "price on application" term is as a mild low-ball technique. Even though no initial low price is given, the potential buyer might expect a reasonable price and proceed to enquire. The seller assumes a potential buyer is less likely to go elsewhere once the initial enquiry has been made. The seller will also be given more of a chance to pitch their product to a potential buyer when they enquire about the price.

A property marked as "price on application" may come across as being overpriced and will put off most genuine buyers.

Some sellers wish to have the opportunity to size up potential buyers and find out how keen they are and how much they are able to afford. POA gives these sellers the freedom to come up with a customised price for each potential buyer.

=== Jewellers ===
Often, high-end jewelers do not have price tags so that sales representatives can pitch items before the customer finds out the price.
