= Cape Peninsula =

Rocky peninsula in the Western Cape, South Africa

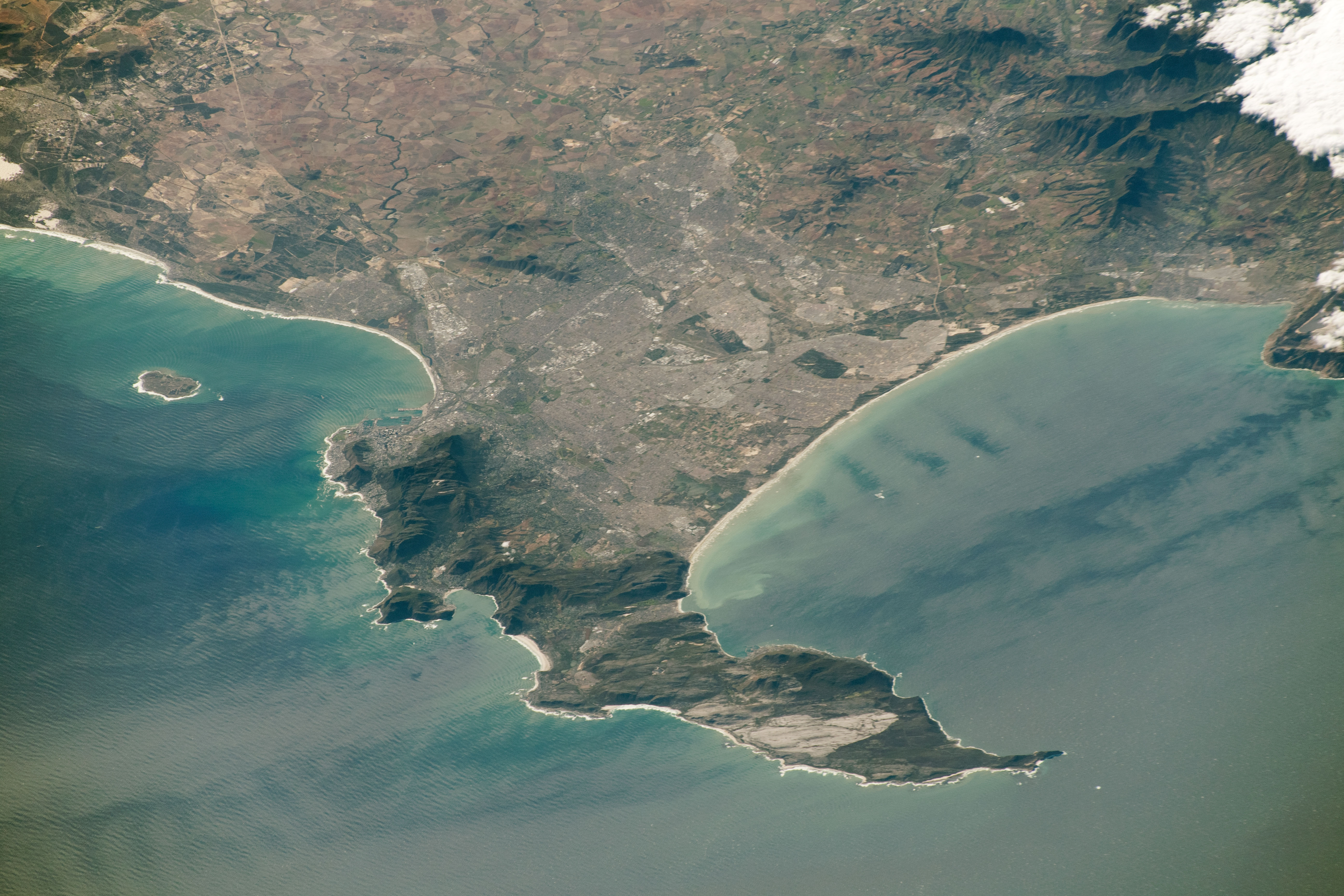
View of the Cape Peninsula showing the City of Cape Town and False Bay in the background from the International Space Station, May 2019

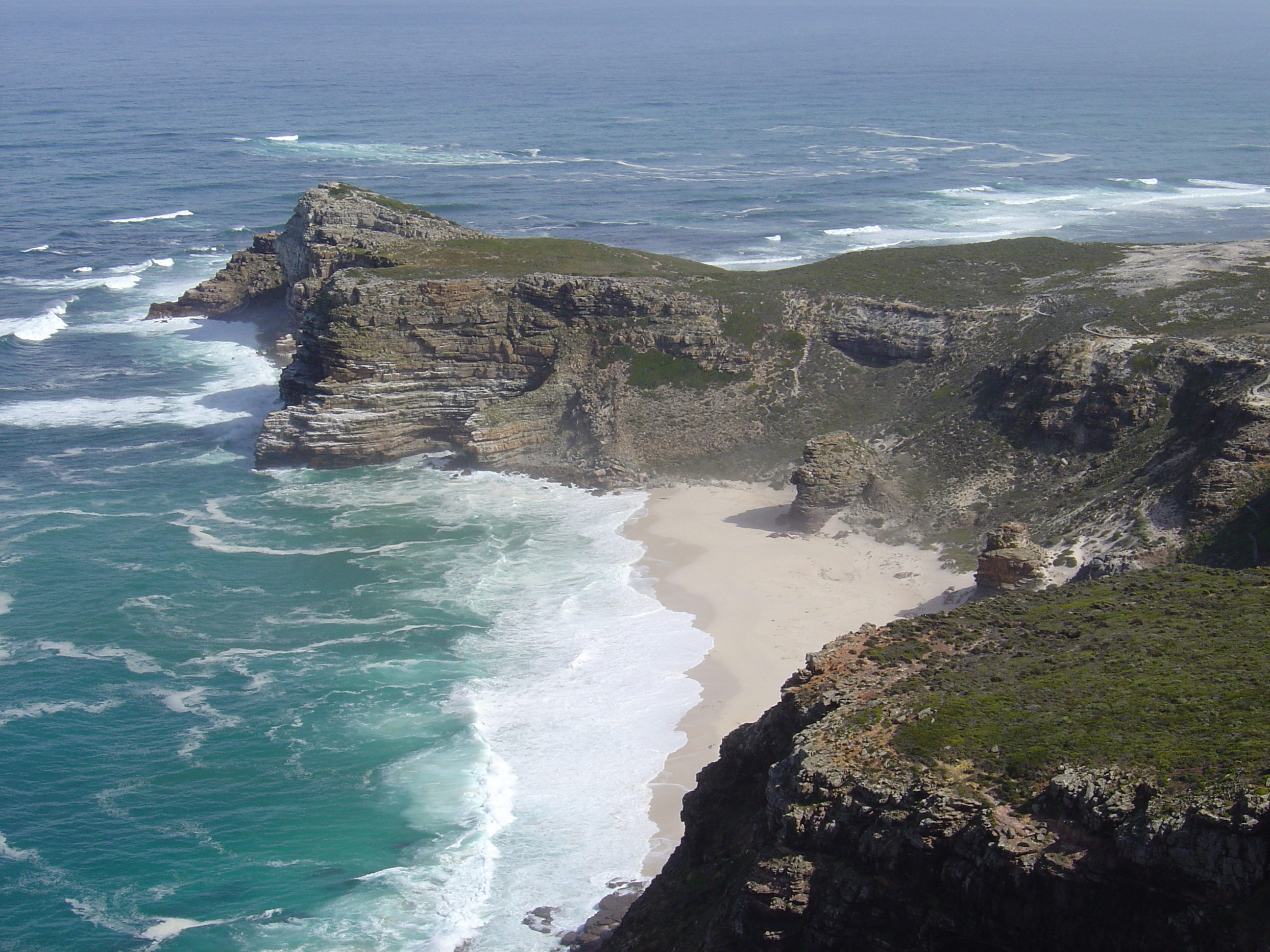
The Cape of Good Hope; looking towards the west over Diaz Beach, from the coastal cliffs above Cape Point.

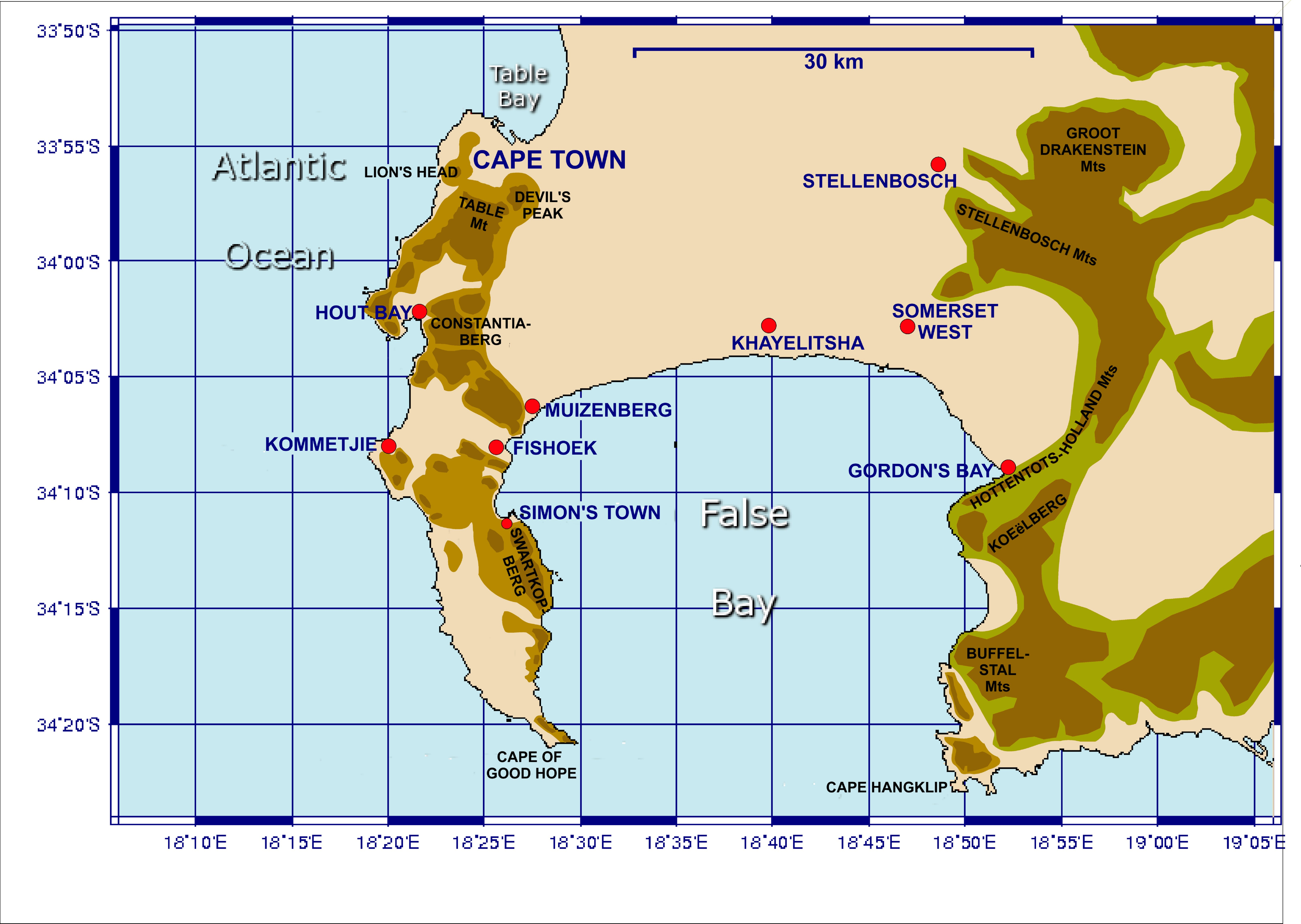
Map showing the Cape Peninsula, illustrating the positions of the Cape Town City Centre, Table Mountain, the main mountains and peaks that make up the Peninsula, and the Cape of Good Hope.

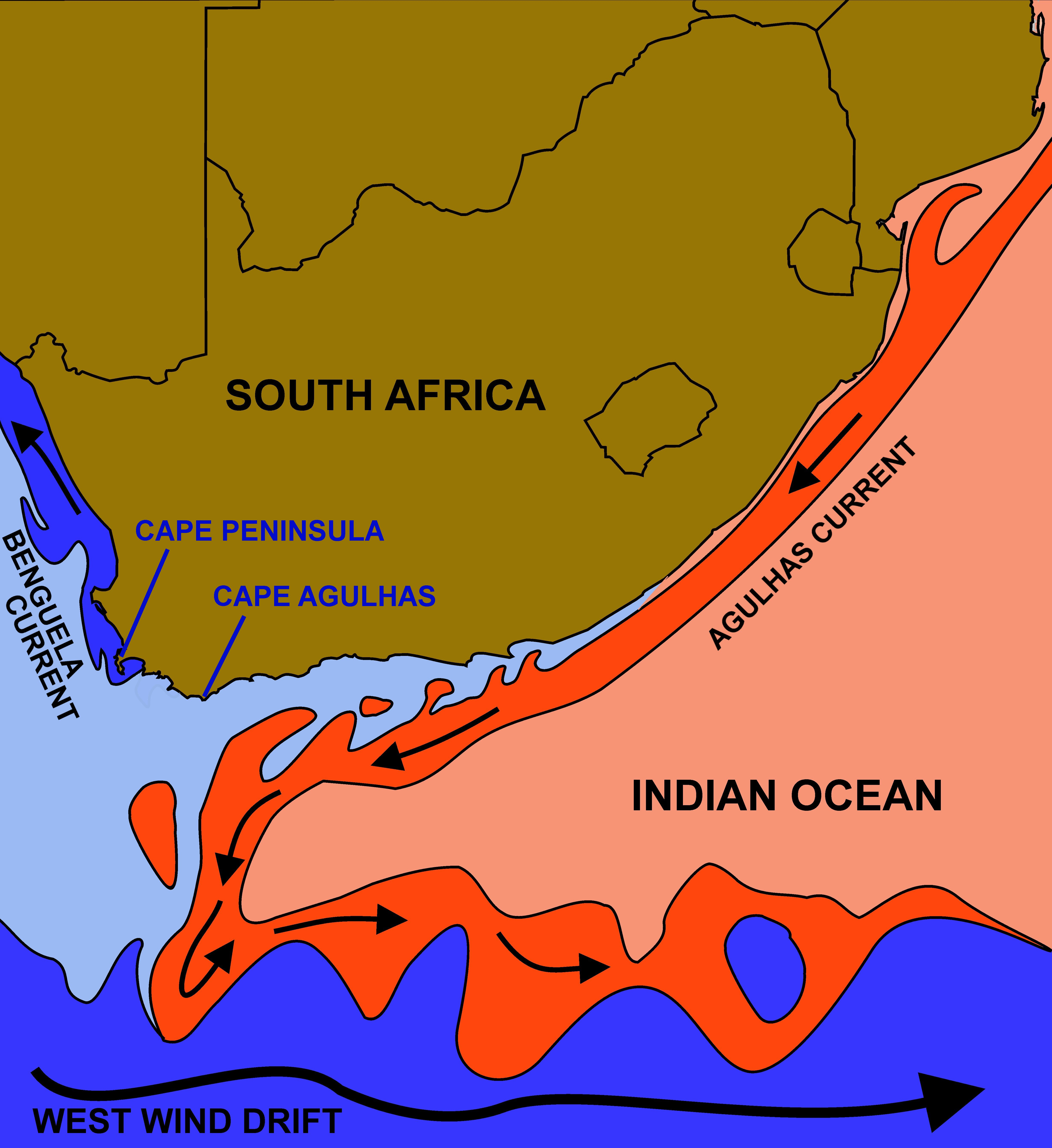
The courses of the warm Agulhas current (red) along the east coast of South Africa, and the cold Benguela current (blue) along the west coast. Note that the Benguela current does not originate from Antarctic waters in the South Atlantic Ocean, but from upwelling of water from the cold depths of the Atlantic Ocean against the west coast of the continent. The two currents do not "meet" anywhere along the south coast of Africa.

The Cape Peninsula (Afrikaans: Kaapse Skiereiland) of South Africa is a generally mountainous peninsula that juts out into the Atlantic Ocean at the south-western extremity of the African continent. At the southern end of the peninsula are Cape Point and the Cape of Good Hope. On the northern end is Table Mountain, overlooking Table Bay and the City Bowl of Cape Town, South Africa. The peninsula is 52 km long from Mouille point in the north to Cape Point in the south. The Peninsula has been an island on and off for the past 5 million years, as sea levels fell and rose with the ice age and interglacial global warming cycles of, particularly, the Pleistocene. The last time that the Peninsula was an island was about 1.5 million years ago. Soon afterwards it was joined to the mainland by the emergence from the sea of the sandy area now known as the Cape Flats. The towns and villages of the Cape Peninsula and Cape Flats, and the undeveloped land of the rest of the peninsula now form part of the City of Cape Town metropolitan municipality. The Cape Peninsula is bounded to the north by Table Bay, to the west by the open Atlantic Ocean, and to the east by False Bay in the south and the Cape Flats in the north.

The peninsula is mostly the mountainous remnant of very old durable sandstone formations with low dip, deposited unconformably on an ancient underlying granite peneplain. The climate is of the Mediterranean type, with predominantly winter rainfall and mild temperatures, and the natural vegetation is exceptionally diverse, with an unusually large number of endemic plant species for an area of this size, many of which are endangered, and threatened by human activity and encroachment, but are to some extent protected on the large part of the peninsula which is in Table Mountain National Park. The coastal waters include a major seaport in Table Bay, and a marine protected area in the two adjacent but significantly different marine ecoregions, which meet at Cape Point. Most of the lower lying coastal land of the central and northern peninsula has been developed as first agricultural, and later urban areas. The rocky uplands have historically avoided development because of difficult access, poor soils and steep slopes, and more recently have been legally protected as being of high ecological importance, but are threatened by illegal land invasion and informal settlement.

== Physical geography ==
The Cape Peninsula is 52 km long from Mouille point in the north to Cape Point in the south, with an area of about 470 km^{2}, and it displays more topographical variety than other similar sized areas in southern Africa, and consequently spectacular scenery. There are diverse low-nutrient soils, large rocky outcrops, scree slopes, a mainly rocky coastline with embayed beaches, and considerable local variation in climatic conditions.

The sedimentary rocks of the Cape Supergroup, of which parts of the Graafwater and Peninsula Formations remain, were uplifted between 280 and 21S million years ago, and were largely eroded away during the Mesozoic. The region was geologically stable during the Tertiary, which has led to slow denudation of the durable sandstones. Erosion rate and drainage has been influenced by fault lines and fractures, leaving remnant steep-sided massifs like Table Mountain surrounded by flatter slopes of deposits of the eroded material overlaying the older rocks,

There are two internationally notable landmarks, Table Mountain and Cape Point, at opposite ends of the Peninsula Mountain Chain, with the Cape Flats and False Bay to the east and the Atlantic Ocean to the west. The landscape is dominated by sandstone plateaux and ridges, which generally drop steeply at their margins to the surrounding debris slopes, interrupted by a major gap at the Fish Hoek–Noordhoek valley. In the south much of the area is a low sandstone plateau with sand dunes. Maximum altitude is 1113 m on Table Mountain.

=== Mountains ===
Mountains and peaks:

- Baboon hill (500 m),
- Belle Ombre 725 m,
- Blinkwater Peak 989 m 33.967325°S 18.402884°E, above Camp's Bay,
- Blokhuiskop 417 m,
- Bokkop 410 m (405 m),
- Bonteberg 237 m 34°13.091′S 18°23.058′E, hill south of Scarborough,
- Brakkloofrant 305 m,
- Cave Peak 445 m,
- Chapman's Peak 592 m, south of Hout Bay
- Cleft Peak 833 m,
- Constantiaberg 900 m, to the south of Constantia Nek on the eastern route to Hout Bay valley,
- Corridor Buttress (St. Paul) 750 m,
- Dassenberg (163 m), in Noordhoek valley,
- Dassiekop 640 m,
- Devil's Peak 1,000 m 33°57.277′S 18°26.428′E, peak to the east of the City Bowl
- Eagles Nest 417 m,
- Else Peak (Elsie's Peak) (303m), 34°09.000′S 18°26.113′E, a small peak between Simon's Town and Fish Hoek,
- Fernwood Peak 1,003 m,
- Fountain Peak 1,051 m,
- Grootkop 857 m,
- Grootkop 390 m, northeast of Scarborough
- Higher Steenberg Peak 537 m,
- Judas Peak (758 m), southernmost peak in the chain of peaks known as the 12 Apostles on the west side of the peninsula,
- Judas Peak (319 m), 34°16.7′S 18°28.3′E, the peak above the cliffs to the immediate south of Smitswinkel Bay,
- Junction Peak 919 m,
- Kalkbaaiberg (Kalk Bay Peak) 516 m (517m), 34°06.737′S 18°26.382′E, the peak above Kalk Bay
- Kapteinspiek 414 m, to the west of Hout Bay, east of Karbonkelberg,
- Karbonkelberg 653 m, above Duiker Point, west of Hout Bay,
- Klaassenskop 742 m,
- Klaasjagersberg 560 m,
- Klassenkop 902 m,
- Klein Blouberg,
- Klein-Tuinkop 492 m,
- Langeberg (c320 m),
- Lion's Head (Leeukop) 669 m 33°56.120′S 18°23.356′E, peak to the west of the City Bowl,
- Little Lions Head (Klein Leeukop) 436 m 34°00.975′S 18°20.655′E, peak between Llandudno and Hout Bay valley,
- Lower Chapman's Peak 500 m,
- Low Steenberg 463 m (504 m),
- Maiden Peak 372 m,
- Matrooskop (109m), 34°19.576′S 18°27.834′E, a small local peak inshore of Buffels Bay,
- Minor Peak 856 m, peak on the north flank of Devil's Peak
- Muizenberg 507 m (509m), 34°06.006′S 18°27.556′E, the peak to the west of Muizenberg suburb, and the northernmost peak directly overlooking the west side of False Bay,
- Noordhoek Lower 494 m,
- Noordhoek Peak (Noordhoekpiek) (764 m),
- North Peak 477 m (486m),
- Paulsberg (369m), 34°17.635′S 18°27.808′E, highest peak overlooking the south side of Smitswinkel Bay,
- Platkop 371 m,
- Reserve Peak 844 m,
- Ridge Peak 507 m,
- Rooihoogte 275 m, (above Smitswinkel Bay)
- Rooikrans 193 m 34°08.640′S 18°22.512′E,
- Saint James Peak 422 m,
- Saint Michael Peak 917 m,
- Sentinel (Hangberg) 331 m 34°03.580′S 18°20.287′E, peak on west side of Hout Bay,
- Signal Hill 340 m 33°55.033′S 18°24.249′E, ridge north of Lion's Head, separating the City Bowl from the Atlantic Seaboard,
- Simonsberg 564 m (548 m), 34°12.299′S 18°26.304′E, the peak above Simon's Town,
- Skildersgatkop (127 m),
- Skoorsteenkop 523 m,
- Skoorsteenberg Sub 540 m,
- Slangolie Buttress 780 m,
- Spitskop 447 m,
- Steenbergkoppie 290 m,
- Suther Peak 614 m 34°02.008′S 18°19.659′E,
- Swartkop (Zwartkop) (679 m), 34°12.943′S 18°27.025′E, the highest point on the Southern Peninsula,
- Table Mountain (Maclear's Beacon), (1,086 m) 33°58.008′S 18°25.532′E, highest point on the Cape Peninsula
- Trappies Kop (Trappieskop), (240 m) 34°07.668′S 18°26.414′E, the hill above Kalk Bay,
- Twelve Apostles a group of several peaks and buttresses along the west coast south of Table Mountain
- Vasco da Gama Peak (Cape Point Highpoint) 250 m (266m), 34°20′41.07″S 18°28′29.32″E, the highest point nearest the mouth of False Bay on the Cape Peninsula,
- Vlakkenberg 560 m,
- Vlooiberg 377 m,
- Wolfkop 393 m,

Passes (cols):

- Kloof Nek, pass between City Bowl and Camps Bay, col between table mountain and Lion's Head,
- Constantia Nek, pass between Southern Suburbs and Hout Bay valley,
- (Ou Kaapse Weg), pass between Southern Suburbs and Fish Hoek valley,
- (Redhill Road),
- pass between Llandudno and Hout Bay valley, col between Judas Peak and Little Lion's Head,

Valleys and gorges:

- Disa gorge
- Fish Hoek–Noordhoek valley
- Hout Bay valley
- Platteklip gorge
- Skeleton gorge

=== Coastline ===
If using the river drainage to define the extent of the peninsula, the coastline extends from the mouth of the Salt River in Table Bay to the mouth of Sandvlei at Muizenberg.

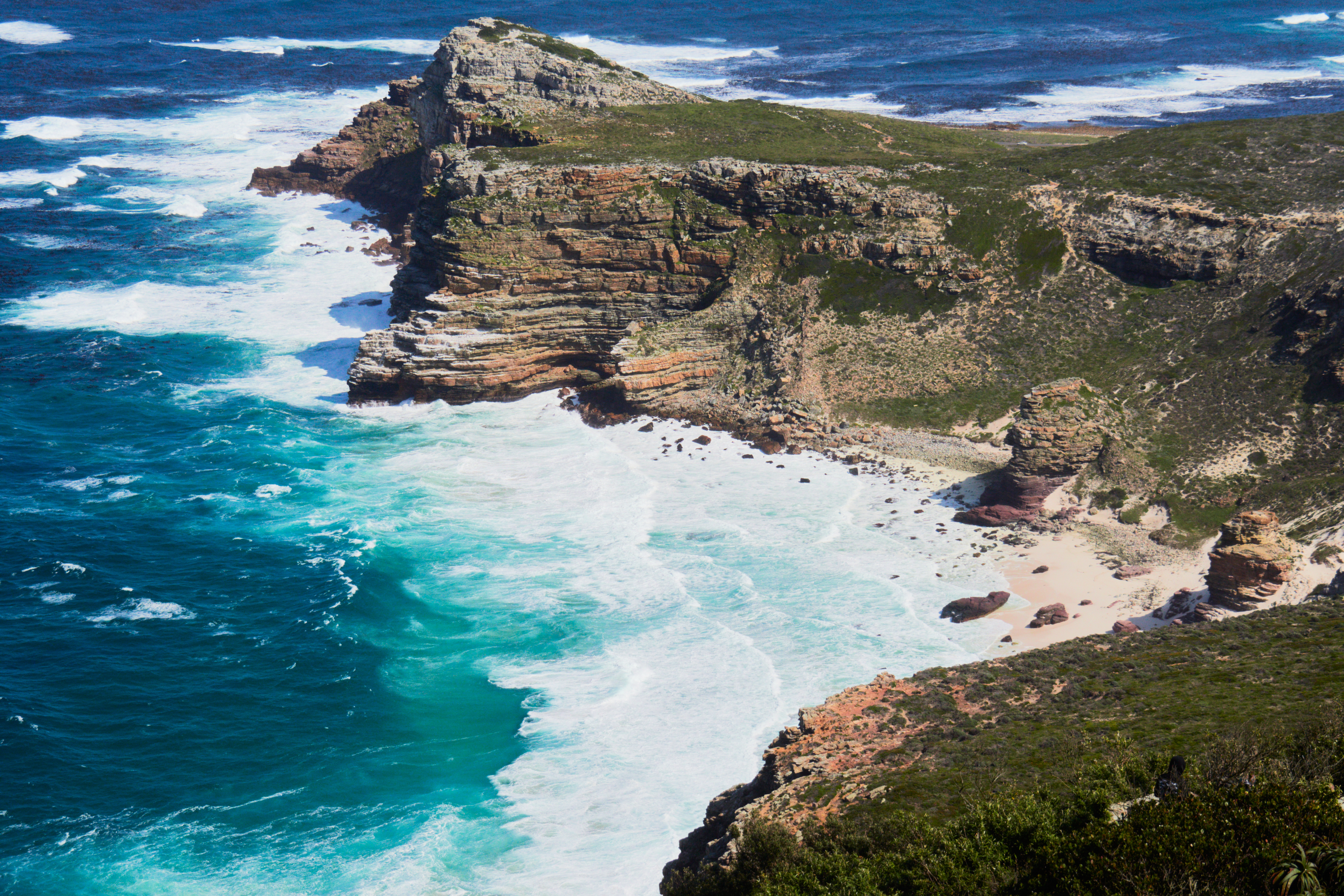
Rocky coastal headland and small sandy beach on the Cape Peninsula, with layered sandstone cliffs meeting the ocean.

==== West coast ====
- Salt River mouth, 33°54.473′S 18°2.339′E
- Table Bay,, the northern boundary of the Cape Peninsula
- Granger Bay 33°53.966′S 18°24.896′E, harbour mouth
- Mouille Point, 33°53.931′S 18°24.745′E,
- Green Point lighthouse 33°54.088′S 18°23.996′E
- Three-Anchor Bay,
- Rocklands Beach,
- Sea Point 33°55.322′S 18°22.618′E,
- Bantry Bay, a small rocky bay. 33°55.564′S 18°22.670′E,
- Clifton Bay, which has four sandy beaches separated by rocky outcrops extending to the water's edge;,
  - Clifton First Beach,
  - Clifton Second Beach,
  - Clifton Third Beach,
  - Clifton Fourth Beach,
- Camps Bay,
  - Glen Beach,
  - Camps Bay Beach,
- Bakoven Bay,
- Koeëlbaai33°58.332′S 18°22.172′E, a narrow beach of wave-rounded boulders
- Oudekraal 33°59.270′S 18°20.923′E
- Sandy Bay,
  - Sandy Bay beach34°1.423′S 18°19.885′E
- Oude Schip, a low rocky promontory at the north of Leeugat bay. 34°01.683′S 18°18.647′E
- Die Middelmas, a cluster of large exposed granite rocks a short distance southwest of the point at Oude Schip.34°01.752′S 18°18.329′E
- Leeugat,, also known as Maori Bay, for the wreck of the SS Maori, a rocky bay to the west of Karbonkelberg, between Duiker Point and Oude Schip,
- Duiker Point, a rocky promontory at the foot of Karbonkelberg, marking the south of Leeugat Bay.34°02.320′S 18°18.447′E
- Duiker Island, a low granite islet used by a breeding colony of Cape fur seals.34°03.512′S 18°18.623′E
- Hout Bay,
  - York Point 34°03.323′S 18°20.898′E
  - Hout Bay harbour mouth 34°03.075′S 18°20.990′E
  - Hout Bay beach,
- Blockhouse Point34°3.322′S 18°21.735′E
- Die Josie 34°4.586′S 18°21.292′E
- Chapman's Point 34°05.459′S 18°20.959′E, Major promontory between Hout Bay and Chapmans Bay at the foot of Chapman's Peak,
- Chapman's Bay,
  - Noordhoek Beach,
- Klein Slangkoppunt,
- Slangkoppunt,
- Witsandsbaai,
  - Witsands Beach,
- Schuster's Bay,, a small bay at Scarborough
  - Schuster's Bay beach (Scarborough Beach),,
- Olifantsbospunt 34°16.351′S 18°22.847′E,
- Hoek van Bobbejaan 35°18.485′S 18°24.187′E,
- Cape of Good Hope (Cape Maclear),
- Diaz Beach,
- Cape Point, 34°21′26″S 18°29′51″E, the south-westernmost point of the bay, marked by the current lighthouse and the original lighthouse,

==== False Bay coast ====
Landmarks of the False Bay coastline:

- Rooikrans, 34°20.456′S 18°28.407′E, a cliff area with a small sea cave,
- Buffels Bay, 34°19.123′S 18°27.650′E, a small bay on the west side of False Bay, with a small craft slipway,
- Bordjiesrif,
- Hell's Gate,
- Batsata Rock, 34°16.603′S 18°28.836′E, an exposed inshore granite rock below Judas Peak near the northern boundary of the Paulsberg restricted zone, and the southern limit of Smitswinkel Bay,
- Smitswinkel Bay, 34°16.007′S 18°28.261′E, a small bay on the west side of False Bay, with a few coastal houses,
- Partridge Point 34°15.343′S 18°28.606′E, a granite corestone promontory with several large exposed inshore rocks extending about a hundred metres into the bay on the north side of Smitswinkel Bay,
- Finlay's Point, 34°14′56.9″S 18°28′36.5″E, a smaller granite corestone promontory north of Partridge Point,
- Castle Rocks 34°14.362′S 18°28.661′E, a larger granite corestone promontory, comprising a massive and fairly high outcrop at the end of a small, low isthmus, with several large inshore exposed rocks south of Miller's Point,
- Rumbly Bay, 34°14.020′S 18°28.489′E, a small cove with a small craft slipway on the south side of Miller's Point,
- Millers Point, 34°13.932′S 18°28.587′E, a fairly large but low granite corestone promontory, with a small craft slipway on the northwest side, and several exposed and drying rocks extending to seaward,
- Rocklands Point, 34°12.964′S 18°27.921′E, a minor granite promontory north of Miller's Point, with a few exposed inshore rocks
- Oatlands Point, 34°12.067′S 18°27.395′E, a minor granite promontory with a large and several smaller inshore exposed rocks and a shoreline navigation beacon,
- Fishermans Beach, a short, sandy beach north of Oatlands Point,
- Froggy Pond, 34°12.219′S 18°27.418′E, a small cove with a small sandy beach north of Fishermans Beach separated by a low rocky promontory,
- Windmill Beach, 34°12.067′S 18°27.395′E, a small sandy beach partly enclosed by massive granite boulders, with two small coves,
- Simon's Bay, 34°11.073′S 18°25.945′E, the largest bay on the west side of False Bay, very well protected from the prevailing south westerly swell, but fairly exposed to wind and waves from the south-east,
  - Boulders Beach, Seaforth, 34°11.833′S 18°27.082′E, a sandy beach between large scattered granite boulders,
  - Simon's Town Naval Base harbour, 34°11.317′S 18°26.283′E, a man-made harbour with breakwater and sea-walls enclosing the naval dockyard,
  - Long Beach, 34°11.236′S 18°25.579′E, a sandy beach on the west side of Simon's Bay, usually in the lee of the harbour for south easterly winds,
  - Mackerel Bay, 34°10.302′S 18°25.761′E, a small sandy beach north of Simon's Town,
  - Elsebaai, 34°09.593′S 18°25.921′E, a small bay in the north part of Simon's Bay,
    - Glencairn beach
- Fish Hoek bay, (Vishoekbaai)34.13745°S 18.43374°E, the northernmost minor bay of the west side of False Bay with a sandy beach open to the sea,
  - Fish Hoek beach, 34°08.160′S 18°26.148′E, a sandy beach on the east side of the Fish Hoek–Noordhoek gap, a low-lying break in the mountain range of the peninsula between False Bay and the Atlantic coast.
- Kalk Bay (Kalkbaai),
- Kalk Bay harbour, 34°07.698′S 18°26.986′E, a small commercial fishing harbour in Kalk bay, completely enclosing the tiny sandy beach,

=== Drainage ===
The characteristics of the rivers and wetlands of a region are a complex emergent product of the influences of geology, hydrology, ecology, and more recently, technology, over the long-term history of both the region and its surroundings. The rivers of the Cape Peninsula are generally steep and narrow following the current topography of the region. The current geomorphology determines the form and structure of catchments, and these in turn are determined by the past drainage patterns and geology of the surface at the time, the changes in climate and sea level, and the variations in altitude and slope caused by tectonic movement over the longer time-frame.

The courses of most of the rivers of the peninsula are controlled by the structural characteristics of the Table Mountain Group rocks. The major lineaments lie mostly northwest to southeast in the southern peninsula, and to the northeast in the northern peninsula.

Anticlockwise from the east side of Table Bay.

Rivers of the City Bowl:

- Capelsloot – a stream from the western slopes of Devil's Peak was diverted into a ditch to fill the moat round the Castle when it was first built. In 1905 it was combined with the Platteklip Stream in the storm-water system that drains into the harbour in Table Bay.
- Platteklip Stream – from Platteklip Gorge, canalised as the Heerengracht for irrigation and supply to a waterfront cistern, later diverted to into Capelsloot, which now flows through storm-water drains into Table Bay.
- Third Stream, Zwartrivier and Molenwater. Molenwater flows from springs in Oranjezicht, joined at the top of the Company Gardens by Third stream from the Waterhof and Leeuwenhof springs near Kloof Nek, and the Zwartrivier. They were canalised as the Buitengracht, and are now discharged as storm-water.

The Atlantic Seaboard:

- Diepsloot, at the north of Camps Bay, is joined by Camps Bay Stream shortly before it reaches the sea.
- Blinkwater Stream flows directly to the sea just south of Camps Bay.
- Kasteelpoort Stream flows directly to the sea just south of Bakoven.

Hout Bay Valley:

- The Hout Bay river starts as the Disa River on the Back Table near the top of Table Mountain and flows south over a series of waterfalls to the Orange Kloof The lower reaches are known as the Hout Bay River. Tributaries include Bokkermanskloof Stream and Baviaanskloof River. The river has a small estuary that opens in winter.

The Noordhoek Wetlands: The catchment areas to the north, east and to some extent the south discharge via poorly defined routes into a large wetland, the Papkuilsvlei, where there are three permanent bodies of water – Lake Michelle and the two Wildevoëlvleis.

- There are also two long, narrow, back lagoons at Noordhoek Beach
- The Bokramspruit flows into the sea near Kommetjie, at the southwest corner of the Noordhoek valley

The westward draining rivers of the Cape Point area: There are several seasonal streams, seeps, and vleis, most of which dry up in the summer. Perennial rivers include:

- Schusters River drains the Red Hill and Wildeschutzbrand areas inland of Scarborough, feeds a large wetland area in its lower reaches, and enters the sea via a small lagoon at the south side of Scarborough.
- Klaasjagters River drains the Swartkopberge and the area further west from Miller's Point. It flows south in the upper reaches the west until it reaches a fairly large lagoon north of Olifantsboschpunt, from which it drains to the sea. In the past it has also been known as Groote, Kromme, Krom, Hout and Smitswinkel River.
- The Krom River drains the western watershed of Paulsberg, and flows northwest across the Smitswinkelvlakte to join the Klaasjagters River

The eastward draining rivers of the Southern Peninsula: These rivers are generally fairly short and steep, and some, such as the Silvermine and Elsje rivers, have valley bottom wetlands at the coast.

- The Silvermine River, originally known as the Esselstein Rivier, drains the valley south of the Steenberg mountains and flows east across the Steenberg Plateau, then south through the Silvermine Valley before crossing the coastal Fish Hoek plain to False Bay at Clovelly on the north side of Fish Hoek Bay.
- Elsjes River flows from the Red Hill plateau to False Bay in the Glencairn valley.
- Klawersvlei River flows northwest from behind the mountains above Miller's Point over the plateau behind Simon's Town, before turning east over the escarpment and a high waterfall, entering the bay near the railway station.
- The Buffels River flows from a small spring to its mouth in Buffels Bay.

The Sandvlei catchment drains the east side of the mountains north of Muizenberg and south of the Liesbeek catcment into False Bay:

- Sandvlei (Zandvlei) is the largest of eight estuaries on the False Bay coastline, with an area of about 155 hectares. It is fed by the Westlake, Keysers and Sand rivers. The Diep River flows from the mountains above Constantia to Little Princessvlei, which is drained by the Sand River, which flows into the northeast of Sandvlei. The Westlake River, also known as the Steenberg or Raapkraal River, originates on the slopes of the Steenberg and flows through the Kirstenhof wetlands into the north west of Sandvlei, and the Keysers River and its tributaris, the Grootbosch, Spaanschemat and Prinseskasteel rivers rise on Constantiaberg. The upper reaches of the Spaanschemat River are known as the Glen Alpine Stream, which originates below Constantia Nek and is joined by the Eagles Nest Stream.

The Liesbeek Valley on the north-eastern side of Table Mountain drains the northeastern side of the mountains into table Bay:

- The Liesbeek river originates as the Vaalkat, Nursery and Skeleton streams, from the southern side of Window Buttress, which feed into the Protea Stream in Kirstenbosch, which is joined by the Window Stream from the north slopes of Window Buttress, and further along its course by the Hiddingh Stream, from near Maclear's Beacon. Various other tributories such as the Papenboom, Newlands, Albert and Mount Pleasant streams are piped into the Liesbeek via stormwater drains before it joins the Black River about two kilometres from Table Bay.

== Geology ==
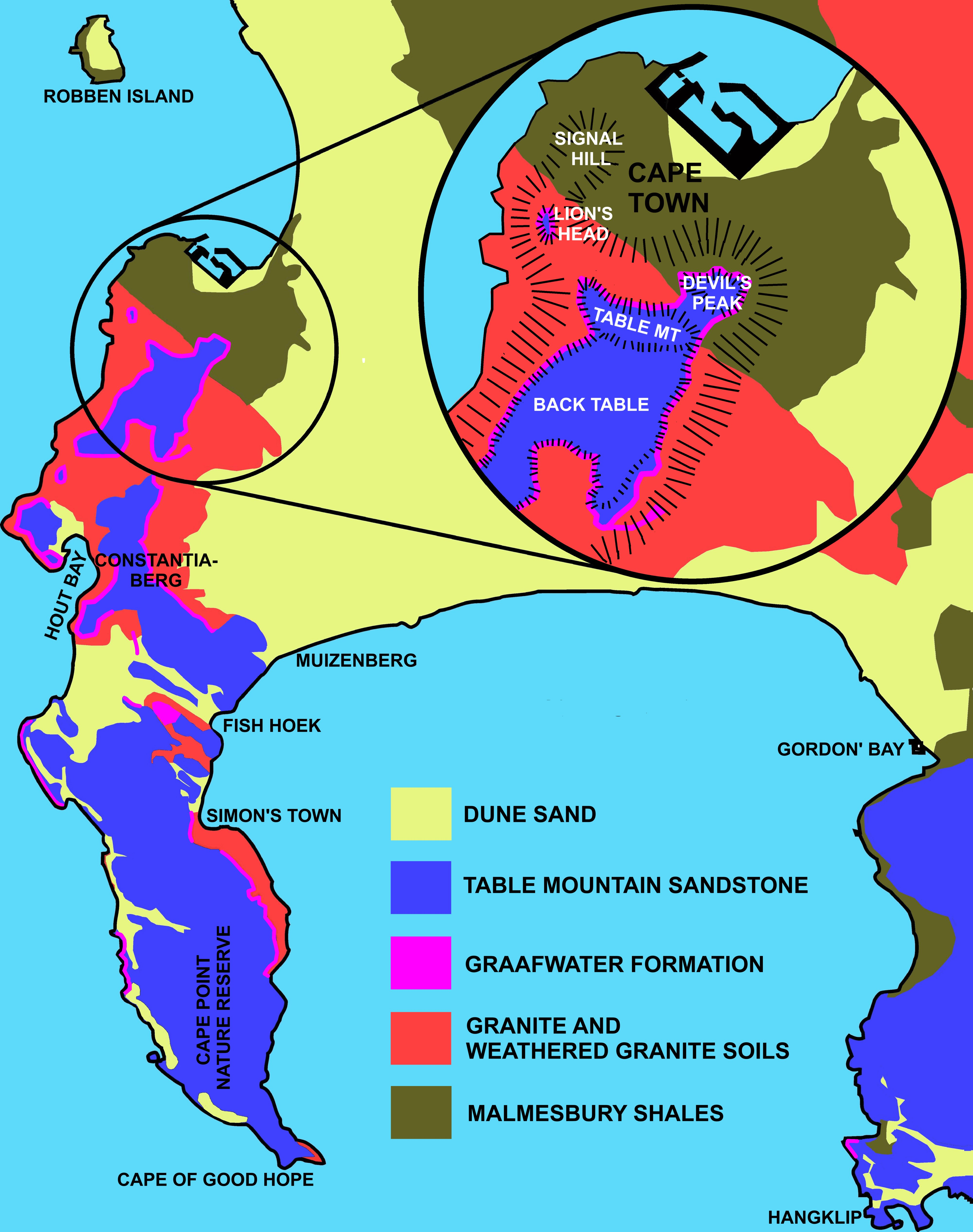
Geology of the Cape Peninsula, showing where the Malmesbury Group and Cape Granite rocks and weathered soils are exposed, and overlain by the Cape Supergroup. The hard, erosion resistant Cape Supergroup form the mountains of the Peninsula.

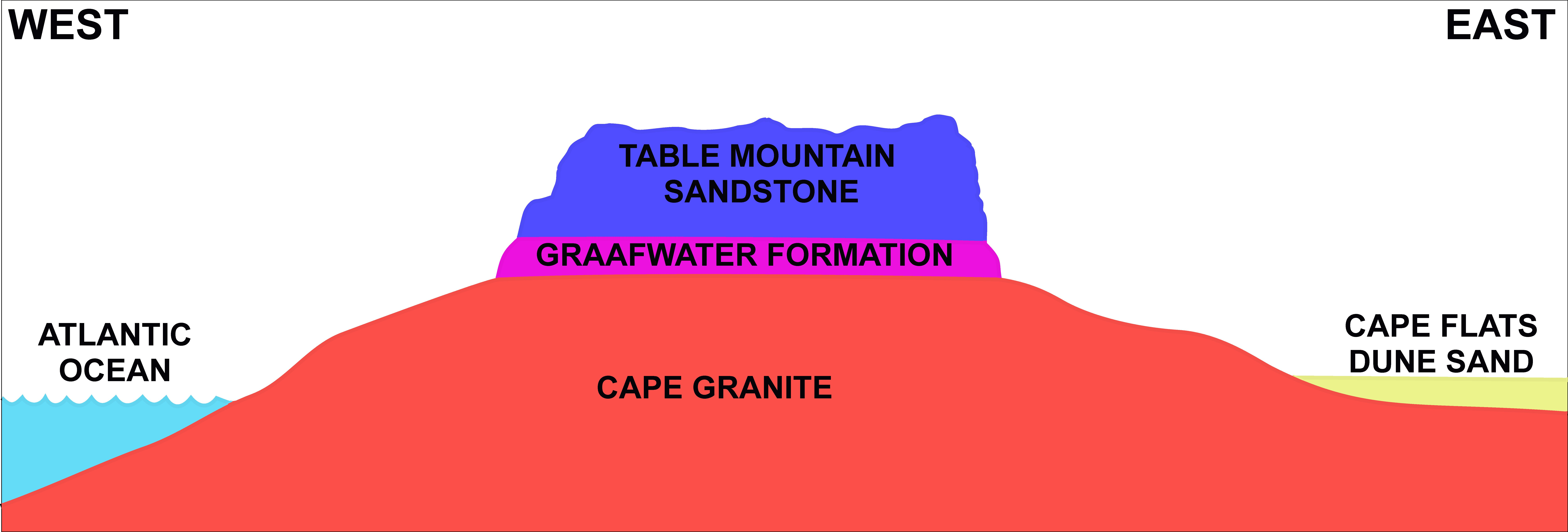
Schematic West-East geological cross section through the Cape Peninsula to illustrate its general structure. It closely resembles a W–E section through the Back Table, immediately south of Table Mountain, but is not to scale. The height of the "plateau" varies from 1000 m on Table Mountain, in the north, to about 150 m close to Cape Point, 50 km to the south. The colour-coding is the same as on the geological map on the left. Kirstenbosch Botanical Gardens, and all the major wines estates on the Peninsula are situated on the fertile (weathered) granite slopes on the east side of the mountain.

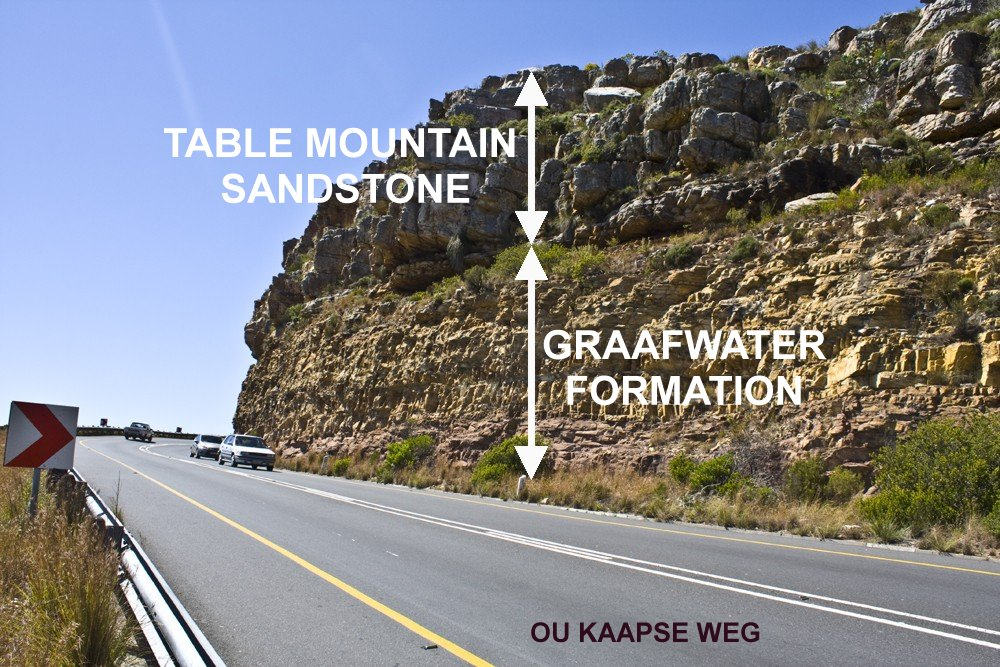
A view of the cutting at the second hairpin bend on Ou Kaapse Weg, as it winds on to the Silvermine Plateau. The transition between the lowermost layer of the Table Mountain Group on the Cape Peninsula - the Graafwater Formation - and the layer above it, the Table Mountain Sandstone or Peninsula Formation, can be clearly seen. The photograph was taken at an elevation of 250 m.

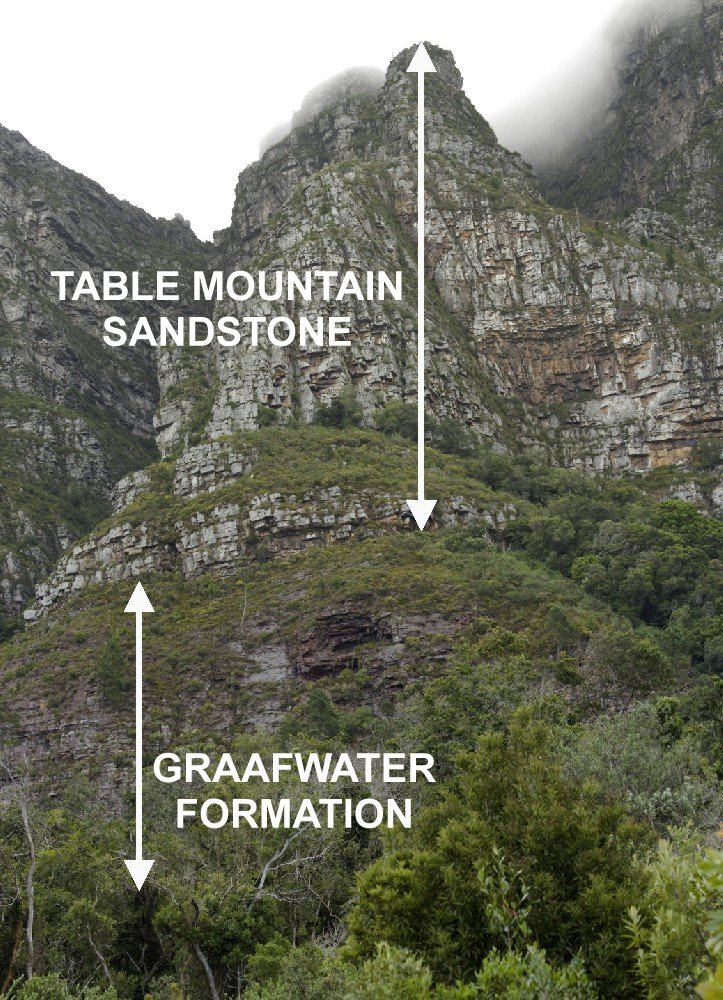
A view of the eastern crags (or cliffs) of Table Mountain and Devils Peak as seen from Newlands Forest, above the University of Cape Town. The two layers of the Table Mountain Group which are represented on the Cape Peninsula, namely the Graafwater Formation and the Table Mountain Sandstone or Peninsula Formation, can readily be distinguished. The remaining layer, the Pakhuis Formation, occurs as a tiny remnant at Maclear's Beacon on the top of Table Mountain, not visible in the photograph. The granite basement on which the Table Mountain Group rests on the Cape Peninsula is obscured by the forest in the foreground.

A west-east (left to right) geological cross section through Table Mountain on the Cape Peninsula, the Cape Flats (the isthmus connecting the Peninsula to the African mainland) and the Hottentots Holland Mountains on the mainland. It indicates how the Cape Fold Mountains have been eroded in this region, leaving what was once the bottom of a valley to form Table Mountain with its flat table-top structure.

The Cape Peninsula is underlain by the oldest rocks in the area, the Malmesbury Group, and the granite intrusions of the Peninsula pluton.

The Malmesbury Group has been dated from between 830 and 980 Mya, and was deformed during the Saldanian orogenic cycle, both before and during the granite intrusions of 630 to 500 Mya, and there are minor intrusions which precede the granite. The base of this group has not been exposed. The basal rocks were eroded to a relatively featureless peneplain with exposed granites covering most of the peninsula south of Lion's Head and Devil's Peak. The Sea-Point contact zone, described by Charles Darwin is a well known region of metamorphic rocks formed by the granite intrusion into the Malmesbury rocks.

These rocks were later unconformably covered by the Cape Supergroup, which is divided into eight formations, the three oldest of which are present on the Peninsula. The lowest present is the reddish Graafwater formation which consist of shales and sandstone. The Graafwater Formation can be clearly seen in the cutting on the second hairpin bend as the Ou Kaapse Weg (road) goes up the slope from Westlake on to the Silvermine plateau. In the cutting one can also see the abrupt and obvious transition into the Table Mountain Sandstone (or, as it is currently known, the Peninsula Formation Sandstone) above it. Looking up the slope from below to the first hairpin bend, the granite basement on which the Graafwater formation rests is visible. And in the cutting at the first hairpin bend, the ocher-colored, gritty clay into which the granite weathers is clearly displayed. The relatively thin Graafwater layer (no more than about 60–70 m thick on the Cape Peninsula) is overlain by the prominent Peninsula Formation, which consists mainly of hard, erosion resistant, quartzitic sandstones, which form the high, prominent, almost vertical cliffs of the Cape Peninsula. At the very top of Table Mountain, at Maclear's Beacon, is a small remnant of the Pakhuis Diamictites, better represented in the Cederberg Mountains, 200 km to the north of Cape Town.

=== Soils ===
The soils of the Cape Peninsula are similar to those of other parts of the Cape Fold Belt, being derived from similar rock, and are mainly sandy and poor in nutrients. The poorest soils are those associated with the sandstone plateaux and upper slopes, which are grey, acidic, leached and generally shallow. They are mostly well drained, but there are areas of poor drainage on the relatively level plateaux and high ground which get winter rains and south-Easter cloud precipitation in summer, which are very acidic and have a high content of organic matter. The deeper soils of the colluvial slopes which are underlain by shale or granite tend to be heavier, orange to red, less acid and richer in nutrients. Soils associated with older Quaternary deposits tend to be fairly deep, moderately acid and more fertile than the soils derived from the sandstones. Younger sands along the coastline are alkaline and poorly consolidated.

== Oceanography ==
The Cape of Good Hope is sometimes erroneously identified as the meeting point of the Atlantic and Indian Oceans. However, according to the International Hydrographic Organization agreement that defines the ocean boundaries, the meeting point is at Cape Agulhas, about 200 kilometres (120 mi) to the southeast and the most southerly tip of the African continent. The west coast of the Peninsula is referred to as the "Atlantic Coast" or "Atlantic Seaboard", but the eastern side is generally known as the "False Bay Coast".

Similarly, Cape Point is not the fixed "meeting point" of the cold Benguela Current, running northwards along the west coast of Africa, and the warm Agulhas Current, running south from the equatorial region along the east coast of Africa. In fact the south flowing Agulhas Current swings away from the African coastline between about East London and Port Elizabeth, following the edge of the Continental shelf roughly as far as the southern tip of the Agulhas Bank, 250 km (155 miles) south of Cape Agulhas. From there it is retroflexed (turned sharply round) in an easterly direction by the South Atlantic, South Indian and Southern Ocean currents, known collectively as the "West Wind Drift", which flow eastwards round Antarctica. The Benguela Current, on the other hand, is an upwelling current which brings cold, mineral-rich water from the depths of the Atlantic Ocean to the surface along the west coast of southern Africa. Having reached the surface it flows northwards as a result of the prevailing wind and Coriolis forces. The Benguela Current, therefore, effectively starts at Cape Point, and flows northwards from there, although further out to sea it is joined by surface water that has crossed the South Atlantic from South America as part of the South Atlantic Gyre. Thus the Benguela and Agulhas currents do not strictly "meet" anywhere, although eddies from the Agulhas current do from time to time round the Cape to join the Benguela Current.

Tidal range is moderate, with about 1.8 to 1.9 m range at spring tide on both sides of the peninsula, and tidal currents are negligible.

=== Bathymetry ===
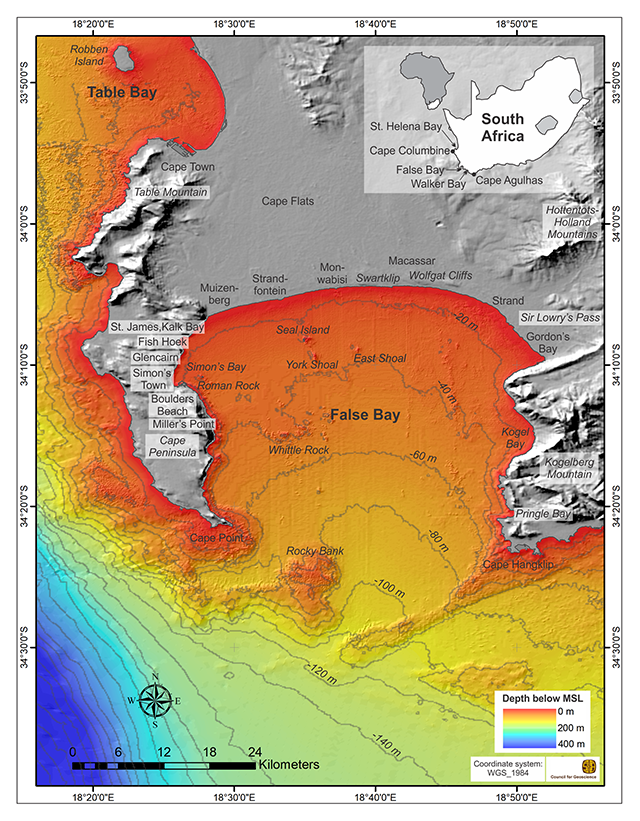
Bathymetry of False Bay and the Cape Peninsula

The Bathymetry of False Bay differs in character from the west side of the Cape Peninsula. The west coast seabed tends to slope down more steeply than in False Bay, and although the close inshore waters are also shallow, the 100 m contour is mostly within about 10 km of the west coast, while the entire False Bay is shallower than about 80 m. The bottom of False Bay slopes down relatively gradually from the gently sloping beaches of the north shore to the mouth, and is fairly even in depth from east to west except close to the shorelines.

=== Navigational hazards ===
- Albatross Rock 34°16.527′S 18°22.210′E
- Anvil Rock 34°22.218′S 18°31.090′E
- Batsata Rock
- Bellows Rock 34°23.375′S 18°29.425′E
- Cape Point
- Roman Rock
- Vulcan Rock

== Climate ==
Much of the Western Cape has a Mediterranean climate type, with warm, dry summers and cool, wet winters. The winter rain is a consequence of frontal depressions developed from the circumpolar westerlies, which occur at least once per week in normal mid-winter from June to August. The summer climate is controlled by the South Atlantic High, which produces south-easterly winds, which blow offshore over the west coast. Much of the roughly 25% of the peninsula's rain that falls during the summer months of October to March is associated with post-frontal conditions.

There is a large variation in rainfall over the peninsula. Maclear's beacon at the top of Table mountain in the north has an average of 2270 mm per year, while Cape Point gets about 402 mm per year. 1

Annual Rainfall
Region	Average annual rainfall
Table Mountain	1000–2000 mm
City bowl	600–800 mm
Southern suburbs	1000–1500 mm
Cape Flats	500–600 mm
Southern peninsula	400–700 mm

Rainfall variations are affected by altitude and aspect, and by topographical features that direct and trap rain-bearing wind. Rain from southeasterly wind clouds is substantial at higher elevations. Snowfall is unusual, restricted to Table Mountain, and melts within a day or two.

Variations in temperature are not great due to the moderating effect of the adjacent sea, the narrow land mass, and fairly low maximum altitudes of the mountains. Annual mean temperature at sea level in the north facing areas of the north peninsula are around 22 °C. and about 16 °C on the mountain top. Elsewhere, averages range between 18 and 20 °C. The range of mean maximum to mean minimum temperatures at any given place is small, ranging from 10 °C on table Mountain to 6 °C at Cape Point. Frost is unusual and not severe, even on the mountains, and is unknown at the coastline.

Winds over the peninsula can be strong. In winter, the northwesterly wind often exceeds gale force, with mean wind speeds of 20kph over the Cape Flats and 30kph at Cape Point. In summer the southeasterly and southwesterly winds may blow at gale force for over a week uninterrupted, but there are locally sheltered areas where the wind is much lighter which vary depending on wind direction.

== Ecology ==
The peninsula is highly topographically varied, and has a wide range of annual rainfall variation over a small area, and a large diversity of nutrient poor soils, and consequently supports a wide range of habitats and ecological communities. The peninsula lies within the Cape Floristic Region of South Africa. It is the home of some 2285 plant species and is a global hot-spot of diversity for plants and invertebrates. Vegetation is dominated by about 12 types of fire-prone fynbos shrubland. Invertebrate community structure is poorly understood, and vertebrate communities are thought to be strongly influenced by recurring fire and nutrient limitations, so most vertebrates are small and population densities are low.

Table Mountain National Park, previously known as the Cape Peninsula National Park, was proclaimed on 29 May 1998, for the purpose of protecting the natural environment of the Table Mountain Chain, and in particular the rare fynbos vegetation. The park comprises a large part of the undeveloped area of the Cape Peninsula, and is managed by South African National Parks Board. The coastal waters surrounding the Cape Peninsula were proclaimed as a marine protected area in 2004, include several no-take zones, and are part of the national park. The waters of this marine protected area are unusual in that they are parts of two fairly distinct coastal marine ecoregions, namely the Agulhas ecoregion and the Benguela ecoregion. The boundary is at Cape Point.

=== Flora ===
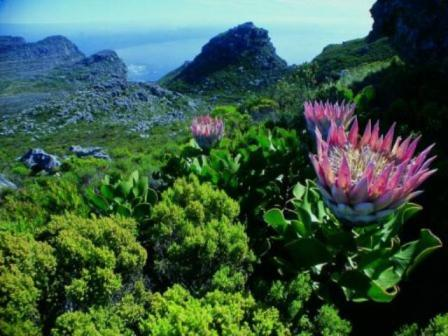
A king protea growing in Peninsula Sandstone Fynbos on Table Mountain

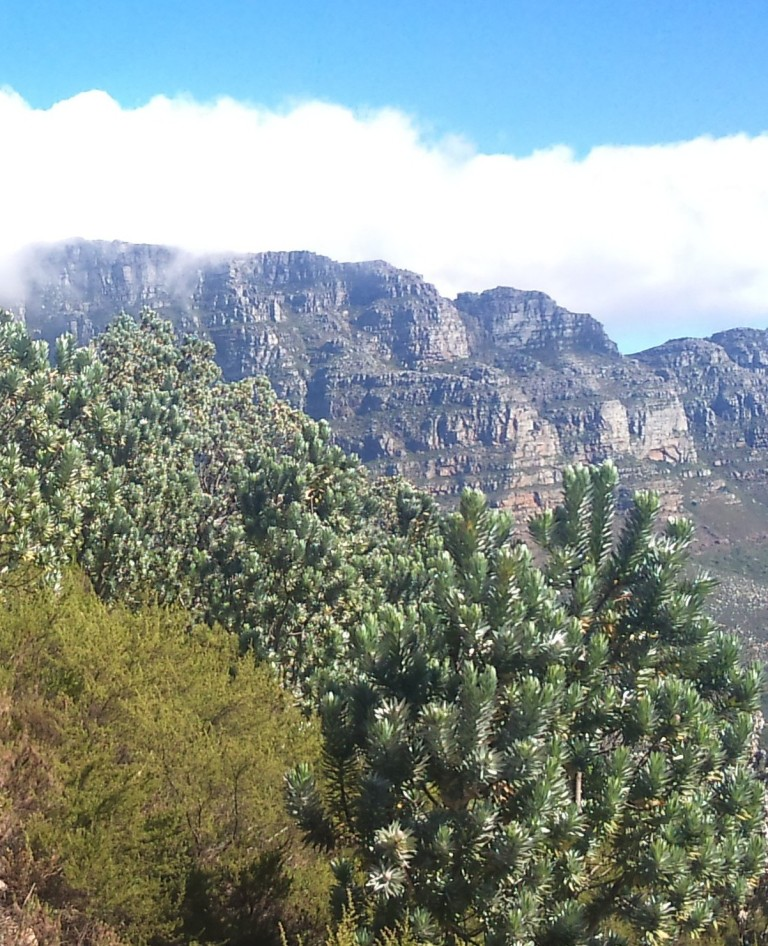
Silver trees (Leucadendron argenteum) only occur naturally on the granite and clay soils of the Cape Peninsula, surrounding Table Mountain and the Back Table. A few tiny patches, possibly planted there by early European settlers, occur near Stellenbosch, Paarl and Somerset West. This photo was taken on Lion's Head, looking towards the Twelve Apostles.

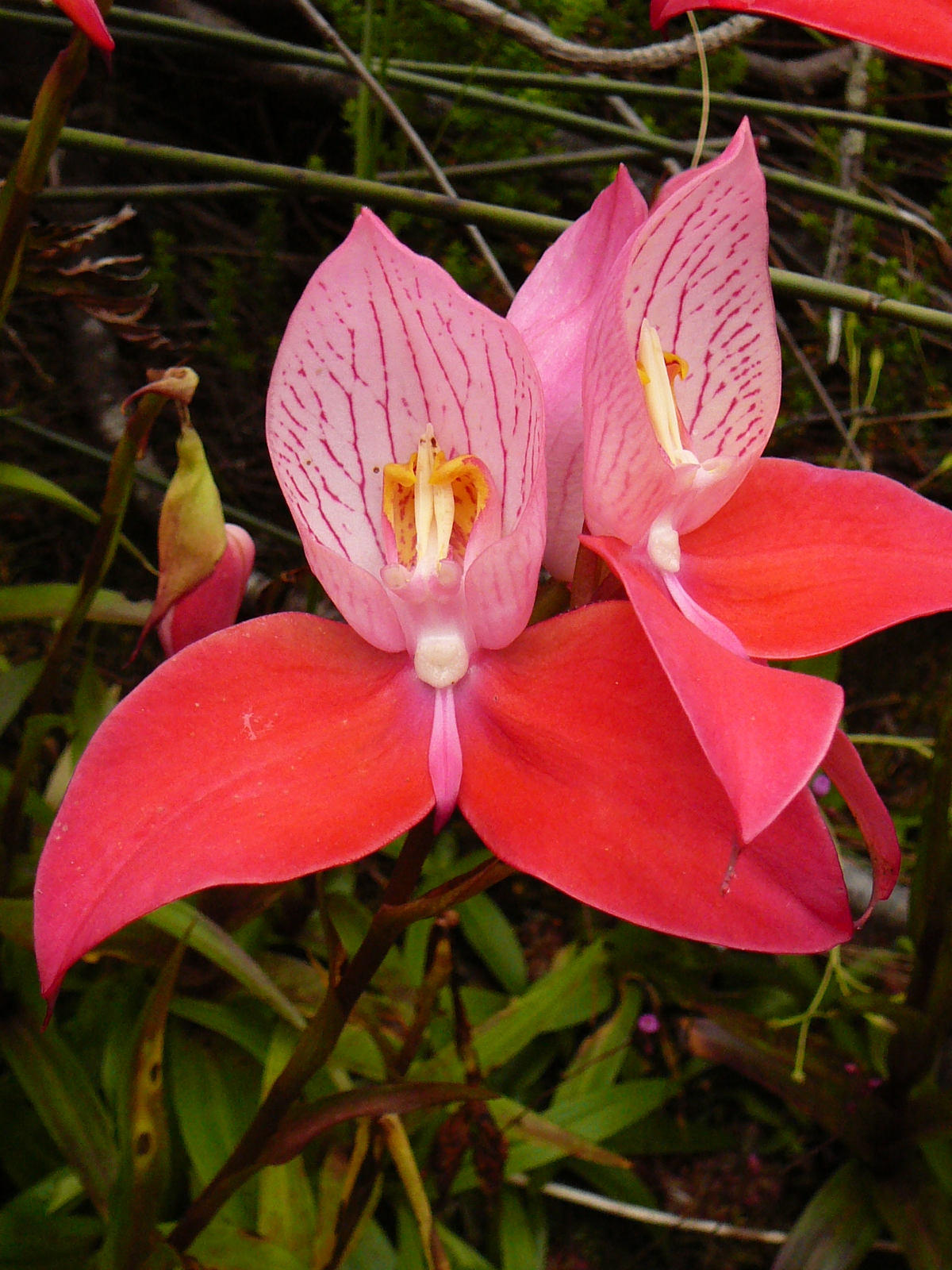
The Disa uniflora, also known as the Pride of Table Mountain, is a showy orchid that blooms under waterfalls, along streamlets and seeps on the top and upper slopes of Table Mountain and the Back Table, in January–March.

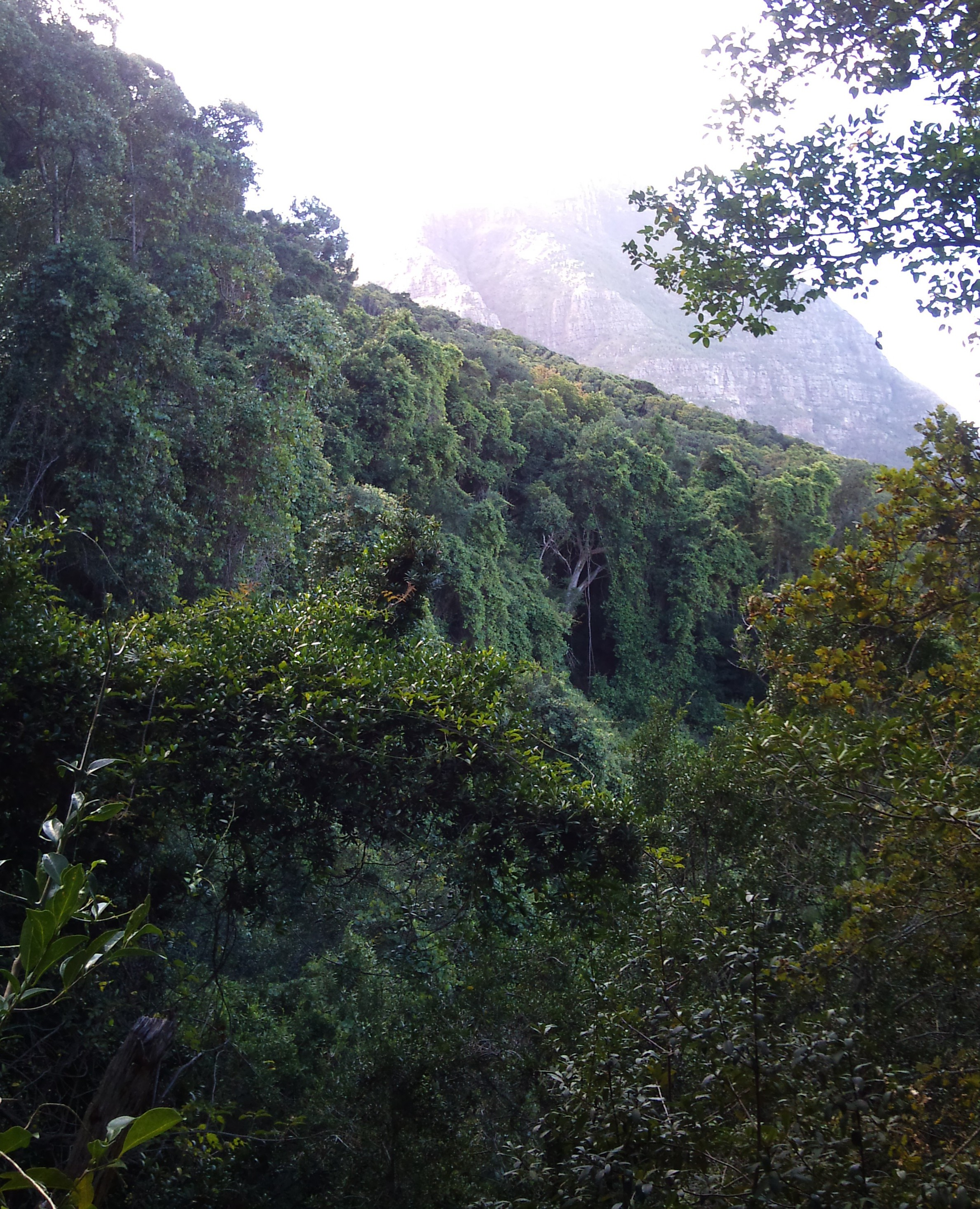
Indigenous forest on Table Mountain, with Devil's Peak visible in the distance

The Cape Peninsula has an unusually rich biodiversity. Its vegetation consists predominantly of several different types of the unique and rich Cape Fynbos. The main vegetation type is endangered Peninsula Sandstone Fynbos, but critically endangered Peninsula Granite Fynbos, Peninsula Shale Renosterveld and Afromontane forest occur in smaller portions on the mountain ranges of the Peninsula. On the sandy Cape Flats lowlands there are a few pockets of protected Cape Flats Sand Fynbos.

The Peninsula's vegetation types form part of the Cape Floral Region protected areas. These protected areas are a World Heritage Site, and an estimated 2,200 species of plants are confined to Table Mountain range - which are at least as many as occur in the whole of the United Kingdom. Many of these species, including a great many types of proteas, are endemic to these mountains and can be found nowhere else. The Disa uniflora, despite its restricted range within the Western Cape, is relatively common in the perennially wet areas (waterfalls, streamlets and seeps) on Table Mountain and the Back Table, but hardly anywhere else on the Cape Peninsula. It is a very showy orchid that blooms from January to March on the Table Mountain Sandstone regions of the mountain. Although they are quite widespread on the Back Table, the best (most certain, and close-up) place to view these beautiful blooms is in the "Aqueduct" off the Smuts Track, halfway between Skeleton Gorge and Maclear's Beacon.

Remnant patches of indigenous forest persist in the wetter ravines. However, much of the indigenous forest was felled by the early European settlers for fuel for the lime kilns needed during the construction of the Castle. The exact extent of the original forests is unknown, though most of it was probably along the eastern slopes of Devil's Peak, Table Mountain and the Back Table where names such as Rondebosch, Kirstenbosch, Klaassenbosch and Witteboomen survive (in Dutch "bosch" means forest; and "boomen" means trees). Hout Bay (in Dutch "hout" means wood) was another source of timber and fuel as the name suggests. In the early 1900s commercial pine plantations were planted on these slopes all the way from the Constantiaberg to the front of Devil's Peak, and even on top of the mountains, but these have now been largely cleared allowing fynbos to flourish in the regions where the indigenous Afromontane forests have not survived, or never existed.

Fynbos is a fire adapted vegetation, and evidence suggests that in the absence of regular fires all but the drier fynbos would become dominated by trees. Regular fires have dominated fynbos for at least the past 12 000 years largely as a result of human activity. In 1495 Vasco da Gama named the South African coastline Terra de Fume because of the smoke he saw from numerous fires. This was originally probably to maintain a productive stock of edible bulbs (especially watsonians) and to facilitate hunting, and later, after the arrival of pastoralists, to provide fresh grazing after the rains. Thus the plants that make up fynbos today are those that have been subjected to a variety of fire regimes over a very long period, and their preservation now requires regular burning. The frequency of the fires obviously determines precisely which mix of plants will dominate any particular region, but intervals of 10–15 years between fires are considered to promote the proliferation of the larger Protea species, a rare local colony of which, the Aulax umbellata (Family: Proteaceae), was wiped out on the Peninsula by more frequent fires, as have been the silky-haired pincushion, Leucospermum vestitum, the red sugarbush, Protea grandiceps and Burchell's sugarbush, Protea burchellii, although a stand of a dozen or so plants has recently been "rediscovered" in the saddle between Table Mountain and Devil's Peak. Some bulbs may similarly have become extinct as a result of a too rapid sequence of fires. The fires that occur on the mountains today are still largely due to unregulated human activity. Fire frequency is therefore a matter of chance rather than conservation.

Despite intensive conservation efforts the Table Mountain range has the highest concentration of threatened species of any continental area of equivalent size in the world. The non-urban areas of the Cape Peninsula (mainly on the mountains and mountain slopes) have suffered particularly under a massive onslaught of invasive alien plants for well over a century, with perhaps the worst invader being the cluster pine, partly because it was planted in extensive commercial plantations along the eastern slopes of the mountains, north of Muizenberg. Considerable efforts have been made to control the rapid spread of these invasive alien trees. Other invasive plants include black wattle, blackwood, Port Jackson and rooikrans (All Australian members of the acacia family), as well as several Hakea species and bramble.

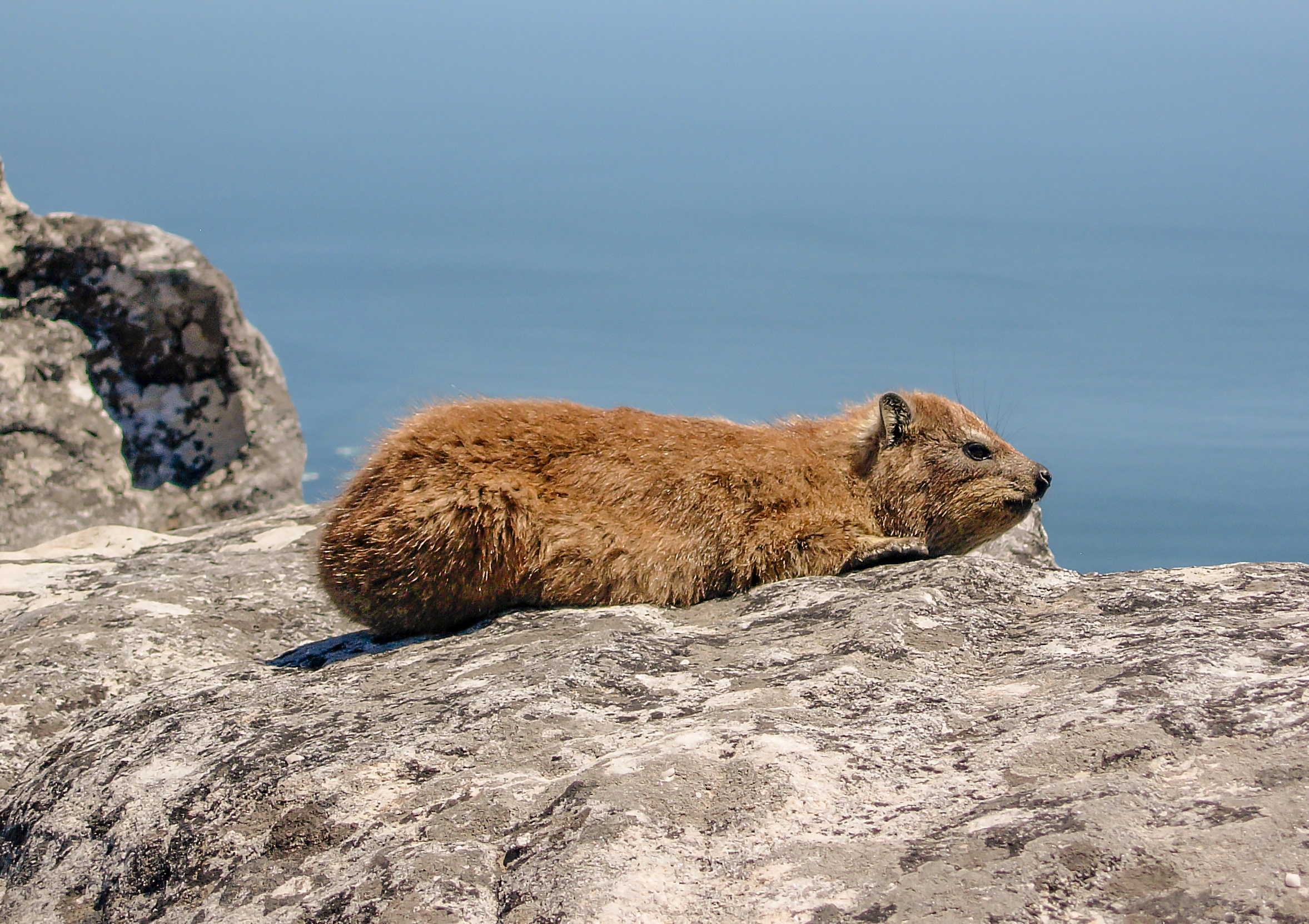
The Cape hyrax or "dassie" as it is known in South Africa. It is the Verreaux's eagle's favourite and almost exclusive prey on the Cape Peninsula.

==== Floral diversity ====
The flora is typical of the southwestern Cape Floristic Region. The five largest families are Asteraceae (286 spp. of which 47 are in Senecio), Iridaceae (168 spp.), Fabaceae (162 spp. of which 55 are in Aspalathus), Poaceae (141 spp.), and Ericaceae (112 spp. of which 103 are in Erica). There are also 38 spp. in Oxalis (Oxalidaceae), and 37 spp. in Ficinia (Cyperaceae). The flora includes species typical of the strictly winter rainfall area of the Western Cape, but also species with a range extending into areas where more rain falls in summer.

==== Vegetation types ====
Three major plant formations are present on the peninsula: Cape Fynbos Shrublands, Renosterveld Shrublands and associated grasslands, and Forest and thicket. Fynbos has the largest coverage, historically about 92% of the area, and hosts the majority of species. It is a fire-prone sclerophyllous shrubland with a high cover of restiods. Renosterveld is also a fire-prone scrubland, but with restioids replaced by grasses, without proteoid shrubs, and with the shrub component dominated by ericoid shrubs. The third formation is Forest and thicket, which is characterised by broad-leafed, Afromontane evergreen trees and shrubs, and is not fire-prone. It grows in a variety of habitats, mostly in moist, relatively fertile soils that are protected from fire. Species diversity is relatively low.

Fynbos:

- Dune asteraceous fynbos
- Coastal scree asteraceous fynbos
- Ericaceous fynbos
- Mesic mesotrophic proteoid fynbos
- Wet mesotrophic proteoid fynbos
- Mesic oligotrophic proteoid fynbos
- Wet oligotrophic proteoid fynbos
- Sandplain proteoid fynbos
- Upland restioid fynbos
- Wet restioid fynbos
- Undifferentiated cliff communities

Other:

- Renosterveld and grassland
- Wetland
- Vleis
- Forest and thicket

=== Fauna ===
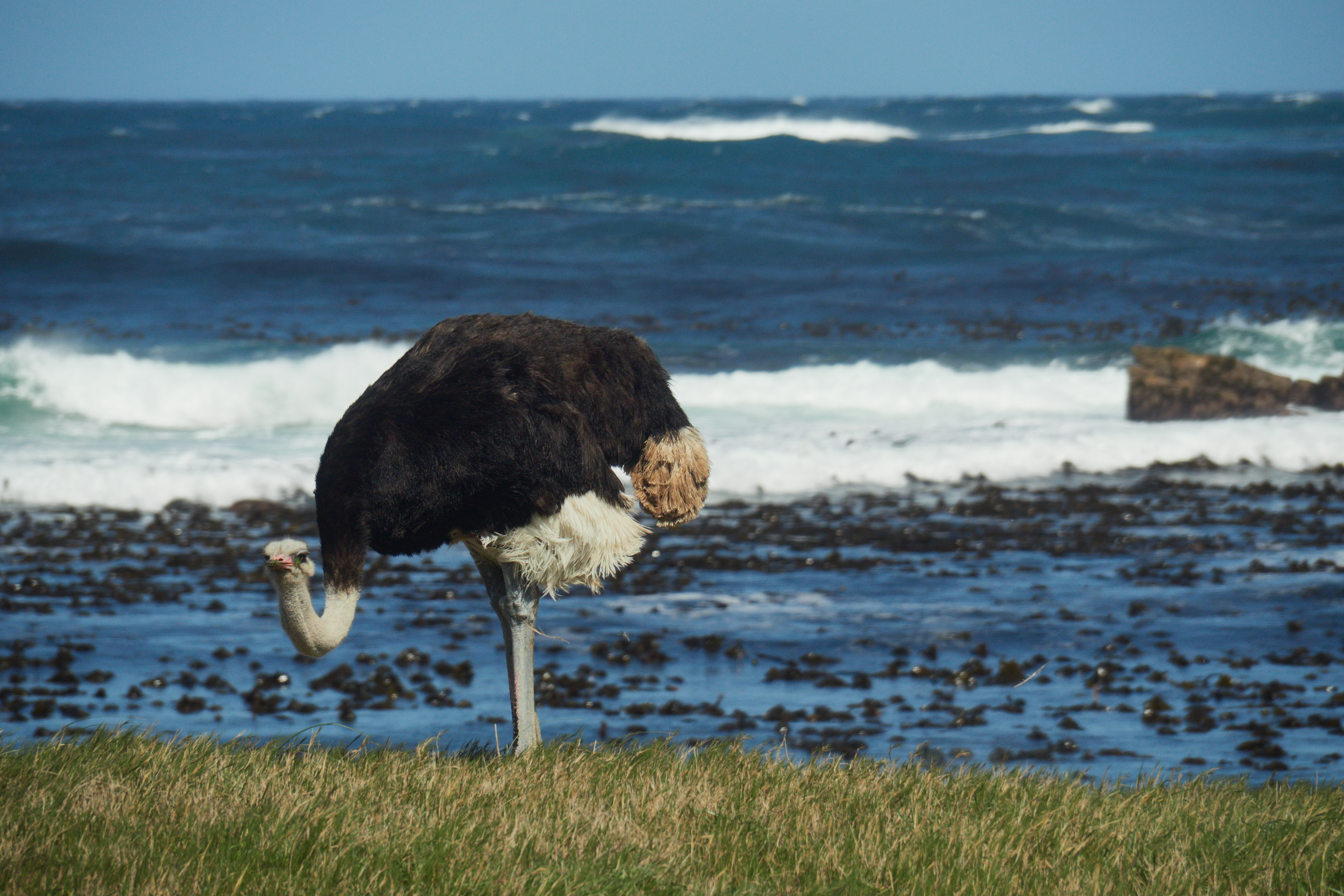
An ostrich at the edge of the Cape Peninsula coastline.

The most common mammal on the mountain was the dassie (the South African name, from Afrikaans, pronounced "dussy"), or rock hyrax. Between about 2000 and 2004 (no one is certain about the exact year or years) their numbers suddenly plummeted for unknown reasons. They used to cluster around the restaurant at the upper cable station, near areas where tourists discarded or (inadvisably supplied) food. The population crash of the dassies was in all probability responsible for the decline in the Verreaux's eagle population on the Peninsula, which is believed to have consisted of 3 breeding pairs during the period 1950 to 1990, with only 2 pairs, maximally, ever having been reported to fledge a chick each in any given year. With the commencement of formal monitoring in 1993, two breeding pairs were recorded on the Cape Peninsula Mountain Chain in 2004: one below the upper cable station at the western end of Table Mountain, in Blinkwater Ravine, the other on the cliffs below Noordhoek Peak. The nest near the cable station was abandoned in 2006, leaving only the Noordhoek pair, which continued to fledge chicks reasonably regularly till 2013, at which point one member of the pair disappeared. From 2013 till January 2017 only a single Verreaux's Eagle, presumed to be a female, remained on the Peninsula. She continued to maintain the nest under Noordhoek Peak, but seemed unable to attract a mate. But in early 2017 a pair of eagles was seen by at least 7 independent observers during the course of 10 days (27 January - 5 February). It remains to be seen whether they will breed later in the year. Dassies are an important part the Verreaux's eagle's prey on the Peninsula. (Note: In 2011-2012 dassies began to be seen in Bakoven, on the Atlantic coast, below the Twelve Apostles Mountains. They were then seen in the Silvermine region of the Table Mountain National Park, and in 2015 at the restaurant on the top of the western end of Table Mountain, as well as elsewhere in the mountains. But even in 2017 dassies are still not as abundant as they were on the Peninsula Mountain Chain in the 1990s.)

Table Mountain is also home to porcupines, mongooses, snakes, lizards, tortoises, and a rare endemic species of amphibian that is only found on Table Mountain, the Table Mountain ghost frog. The last lion in the area was shot circa 1802. Leopards persisted on the mountains until perhaps the 1920s but are now extinct locally. Two smaller, secretive, nocturnal carnivores, the rooikat (caracal) and the vaalboskat (also called the vaalkat or Southern African wildcat) were once common in the mountains and the mountain slopes. The rooikat continues to be seen on rare occasions by mountaineers but the status of the vaalboskat is uncertain. The mountain cliffs are home to several raptors species, apart from the Verreaux's eagle. They include the jackal buzzard, booted eagle (in summer), African harrier-hawk, peregrine falcon and the rock kestrel. In 2014 three pairs of African fish eagles were believed to be breeding on the Peninsula, but they nest in trees generally as far away from human habitation as is possible on the Peninsula. Their number in 2017 is unknown.

Up until the late 1990s baboons occurred on all the mountains of the Peninsula, including the Back Table immediately behind Table Mountain. Since then they have abandoned Table Mountain and the Back Table, and only occur on the Constantiaberg, and the mountains to the south. They have also abandoned the tops of many of the mountains, in favour of the lower slopes, particularly when these were covered in pine plantations which seemed to provide them with more, or higher quality food than the fynbos on the mountain tops. However these new haunts are also within easy reach of Cape Town's suburbs, which brings them into conflict with humans and dogs, and the risk of traffic accidents. In 2014 there were a dozen troops on the Peninsula, varying in size from 7 to over 100 individuals, scattered on the mountains from the Constantiaberg to Cape Point. The baboon troops are the subject of intense research into their movements (both of individuals and of the troops), their physiology, genetics, social interactions and habits. In addition, their sleeping sites are noted each evening, so that monitors armed with paint ball guns can stay with the troop all day, to ward them off from wandering into the suburbs. From when this initiative was started in 2009 the number of baboons on the Peninsula has increased from 350 to 450, and the number of baboons killed or injured by residents has decreased.

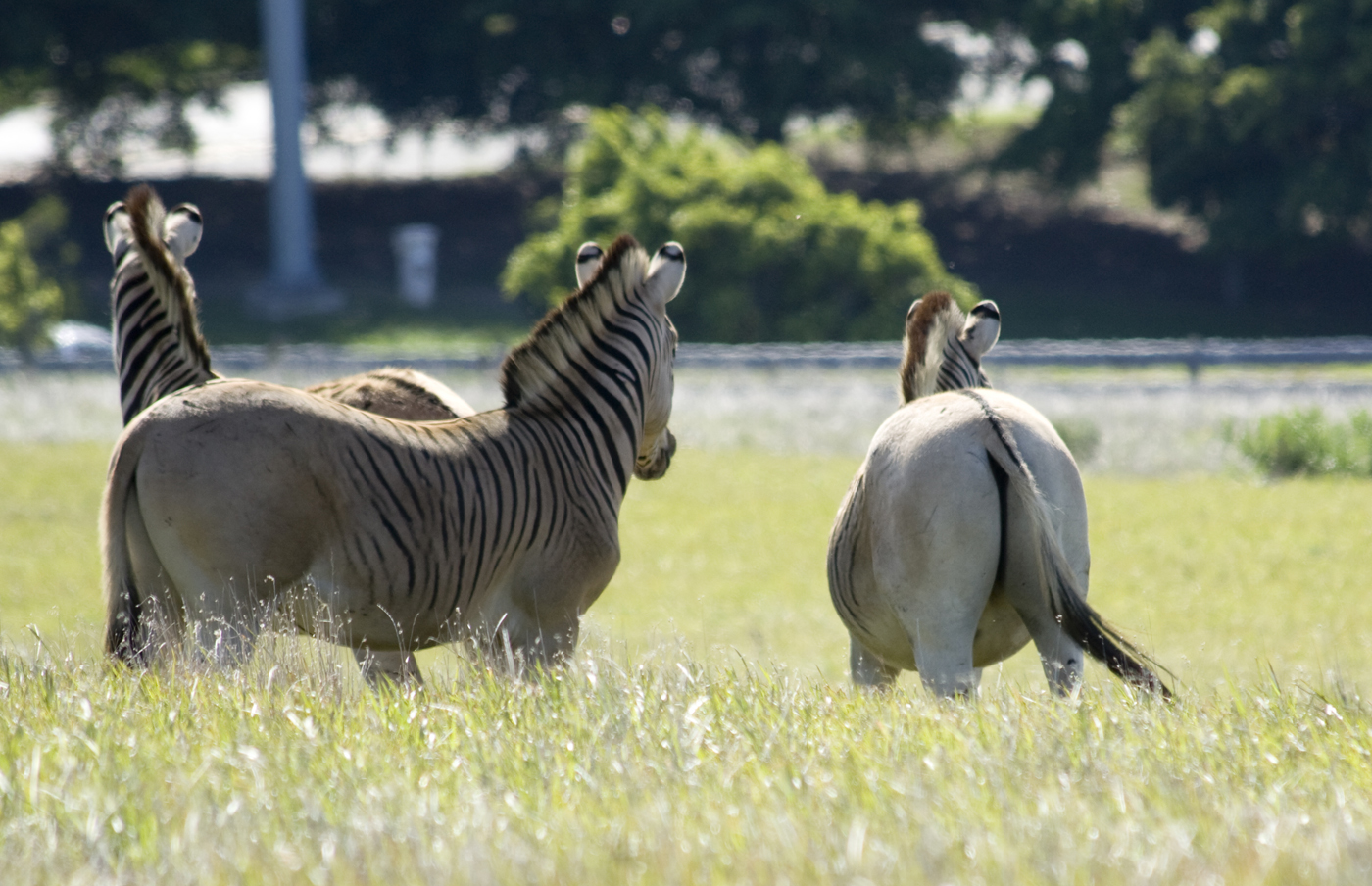
Rau quagga in the animal camp on the slopes of Devil's Peak, above Groote Schuur Hospital.

Himalayan tahrs, fugitive descendants of tahrs that escaped from Groote Schuur Zoo near the University of Cape Town, in 1936, used to be common on the less accessible upper parts of the mountain. As an exotic species, they were almost eradicated through a culling programme initiated by the South African National Parks to make way for the reintroduction of indigenous klipspringers. Until recently there were also small numbers of fallow deer of European origin and sambar deer from southeast Asia. These were mainly in the Rhodes Memorial area but during the 1960s they could be found as far afield as Signal Hill. These animals may still be seen occasionally despite efforts to eliminate or relocate them.

On the lower slopes of Devil's Peak, above Groote Schuur Hospital, an animal camp bequeathed to the City of Cape Town by Cecil John Rhodes has been used in recent years as part of the Quagga Project. The quaggas used to roam the Cape Peninsula, the Karoo and the Free State in large numbers, but were hunted to extinction during the early 1800s. The last quagga died in an Amsterdam zoo in 1883. In 1987 a project was launched by Reinhold Rau to back-breed the quagga, after it had been established, using mitochondrial DNA obtained from museum specimens, that the quagga was closely related to the plains zebra, and on 20 January 2005 a foal considered to be the first quagga-like individual because of a visible reduced striping was born. These quagga-like zebras are officially known as Rau quaggas, as no one can be certain that they are anything more than quagga look-alikes. The animal camp above Groote Schuur Hospital has several good looking Rau quaggas, but they are unfortunately not easily seen except from within the game camp, which is quite large and undulating, and the animals are few. The animal camp is not open to the public.

== Human impact ==
The nutritionally impoverished soils of the Cape Peninsula limited pre-colonial animal numbers, and thereby also the density of human settlement it could support, but there has been hunter-gatherer human occupation going back more than 200,000 years, The early San occupants used 'firestick farming' to manage the natural vegetation for game and geophytes. These long term practices are thought to have influenced the development of fynbos in areas where thickets would likely be the dominant vegetation community, and encouraged greater floral biodiversity. About 2000 years ago the San were displaced by Khoikhoi who were mainly nomadic pastoralists who kept fairly large numbers of sheep and cattle at lowland sites in the central and northern peninsula during the dry season.

Colonisation by the Dutch had an immediate transformative effect on the lower altitude ecosystems of the northern peninsula when agriculture was introduced, and rapidly expanded between Table Bay and Wynberg. The forests of the lower slopes and flats of the eastern side of Table Mountain and the Hout Bay valley were soon depleted. Alien replacements, largely oaks and pines, were introduced from Holland to replace the natural forests, since about 1655. Dutch expansion into the south peninsula was slow, partly due to difficult access, but was encouraged by the use of Simon's Bay as a winter anchorage from 1743, as Table Bay is exposed to the north-westerly storms, which drove many ships aground. Farms in this area granted to 'free burghers' were largely used for hunting and limited market gardening. The expanding colony and a smallpox epidemic led to the social and economic collapse of the Khoikhoi by 1713.

Liberalisation of trade following the second British capture of the Cape Colony in 1806 led to rapid growth of the population of the peninsula. By this time the population of the greater Cape Town area reached about 22,000 settlers, 25,000 slaves and remaining Khoikhoi. The arrival of the 1820 Settlers increased the population of European descent to about 47,000. The British made Simon's Town an official naval base, and this encouraged the growth of transport and other infrastructure in the area. Simon's Town flourished during the Anglo-Boer wars, and the two world wars, but agriculture in the peninsula remained limited by terrain and soils. Most of the produce supplied to the visiting ships came from the Cape Flats and beyond.

Extensive plantations of fast growing alien trees were established during the mid to late 19th century on the slopes of the central Peninsula and Table Mountain (mostly pines and eucalypts), and on the sands of the Cape Flats (mostly Australian acacias). These lead to alien plant invasions which threaten the remaining natural ecosystems of the peninsula. Urban areas also expanded along the eastern slopes of Table Mountain, and later along the smaller wastern slopes, into the Cape Flats, and along the east coast of the south peninsula from Muizenberg to Simon's Town.

Cape Town grew rapidly during the 20th century: By the 1960s the population reached half a million, In the late 1980s discriminatory legislation was relaxed and a large influx of rural people moved in and started informal settlements on open ground. By 1994 it had increased to 2.2 million, and by 2020 it was over 4 million. This rapid growth increased pressures on the natural ecosystems, particularly where land supporting natural ecosystems was occupied.

In 1996 about 37% of the region was in use for agriculture and urbanization and 44% of the remaining area of natural vegetation had been invaded by alien plants. However, about 64% of the peninsula was within the Cape Peninsula Protected Natural Environment which includes three major nature reserves, and which was later proclaimed as the Table Mountain National Park.
