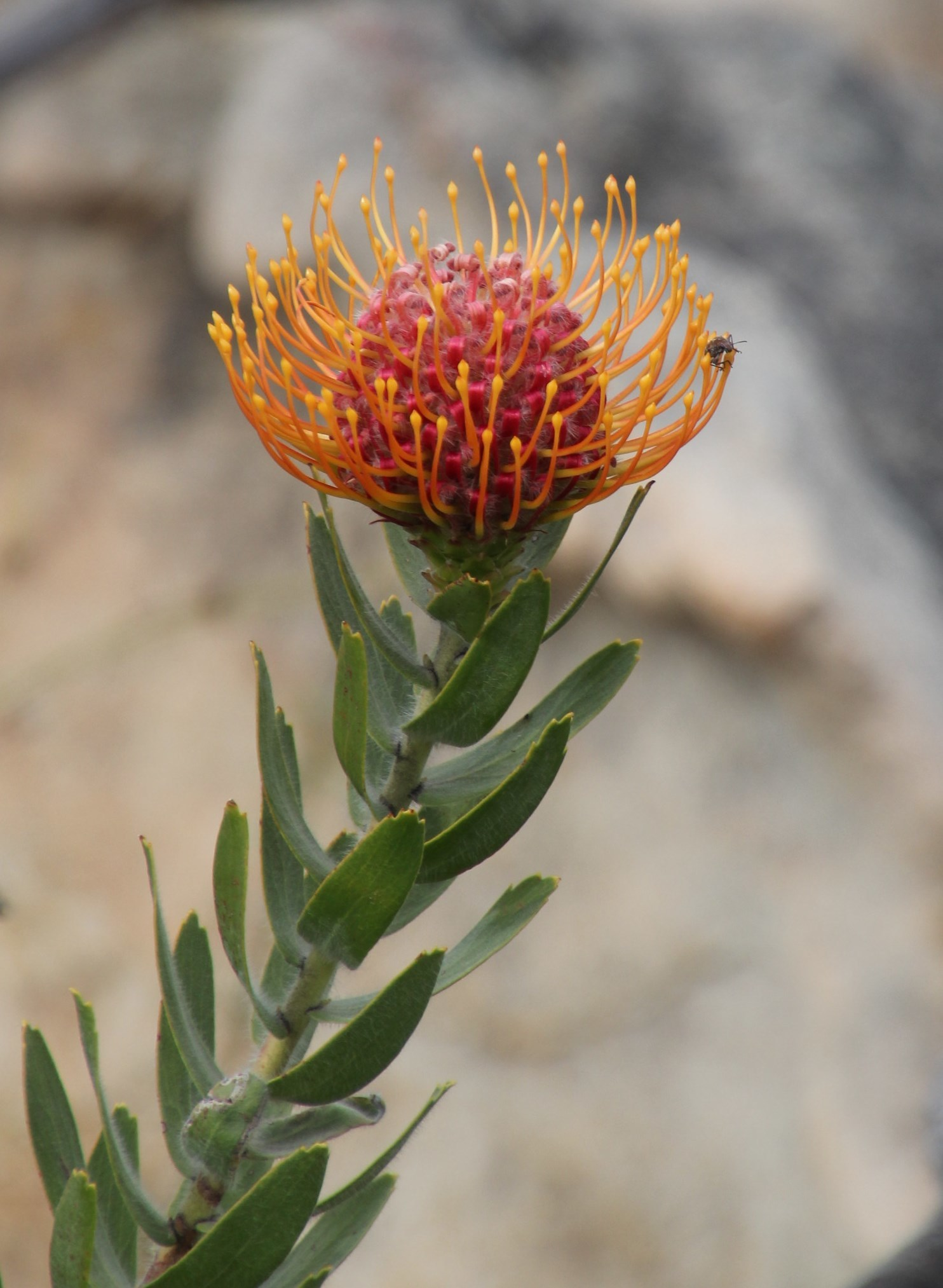

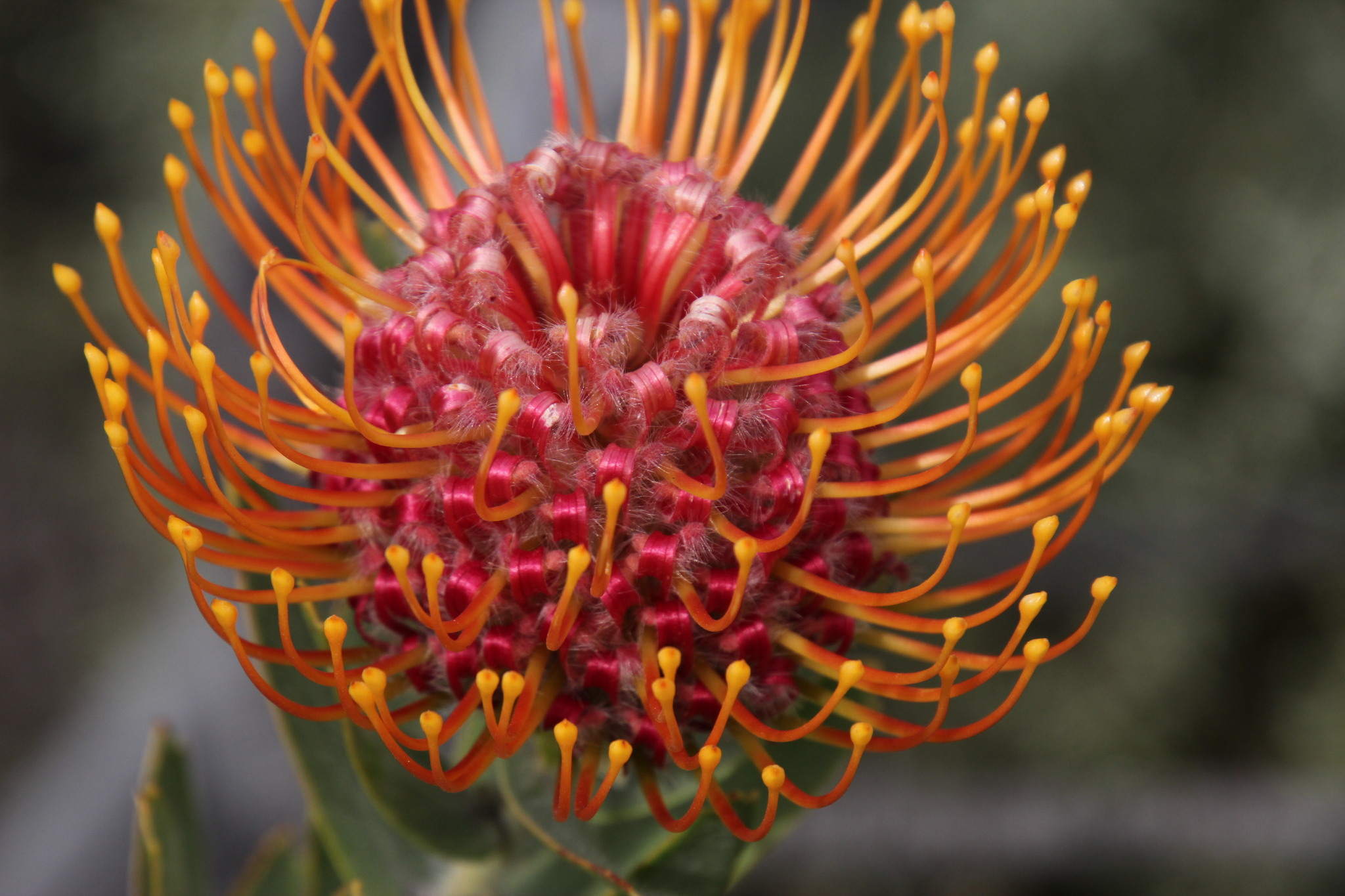

Conservation status
- Vulnerable (IUCN 3.1)

Scientific classification
- Kingdom: Plantae
- Clade: Embryophytes
- Clade: Tracheophytes
- Clade: Angiosperms
- Clade: Eudicots
- Order: Proteales
- Family: Proteaceae
- Genus: Leucospermum
- Species: L. vestitum

Binomial name
- Leucospermum vestitum (Lam.) Rourke

Synonyms
- Protea vestita; Leucadendrum ellipticum; Leucospermum medium, Protea media; Leucospermum incisum

= Leucospermum vestitum =

Species of plant native to South Africa

Leucospermum vestitum is an evergreen, upright to more or less spreading shrub of up to 2½ m (9 ft) high and wide from the family Proteaceae. It has greyish, seated, oblong, 2–3 inch long leaves with two to four teeth near the tip and large, showy two-toned flower heads that are bright orange at first by and age to brilliant crimson. From the center of the perianth emerge long styles, higher up bending towards the center of the head, that jointly give the impression of a pincushion. It is called silky-haired pincushion in English and bergluisie in Afrikaans. It can be found in the Western Cape province of South Africa, and flowers from July until January, peaking October and November.

== Description ==
Leucospermum vestitum is a stiff, upright to spreading, evergreen shrub of up to 2½ m (9 ft) high and 3 m (10 ft) in diameter, that grows from a single stout stem with a smooth grey bark. The flowering stems are 5–8 mm (0.20-0.32 in) in diameter, stiff upright to horizontally spreading, with a thin covering of powdery hairs. The seated and hairless leaves are oblong, elliptic or narrowly oval, 5–7½ cm (2–3 in) long and 1–3 cm (0.4–1.2 in) wide, cut-off or heart-shaped at the foot the tip pointy or with two to four teeth, arranged alternately and somewhat overlapping.

The flower heads are egg- to globe-shaped, 7–9 cm (2.8–3.6 in) in diameter, mostly set individually on the flowering branch. The common base of the flowers in the same head is very narrowly cone-shaped with a pointy tip, 4–5 cm (1.6–2.0 in) long and ¾–1 cm (0.3–0.4 in) across. The bracts subtending the flower head are broadly oval with a pointy to pointed tip, 1–1½ cm (0.4–0.6 in) long and ½–1 cm wide, loosely spreading, membranous, hairless, pale green and shiny, and with a regular row of hairs along the edge.

The bract subtending the individual flower is pointy oval, membranous, enveloping the flower at its foot, about 1½ cm long and 5–7 mm wide, hairless or with a very fine powdery covering and with a row of hairs along the edge. The 4-merous perianth is about 3½ cm (1.4 in) long, initially orange but changing to brilliant carmine later.

The lower part of the perianth called tube, that remains merged when the flower is open, is about 6 mm (¼ in) long, cylinder-shaped, somewhat compressed sideways and hairless. The middle part (or claws) is crescent-shaped and coiling back on the base. The claw facing the center of the head is hairless, the two sideways facing claws have protruding silky hairs, while the claw facing the edge of the head is entirely covered in protruding silky hairs. The upper part (or limbs), which enclosed the pollen presenter in the bud, are oval, each 4–5 mm (0.16–0.2 in) long and set with long protruding silky hairs. Implanted on the inside of each of the four limbs is an oval anther of about 3 mm (0.12 in) long, on a filament of about 1.0 mm (0.04 in) long. From the centre of the perianth emerges a slender tapering and the upper part slightly curved to the center of the head, style of 5–6 cm (2.0–2.4 in) long that is curved toward the center of the head in the upper third. The thickened part at the tip of the style called pollen presenter is yellow, skewed, egg-shaped with a pointy tip, about 3 mm (0.12 in) long, with the groove that functions as the stigma in a raised papilla at the very tip. The ovary is subtended by four white, blunt, line-shaped scales of 1½–2 mm (0.06–0.08 in) long.

=== Differences with related species ===
L. vestitum can be distinguished from related species by the hairless, membranous, loosely spreading involucral bracts, the very narrow, pointy, cone-shaped common base of the flower head, the hairless oblong leaves and the skewed egg-shaped pollen presenter.

== Taxonomy ==
Joseph Martin, a French plant collector who was gardener at the Jardin du Roi in Paris, probably was the first to collect the silky-haired pincushion in 1788. Although there seems to be no written record of his Cape visit en route to Mauritius, the collection of Proteaceae he sent to Jean-Baptiste Lamarck makes it evident that he at least reached the upper Breede River Valley between Worcester and Tulbagh. Lamarck was the first to describe the silky-haired pincushion in 1792 and he named it Protea vestita. Based on another specimen, English botanist Richard Anthony Salisbury described Leucadendrum ellipticum in 1809 in a book titled On the cultivation of the plants belonging to the natural order of Proteeae, that was officially authored by Joseph Knight. Robert Brown published a paper in 1810 called On the natural order of plants called Proteaceae, wherein he created the genus Leucospermum and described Leucospermum medium. In 1816, Jean Louis Marie Poiret, who lumped species that had been assigned to new genera like Leucadendrum and Leucospermum. He assigned Brown's species to Protea, made the new combination Protea media. Edwin Percy Phillips in 1910 distinguished Leucospermum incisum. John Patrick Rourke considered all of these names synonymous, and made created Leucospermum vestitum in 1967 combining the earliest species name with the correct genus name.

L. vestitum is the type species of the showy pincushions, section Brevifilamentum.

The species name vestitum is Latin and means clothed or covered, probably a reference to the silky hairs that surround the perianth.

== Distribution, habitat and ecology ==
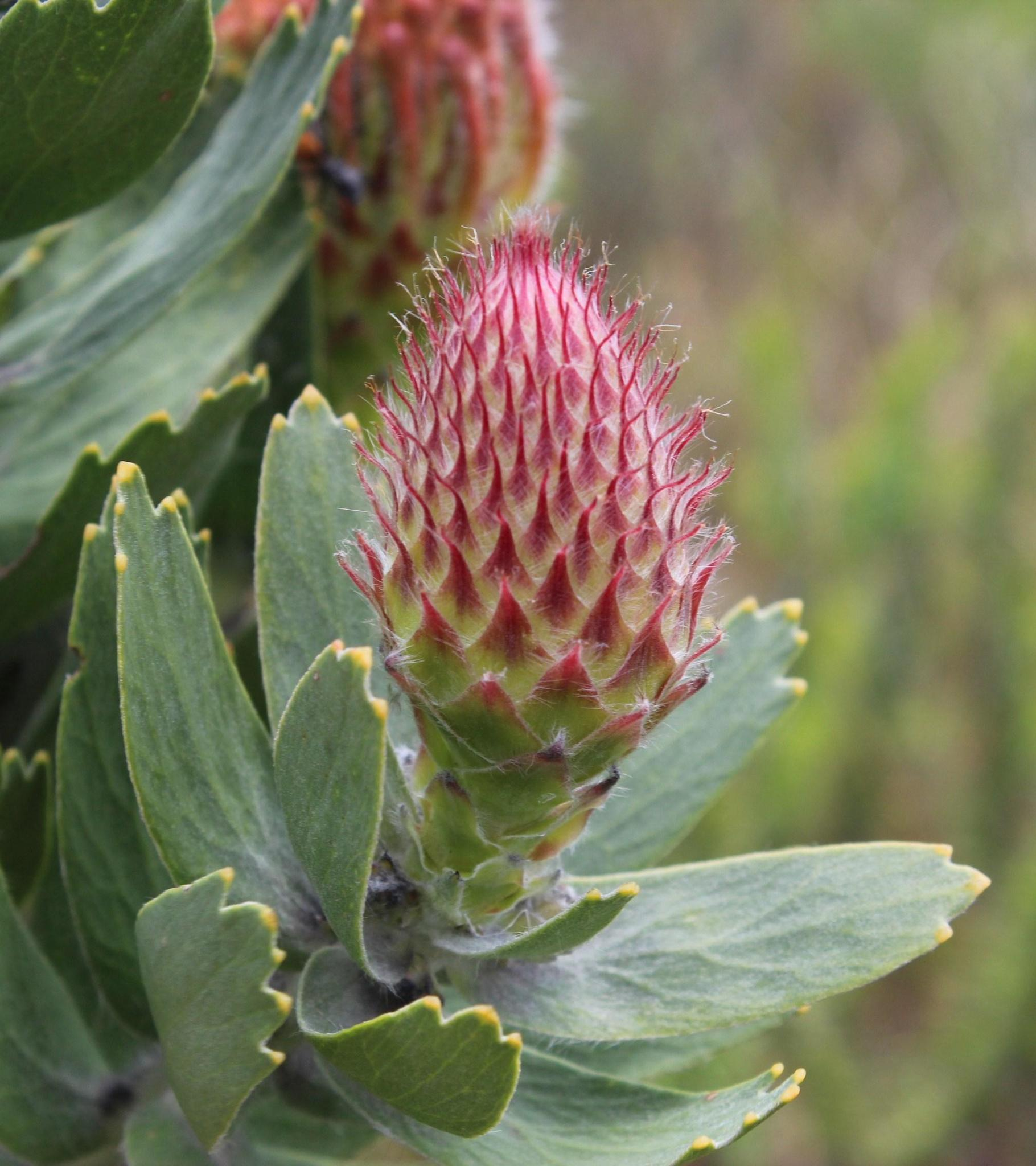
Flowerhead in the bud, showing the involucral bracts and bracteoles

The silky-haired pincushion can be found between Heerenlogementberg (halfway between Klawer and Graafwater) in the north, through the Clanwilliam, Ceres, Piketberg and Tulbagh districts to the Breede River Valley, several kilometers north of Worcester in the south. It was collected on three occasions on the Cape Peninsula (Table Mountain, Lion's Head and Green Point) but since 1886 it seems to have disappeared. It also went extinct on the Paarl mountain, close to Paarl. The silky-haired pincushion seems to agree with a range of ecological circumstances, apart from a well-drained rocky slope of Table Mountain Sandstone. It grows at an altitude of 70–1400 m (200–4000 ft), where it mostly appears on slopes facing north or west. It is very tolerant of drought, which frequently occurs in the arid type of fynbos where it grows, with average annual precipitation as low as 250 mm (10 in). In the Tulbagh valley, plants will mostly have a stiff upright habit while in northerly populations the shrub are rather more sprawling.

The flowers of Leucospermum vestitum are pollinated by birds like the Cape sugarbird and several species of sunbird, that come to feed on the nectar. When the fruits are ripe, about two months after flowering, these fall to the ground, where they attract the attention of ants with the fleshy pale coating called the elaiosome. The ants carry the fruits away to their nests and eat the elaiosome, while the smooth, hard seeds that remain do not fit within the ants' jaws and so remain stored safely underground. The mature plants are killed by the wildfires that naturally occur in the fynbos where it lives. The seeds germinate because of the increased daily temperature fluctuations caused by the removal of the overhead vegetation, and chemicals that wash out of the char during the winter rains, so regenerating the local population.

== Use ==
L. vestitum is one of several species of Leucospermum that are used as cut flower, in particular because it combines showy flowers heads with long straight stems. It is used as a parent for creating Leucospermum hybrids fit for both the garden and the cut-flower market.
