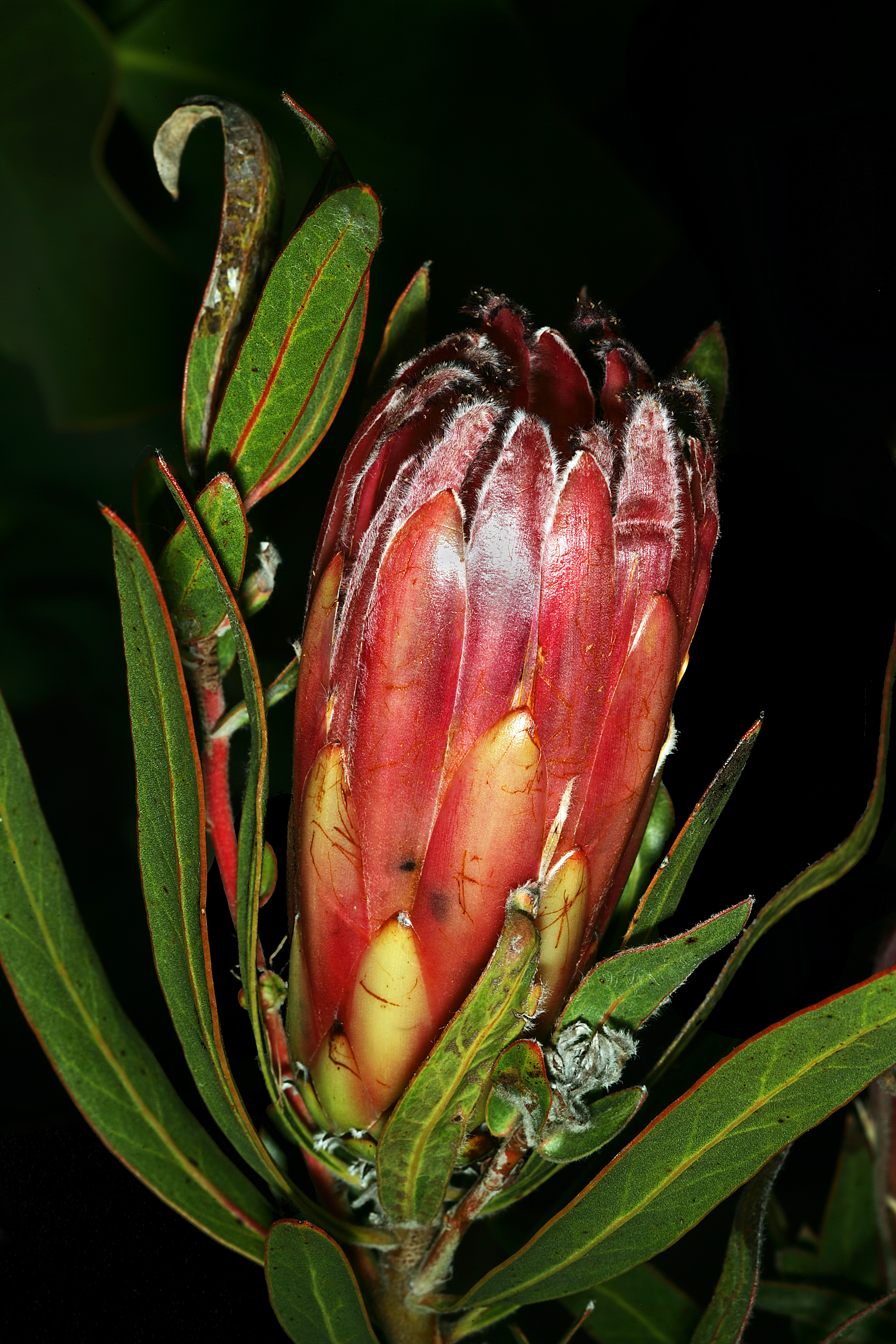
- Protea burchellii, Proteaceae, flowerhead; Caledon, South Africa.

Conservation status
- Vulnerable (IUCN 3.1)

- Vulnerable (SANBI Red List)

Scientific classification
- Kingdom: Plantae
- Clade: Tracheophytes
- Clade: Angiosperms
- Clade: Eudicots
- Order: Proteales
- Family: Proteaceae
- Genus: Protea
- Species: P. burchellii

Binomial name
- Protea burchellii Stapf

Synonyms
- Protea pulchella Andrews, (later homonym), not of Schrad. & J.C.Wendl.; Erodendrum pulchellum Salisb. ex. Knight; Scolymocephalus pulchellus Kuntze; Protea subpulchella Stapf; Protea pulchella var. undulata E.Phillips; Protea pulchra Rycroft

= Protea burchellii =

Species of flowering plant

Protea burchellii, also known as Burchell's sugarbush, is a flowering shrub in the genus Protea, which is endemic to the southwestern Cape Region of South Africa.

The shrub is known by the vernacular name of blinksuikerbos in the Afrikaans language.

== Taxonomy ==
Protea burchellii was described by Otto Stapf in the Flora Capensis in 1912. Although Stapf was unaware of it at the time, the species had in fact been described in other works over a century before him, but under the name P. pulchella or some of its synonyms.

The species P. burchellii had first been described just before the turn of the 18th century under the name P. pulchella by Henry Cranke Andrews in his magazine The Botanists' Repository, however this name was illegitimate, because it had already been used a few years before in 1796 by Heinrich Schrader and Johann Christoph Wendland for a plant that was growing in the Royal Gardens of Hanover in what is now Germany, which in Robert Brown's 1810 work On the Proteaceae of Jussieu was moved to Petrophile pulchella.

Nonetheless, Andrews' Protea pulchella lived on. Richard Anthony Salisbury moved it to Erodendrum pulchellum in the notorious 1809 On the cultivation of the plants belonging to the natural order of Proteeae published under the name of Joseph Knight, much later Otto Kuntze moved it to Scolymocephalus pulchellus in 1891, although his Protea reclassification was soon rejected. Edwin Percy Phillips described a P. pulchella var. undulata, also known as variety β, for a plant with leaves with undulating margins, and then Stapf described a P. subpulchella in 1925.

=== Type ===
Stapf designated a specimen collected by the English explorer William John Burchell numbered 8332 as the holotype. It was collected somewhere between Sir Lowry's Pass and Jonkers Hoek, in the area of Stellenbosch, at the very end of March, 1815. Burchell had in fact collected a type series, according to the South African botanist John Patrick Rourke, and thus in 1978 accordingly designated one of the two specimen sheets labelled as Burchell8332 housed at the Kew Herbarium as the lectotype; this specific sheet had originally been part of Burchell's personal herbarium, and had been donated to Kew upon his death by his widow in 1865.

=== Etymology ===
The specific epithet commemorates the collector of the type specimens, William Burchell.

== Description ==
The plant takes the form of a spreading, evergreen, multi-branched shrub. It grows one or two, or up to three metres in height, and three metres wide. It has been called "mid-sized" for a Protea. The branches all arise from a single, central, branched, subterranean stem. These branches are erect-growing according to some sources, or, according to the original description, grow just above the ground. The upper, younger part of the branches are clothed in fine hairs.

The length of a generation in this species is estimated to be around 20 years. It is quite fast-growing, and in cultivation the first flowers can appear after the plant is two years old.

=== Leaves ===
The leaves are glossy, olive-green in colour, and are spotted with tiny black points. Their shape is linear to narrowly oblong, or also described as linear to narrowly oblanceolate, attenuated on the lower part, with an acute but callous end. They are 6–9 inches (15–23 cm) in length and 2/3–1 inch (1.7–2.5 cm) broad. The leaves have prominent veins on both sides, with lateral nerves that run into a narrow, somewhat thickened band along the margin. The leaves are usually glabrous, but may have an indumentum of fine hairs at and around their bases.

=== Flowers ===
It blooms in the Winter, specifically primarily from June to August in most of its native South Africa, but sometimes into Spring on the Cape Peninsula. The flowers are clustered together in a pseudanthium, a special type of inflorescence, which is also called a flower head. In this species this structure will grow up to 10 centimetres (3.9 in) in length by 7 centimetres (2.8 in) in diameter, although the original description gives a length of 2.5 inches (6.4 cm) and diameter of 1.5 inches (3.8 cm). It is almost round in shape, has a rounded base, and lacks a peduncle (i.e. it is sessile).

The flower head is surrounded by petal-like appendages called 'involucral bracts'. The bracts are often pink, but forms with white-coloured bracts exist, as do red- and yellow-coloured forms. The colour range has been described as "cream-coloured to deep carmine", or "dark chestnut-brown" for the outer bracts in the original description (possibly based on dried herbarium material). The outer bracts are ovate in shape, with their ends obtuse (blunt) to somewhat obtuse, and when very young are covered in a layer of greyish, finely pubescent hairs, with the margins of the bracts being ciliate (i.e. fringed with a hairs like an eyelash), although this soon falls off and they become glabrous. The inner bracts are oblong and elongated in shape and their ends are obtuse; they are just a bit smaller in length than the actual flowers.

The plant is monoecious with both sexes in each flower. The petals and sepals of the flowers are fused into a 1.25 inches (3.2 cm) long perianth-sheath. The last two thirds of this sheath is slender, but then it widens towards the base, this area having three inconspicuous keels and five veins. The outside of the sheath is covered in dense amounts of dark brown, pubescent hairs on the slender part, but the widened base is ciliolate but otherwise glabrous. The sheath has a 12.7 mm long lip. This lip is shaggy-haired (i.e. villous), except for its back, which is glabrescent. The two outer of these teeth are much longer than the middle one: they are thread-like in shape, sharply pointed, and 3.2 mm long, whereas the middle one is much shorter and less conspicuous. All of the stamens are fertile. Their filaments are 0.53 mm long and widen towards their tops. The anthers are linear and 4.2 mm long. The apical glands are 0.53 mm in length, oblong in shape and end in an obtuse point. The ovary is densely covered in reddish hairs and is subobovate-oblong in shape. The style is subulate and terete, and arises from a narrowly compressed and obliquely lanceolate base. It is 3.7 mm long, covered in pubescent hairs from the top up until its middle section, strongly curved below its middle, and constricted where it joins with the ovary. The stigma is subulate, with an obtuse end, and almost imperceptibly becomes the style.

=== Fruit ===
The fruit is a nut. The seed is stored in a capsule which is retained in the dried, fire-resistant inflorescence, which itself remains attached to the plant after senescence. When they are eventually released after fires stimulate the capsules to open, the seeds are dispersed by means of the wind.

== Distribution ==
Protea burchellii is endemic to the southern and southwestern Cape Region of South Africa, where it is only found in the Western Cape province. The range extends from the Hottentots Holland Mountains to the Olifants River Mountains, and on the lowland flatlands on the Cape Peninsula (historically) to the plains of the Hopefield Flats. Isolated populations occur on the Witzenbergvlakte, Piketberg, and the upper part of the Breede River Valley. It grows around the Paarl Rock and near the town of Mamre.

== Ecology ==
The periodic wildfires which occur in its habitat will destroy the adult plants, but the seeds can survive such an event safely stored in the old flower heads. Pollination occurs through the action of birds.

=== Habitat ===
The plant grows in a variety of habitats but prefers to grow in more fertile soils, fully exposed to sun on lower mountain slopes. It has been found growing in fynbos, renosterveld, coastal vegetation and the vegetation found on the more fertile shale bands. It often grows in shale, but it is found in a variety of soil types as well: alluvium, sand and silcrete; as well as substrates derived from granite. It occurs at altitudes of 100 to 850 metres.

== Uses ==
Protea burchellii and its hybrids are popular crops in the cut flower industry.

=== Horticulture ===
This species is quite winter hardy for use in South African gardens. Many hybrid varieties are commercially available in South Africa. It can be used in the rock garden, as a specimen plant, or, due to its average height, as a shrub in the mid-layer of the border. It is best grown in a sandy, well-drained, fynbos soil.

Propagation is easiest done by sowing the seeds, but it has also been achieved via cuttings. Seeds should be sown shallowly in May in South Africa (late autumn) in a well-drained substrate treated with a fungicide. Germination requires warm day and cold night temperatures. Germination is irregular, with some seeds starting to grow a year after sowing. Seedlings are easily killed by overwatering. Cuttings can be taken from the tips of shoots from December to March in South Africa. These should be treated with a rooting hormone, planted in a very well-drained substrate, and kept moist, but not wet. Roots should appear after some five weeks.

The pathogenic, fungi-like Phytophthora is an important disease of the roots in cultivated plants. Infected plants become wilted and dry, eventually yellowing and then dying. The best one can do in such situations is to pull up the plant and burn it, apply fungicide to the soil where the plant stood, and no longer replant Proteaceae in that area.

== Conservation ==
In 1998 and in 2008 Protea burchellii was considered locally common and not threatened, but by this time the species was already considered extinct on the Cape Peninsula. Nonetheless, it has been photographed blooming on the Lion's Head on the Cape.

The species was classified as "vulnerable" on the Redlist of South African Plants by the South African National Biodiversity Institute (SANBI) in 2008; this was upheld again in 2009. They believe the total population numbers are decreasing.

It grows in areas generally unsuitable for normal cultivation, and most habitat loss was thought to be fairly recent in 2008. Nonetheless, SANBI estimated that the 'historical' population had been reduced at least 30% based on a habitat loss of some 40%, primarily to agricultural development. This was especially caused by the recent success of the vineyards and olive orchards. SANBI estimated that with the continuing viability of these farms a further reduction of the population by 30% is likely by the year 2028. Other threats identified by SANBI are over-harvesting, pollution, invasive plants, natural disasters and changes in native species dynamics.

== Gallery ==
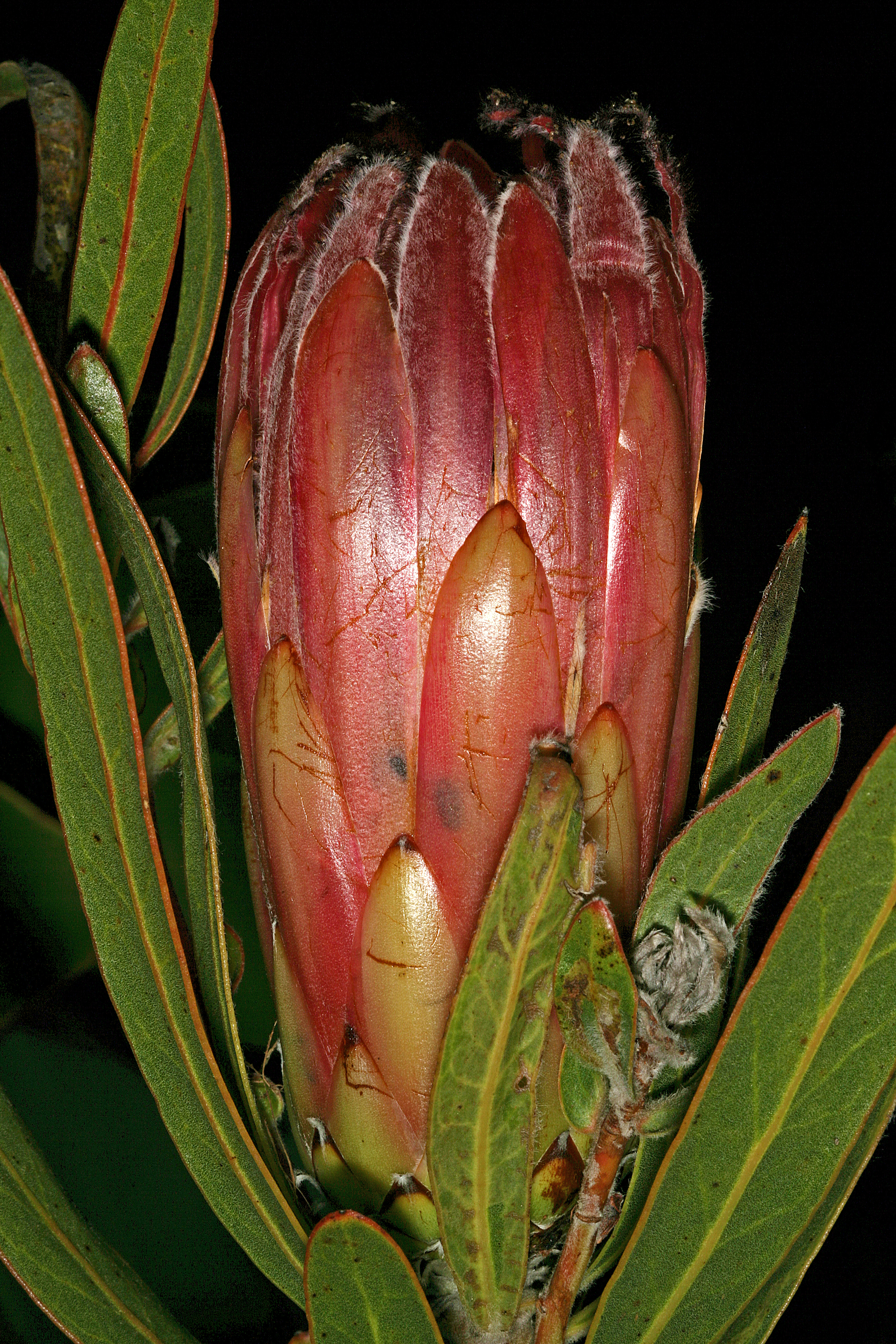

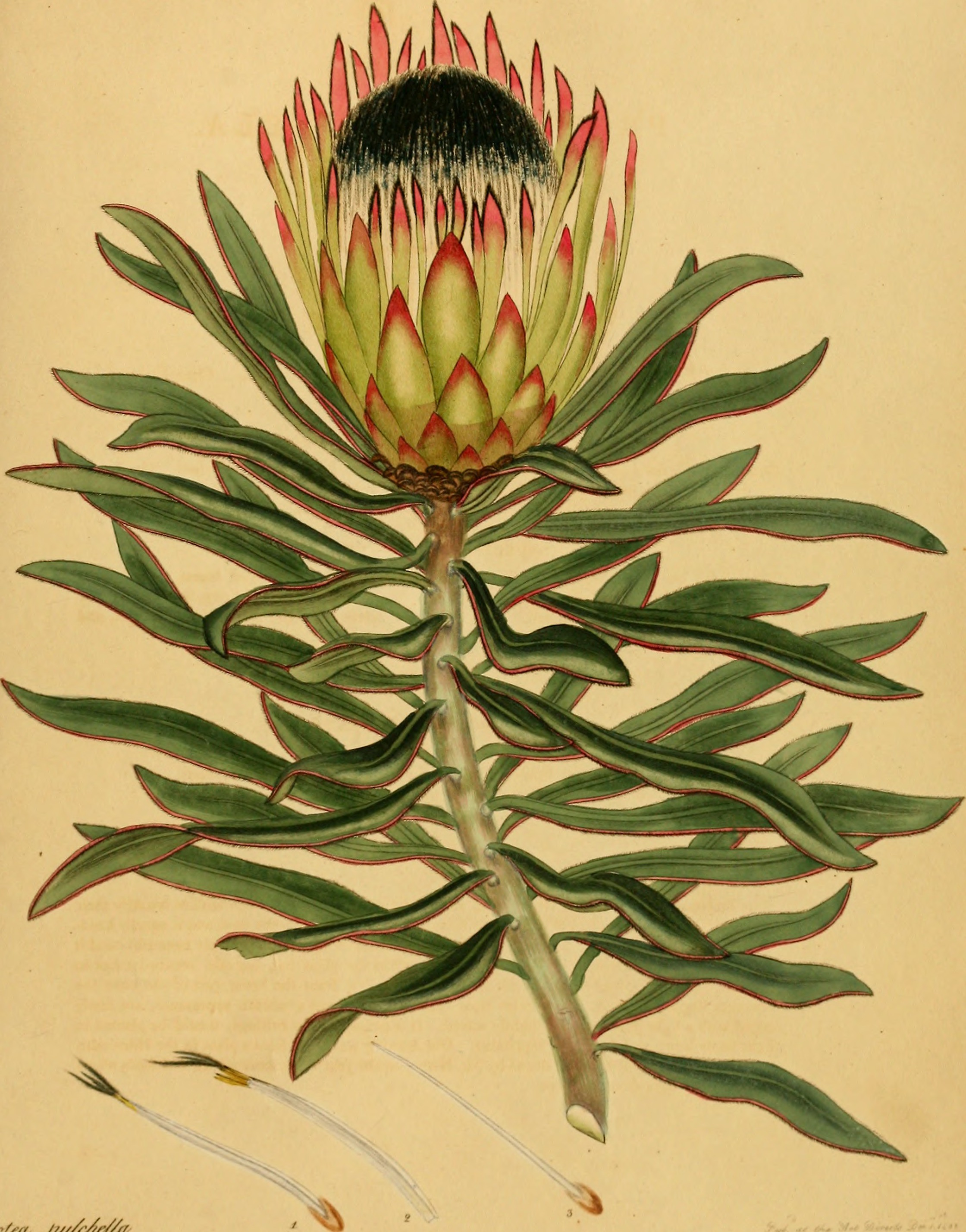
