= List of heritage sites near Cape Town =

Sites recognised ny SAHRA

This is a list of the heritage sites near Cape Town as recognized by the South African Heritage Resources Agency.

For additional provincial heritage sites declared by Heritage Western Cape, the provincial heritage resources authority of the Western Cape Province of South Africa, please see the entries at the end of the list. These sites have been declared subsequent to the implementation of the new legislation on 1 April 2000 and unlike those in the SAHRA portion of the list are not former national monuments declared by the former National Monuments Council, the predecessor of both SAHRA and Heritage Western Cape. In the instance of these sites the "identifier" code used is that of Heritage Western Cape rather than SAHRA.

SAHRA identifier	Site name	Description	Town	District	NHRA status	Coordinates	Image
9/2/018/0001	Fort Wynyard, Green Point, Cape Town	Fort Wynyard was erected in 1860 near the site where the Dutch East India Company's battery "Kyk in de Pot", which was dismantled between 1825 and 1827, stood. The fort was named after Lt-Gen. R. H. Wynyard, the then Lieutenant-Governor of the Cape Colony Type of site: Fort.	Cape Town, Green Point	The Cape	Provincial Heritage Site	33°54′12″S 18°24′50″E	Fort Wynyard was erected in 1860 near the site where the Dutch East India Company's battery "Kyk in de Pot", which was dismantled between 1825 and 1827, stood. The fort was named after Lt-Gen. R. H. Wynyard, the then Lieutenant-Governor of the Cape Colony Type of site: Fort. Media related to Fort Wynyard at Wikimedia Commons
9/2/018/0002	Valkenberg, Observatory, Cape Town	Built on land granted in 1661, the Valkenburg Homestead is one of the only original homesteads still standing on the Liesbeeck River. It was named after Cornelius Valck who became the owner in 1720. The north wing, with its curvilinear parapet, was added later Type of site: Farmstead; Current use: Hotel, restaurant & vault.	Cape Town, Observatory	The Cape	Provincial Heritage Site	33°56′31″S 18°28′46″E	Built on land granted in 1661, the Valkenburg Homestead is one of the only original homesteads still standing on the Liesbeeck River. It was named after Cornelius Valck who became the owner in 1720. The north wing, with its curvilinear parapet, was added later Type of site: Farmstead Current use: Hotel, restaurant & vault. Media related to Valkenberg at Wikimedia Commons
9/2/018/0002/01	Black River/Liesbeeck River, Confluence Area, Observatory					33°55′48″S 18°28′42″E	
9/2/018/0004	Robben Island, Table Bay	"Throughout documented history, Robben Island has been associated with banishment, suffering and the subjugation of the human spirit. From the earliest days of colonial rule, it was used as a place of banishment and exile for those opposing colonial authority	Robben Island, Cape Town	The Cape	National Heritage Site	33°48′21″S 18°22′13″E	"Throughout documented history, Robben Island has been associated with banishment, suffering and the subjugation of the human spirit. From the earliest days of colonial rule, it was used as a place of banishment and exile for those opposing colonial authority Media related to Robben Island at Wikimedia Commons
9/2/018/0004/02	Robben Island Lighthouse, Robben Island			Cape Town			
9/2/018/0004/03	Church of the Good Shepherd, Robben Island					33°48′20″S 18°22′36″E	
9/2/018/0004/04	Millennium facility, Robben Island			Cape Town			Upload Photo
9/2/018/0004/05	Robben Island, IEM System, Robben Island			Cape Town			Upload Photo
9/2/018/0005	Melbourne Terrace, 1-13 Melbourne Road, Woodstock, Cape Town	Type of site: Terrace.	Cape Town, Woodstock	The Cape	Provincial Heritage Site	33°55′53″S 18°26′49″E	Type of site: Terrace.
9/2/018/0005/001	1 Melbourne Road, Woodstock, Cape Town	Type of site: Terraced House.	Cape Town, Woodstock	The Cape	Provincial Heritage Site	33°55′51″S 18°26′50″E	Upload Photo
9/2/018/0005/002	3 Melbourne Road, Woodstock, Cape Town	Type of site: Terraced House.	Cape Town, Woodstock	The Cape	Provincial Heritage Site	33°55′51″S 18°26′50″E	Upload Photo
9/2/018/0005/003	5 Melbourne Road, Woodstock, Cape Town	Type of site: Terraced House.	Cape Town, Woodstock	The Cape	Provincial Heritage Site	33°55′51″S 18°26′50″E	Upload Photo
9/2/018/0005/004	7 Melbourne Road, Woodstock, Cape Town	Type of site: Terraced House.	Cape Town, Woodstock	The Cape	Provincial Heritage Site	33°55′51″S 18°26′50″E	Upload Photo
9/2/018/0005/005	9 Melbourne Road, Woodstock, Cape Town	Type of site: Terraced House.	Cape Town, Woodstock	The Cape	Provincial Heritage Site	33°55′52″S 18°26′50″E	Upload Photo
9/2/018/0005/006	11 Melbourne Road, Woodstock, Cape Town	Type of site: Terraced House.	Cape Town, Woodstock	The Cape	Provincial Heritage Site	33°55′52″S 18°26′50″E	Upload Photo
9/2/018/0005/007	13 Melbourne Road, Woodstock, Cape Town		Cape Town, Woodstock	The Cape	Provincial Heritage Site	33°55′53″S 18°26′49″E	Upload Photo
9/2/018/0006	see 9/2/018/0256/1			Cape Town			Upload Photo
9/2/018/0010	Clifton, Glen Beach, The Ridge and Bakoven, Cape Town		Cape Town, Clifton	The Cape	Heritage Area	33°56′30″S 18°22′25″E	
9/2/018/0010/01	Bungalow 97, The Ridge, Clifton, Cape Town			Cape Town			Upload Photo
9/2/018/0010/02	Bungalow 25, Clifton, Cape Town			Cape Town			Upload Photo
9/2/018/0010/03	Bungalow 61, Clifton, Cape Town			Cape Town			Upload Photo
9/2/018/0010/04	Bungalow 64, Clifton, Cape Town			Cape Town			Upload Photo
9/2/018/0010/05	Bungalow 14, Glen Beach, Cape Town			Cape Town			Upload Photo
9/2/018/0010/06	Bungalow 76, Clifton, Cape Town			Cape Town			Upload Photo
9/2/018/0010/07	Bungalow 58, Clifton, Cape Town			Cape Town			Upload Photo
9/2/018/0010/08	Bungalow 31, Bakoven, Cape Town			Cape Town			Upload Photo
9/2/018/0010/09	Bungalow 2, Glen Beach, Cape Town			Cape Town			Upload Photo
9/2/018/0010/10	Bungalow 42, Clifton, Cape Town			Cape Town			Upload Photo
9/2/018/0010/11	Bungalow 1, Glen Beach, Cape Town			Cape Town			Upload Photo
9/2/018/0010/13	Bungalow 8, Second Beach, Clifton, Cape Town			Cape Town			Upload Photo
9/2/018/0010/14	Bungalow 71, Clifton, Cape Town			Cape Town			Upload Photo
9/2/018/0010/15	Bungalow 8, Beta Road, Bakoven, Cape Town			Cape Town			Upload Photo
9/2/018/0010/16	Bungalow 91, The Ridge, Clifton, Cape Town			Cape Town			Upload Photo
9/2/018/0010/17	Bungalow 2, First Beach, Clifton, Cape Town			Cape Town			Upload Photo
9/2/018/0010/18	Bungalow 7, Beta Road, Bakoven, Cape Town			Cape Town			Upload Photo
9/2/018/0010/19	Bungalow 5, Glen Beach, Cape Town			Cape Town			Upload Photo
9/2/018/0010/20	Bungalow 11, Beta Road, Bakoven, Cape Town			Cape Town			Upload Photo
9/2/018/0010/21	Bungalow 23, Beta Road, Bakoven, Cape Town			Cape Town			Upload Photo
9/2/018/0010/22	Bungalow 94, The Ridge, Fourth Beach, Clifton, Cape Town			Cape Town			Upload Photo
9/2/018/0010/23	Bungalow 30, Clifton, Cape Town			Cape Town			Upload Photo
9/2/018/0010/24	Bungalow 10, Bakoven, Cape Town			Cape Town			Upload Photo
9/2/018/0010/25	Bungalow 15, Bakoven, Cape Town			Cape Town			Upload Photo
9/2/018/0010/26	Bungalow 54, Fourth Beach, Clifton, Cape Town			Cape Town			Upload Photo
9/2/018/0010/27	Bungalow 73, Fourth Beach, Clifton, Cape Town			Cape Town			Upload Photo
9/2/018/0010/28	Bungalow 35, Third Beach, Clifton, Cape Town			Cape Town			Upload Photo
9/2/018/0010/29	Bungalow 14, Beta Road, Bakoven, Cape Town			Cape Town			Upload Photo
9/2/018/0010/30	Bungalow 27, Third Beach, Clifton, Cape Town			Cape Town			Upload Photo
9/2/018/0010/31	Bungalow 13, Bakoven, Cape Town			Cape Town			Upload Photo
9/2/018/0010/32	Dellville, Site 29, Third Beach, Clifton, Cape Town			Cape Town			Upload Photo
9/2/018/0010/33	Bungalow 3, Clifton, Cape Town			Cape Town			Upload Photo
9/2/018/0010/34	Bungalow 75, The Ridge, Clifton, Cape Town			Cape Town			Upload Photo
9/2/018/0010/35	Bungalow 12, Victoria Road, Clifton			Cape Town			Upload Photo
9/2/018/0010/36	Bungalow 40A, Beta Road, Bakoven			Cape Town			Upload Photo
9/2/018/0010/37	Bungalow 26, Beta Road, Bakoven			Cape Town			Upload Photo
9/2/018/0010/38	Bungalow 62, Fourth Beach, Clifton			Cape Town			Upload Photo
9/2/018/0010/39	Bungalow 83, The Ridge, Clifton			Cape Town			Upload Photo
9/2/018/0010/40	Bungalow 57, Fourth Beach, Clifton			Cape Town			Upload Photo
9/2/018/0010/41	Bungalow 24, Beta Road, Bakoven			Cape Town			Upload Photo
9/2/018/0010/42	Bungalow 81, The Ridge, Clifton			Cape Town			Upload Photo
9/2/018/0010/43	Bungalow 46, Fourth Beach, Clifton			Cape Town			Upload Photo
9/2/018/0010/44	see 9/2/018/0010/016			Cape Town			Upload Photo
9/2/018/0010/45	Bungalow 22, Beta Road, Bakoven, Cape Town			Cape Town			Upload Photo
9/2/018/0010/46	Bungalow 47, Fourth Beach, Clifton, Cape Town			Cape Town			Upload Photo
9/2/018/0010/47	Bungalow 80A, Clifton, Cape Town			Cape Town			Upload Photo
9/2/018/0010/48	Bungalow 39, 3rd Beach, Clifton, Cape Town			Cape Town			Upload Photo
9/2/018/0010/49	Bungalow 51, Brooke Street, Bakoven, Cape Town			Cape Town			Upload Photo
9/2/018/0010/50	Bungalow 87, Clifton, Cape Town			Cape Town			Upload Photo
9/2/018/0010/51	Bungalow 47, Bakoven, Cape Town			Cape Town			Upload Photo
9/2/018/0010/52	Bungalow 37, Clifton, Cape Town			Cape Town			Upload Photo
9/2/018/0010/53	Bungalow 31, Third Beach, Clifton, Cape Town			Cape Town			Upload Photo
9/2/018/0010/54	Bungalow 72, Clifton, Cape Town			Cape Town			Upload Photo
9/2/018/0010/55	Bungalow 32, Clifton, Cape Town			Cape Town			Upload Photo
9/2/018/0010/56	Bungalow 86, The Ridge, Cliff Road, Clifton, Cape Town			Cape Town			Upload Photo
9/2/018/0010/57	Bungalow 82, Erf 479, Clifton, Cape Town			Cape Town			Upload Photo
9/2/018/0010/58	Bungalow 34, Erf 412, Clifton, Cape Town			Cape Town			Upload Photo
9/2/018/0010/59	Bungalow 63, Fourth Beach, Clifton, Cape Town			Cape Town			Upload Photo
9/2/018/0010/60	Bungalow 9, Beta Close, Bakoven, Clifton, Cape Town			Cape Town			Upload Photo
9/2/018/0010/61	16 Beta Road, Clifton, Cape Town					33°57′39″S 18°22′24″E	Upload Photo
9/2/018/0010/62	Bungalow 80, The Ridge, Clifton, Cape Town			Cape Town			Upload Photo
9/2/018/0010/63	1 Beta Road, Erf 2667, Bakoven, Cape Town					33°57′39″S 18°22′28″E	Upload Photo
9/2/018/0010/64	Bungalow 49, Erf 2716, Bakoven, Cape Town			Cape Town			Upload Photo
9/2/018/0010/65	Bungalow 40, Fourth Beach, Clifton, Cape Town			Cape Town			Upload Photo
9/2/018/0010/66	Bungalow 89, The Ridge, Clifton, Cape Town			Cape Town			Upload Photo
9/2/018/0010/67	Bungalow 10, Glen Beach Clifton, Cape Town			Cape Town			Upload Photo
9/2/018/0010/68	Bungalow 18, Beta Road, Bakoven, Clifton, Cape Town			Cape Town			Upload Photo
9/2/018/0022-125	Erf 1446, Camps Bay		Cape Town, Camps Bay	The Cape	Provincial Heritage Site	33°57′00″S 18°23′00″E	Upload Photo
9/2/018/0022-126	Erf 1559, Camps Bay		Cape Town, Camps Bay	The Cape	Provincial Heritage Site	33°57′00″S 18°23′00″E	Upload Photo
9/2/018/0022/004	Land adjoining Earles Dyke, The Glen, Camps Bay, Cape Town	Just above the Clifton Nature Reserve, between Victoria and Kloof Roads, this vacant piece of land, about eight hectares in extent, is situated. It was proclaimed a natural monument for various reasons. The natural vegetation of the slopes of Table Mounta Type of site: Vacant Site. The natural vegetation of the slopes of Table Mountain has been preserved here; it forms a link between the proclaimed area of Table Mountain on the slope of Lion’s Head and the Clifton Nature Reserve as a result of which a strip of land, still in its nat	Cape Town, Camps Bay	The Cape	Provincial Heritage Site	33°56′33″S 18°22′34″E	Upload Photo
9/2/018/0022/006	Public Open Space between Nettleton Road and the sea, between Bantry Bay and Clifton, at Cape Town	Type of site: Vacant Site.	Cape Town, Clifton	The Cape	Provincial Heritage Site	33°55′56″S 18°22′42″E	Upload Photo
9/2/018/0022/01	Cableway Stations					33°56′54″S 18°24′12″E	
9/2/018/0022/05	Signal Hill					33°55′03″S 18°24′14″E	Media related to Signal Hill (Cape Town) at Wikimedia Commons
9/2/018/0024	Dutch Reformed Church and Parsonage, Three Anchor Bay, 265 Main Road, Sea Point, Cape Town	This church building was officially opened on 9 July 1879 by Dr Andrew Murray. Not until eight months later, on 10 March 1880, did the secession of the congregation from the Groote Kerk take place. The stained-glass windows date from 1885 and the embattle Type of site: Church and Parsonage Current use: Church : Dutch Reformed.	Cape Town, Sea Point	The Cape	Provincial Heritage Site	33°54′29″S 18°24′05″E	This church building was officially opened on 9 July 1879 by Dr Andrew Murray. Not until eight months later, on 10 March 1880, did the secession of the congregation from the Groote Kerk take place. The stained-glass windows date from 1885 and the embattle Type of site: Church and Parsonage Current use: Church : Dutch Reformed.
9/2/018/0028	Battle of Blaauberg Battlefield, Bloubergstrand, Cape Town District			Cape Town			Upload Photo
9/2/018/0028/01	Proposed memorial for the Battle of Blaauberg, Bloubergstrand, Cape			Cape Town			Upload Photo
9/2/018/0033	The Retreat, 16 Park Avenue, Camps Bay, Cape Town	Type of site: House.	Cape Town, Camps Bay	The Cape	Provisional Protection	33°57′01″S 18°22′52″E	Upload Photo
9/2/018/0035	MILNERTON MUNICIPAL AREA, GENERAL			Cape Town			Upload Photo
9/2/018/0037	Woutersen-Wessels Vault, Wessels Road, Green Point, Cape Town	A vault with a surrounding wall. It was erected in 1827 by the widow of Peter Woutersen. His granddaughter married Jacobus Chris toffel Wessels, whose son, Sir John Wessels, became Chief Justice of South Africa. Various members of the 'family lived on the estate. Because the vault had be Type of site: Vault. The architecture is most interesting and there is reason to believe that it is the work of the well-known architect Hermann Schutte. Some prominent citizens have been buried there, inter alia Adv. M.L. Wessels, brother of Sir John Wess	Cape Town, Green Point	The Cape	Provincial Heritage Site	33°54′44″S 18°24′45″E	A vault with a surrounding wall. It was erected in 1827 by the widow of Peter Woutersen. His granddaughter married Jacobus Chris toffel Wessels, whose son, Sir John Wessels, became Chief Justice of South Africa. Various members of the 'family lived on the estate. Because the vault had be Type of site: Vault. The architecture is most interesting and there is reason to believe that it is the work of the well-known architect Hermann Schutte. Some prominent citizens have been buried there, inter alia Adv. M.L. Wessels, brother of Sir John Wess
9/2/018/0039	Dutch Reformed Church, Batavia Road, Bloubergstrand					33°48′01″S 18°27′34″E	Upload Photo
9/2/018/0044	Brooklyn Fire Station, Koeberg Road, Brooklyn, Cape Town			Cape Town		33°54′57″S 18°28′50″E	Upload Photo
9/2/018/0049	18-20 Stadler Road, Bloubergstrand, Cape Town District			Cape Town		33°48′09″S 18°27′37″E	Upload Photo
9/2/018/0053	Green Point Lighthouse, Cape Town	Main article: Green Point Lighthouse, Cape Town This lighthouse, which was built by Hermann Schutte and probably also designed by him, is the oldest structure of its kind in South Africa. Construction work started on 14 September 1821, and the lighthouse was officially opened on 12 April 1824. It origi Type of site: Lighthouse Current use: Lighthouse.	Cape Town, Green Point	The Cape	Provincial Heritage Site	33°54′04″S 18°24′02″E	This lighthouse, which was built by Hermann Schutte and probably also designed by him, is the oldest structure of its kind in South Africa. Construction work started on 14 September 1821, and the lighthouse was officially opened on 12 April 1824. It origi Type of site: Lighthouse Current use: Lighthouse. Media related to Green Point Lighthouse at Wikimedia Commons
9/2/018/0057	BLOUBERGSTRAND LOCAL AREA, GENERAL			Cape Town			Upload Photo
9/2/018/0062	Old Wooden Bridge over the Milnerton Lagoon, Milnerton	Type of site: Bridge Current use: Bridge.	Cape Town, Milnerton	The Cape	Provincial Heritage Site	33°52′53″S 18°29′25″E	Type of site: Bridge Current use: Bridge. Media related to Old Milnerton Bridge at Wikimedia Commons
9/2/018/0064	was Ellerslie Girls' High School and was Tafelberg School, Main Road, Sea Point, Cape Town	Type of site: School Current use: Redevelopment	Cape Town, Sea Point	The Cape	Provincial Heritage Site	33°54′57″S 18°23′27″E	Type of site: School Current use: Redevelopment
9/2/018/0067	38-46 Queens Road, Bantry Bay, Cape Town			Cape Town		33°55′28″S 18°22′55″E	Upload Photo
9/2/018/0067/001	38 Queens Road, Bantry Bay, Cape Town		Cape Town, Bantry Bay	The Cape	Provincial Heritage Site	33°55′23″S 18°22′50″E	Upload Photo
9/2/018/0067/2	40 Queens Road, Bantry Bay, Cape Town			Cape Town		33°55′28″S 18°22′55″E	Upload Photo
9/2/018/0067/3	42 Queens Road, Bantry Bay, Cape Town			Cape Town		33°55′28″S 18°22′55″E	Upload Photo
9/2/018/0067/4	44 Queens Road, Bantry Bay, Cape Town			Cape Town		33°55′28″S 18°22′55″E	Upload Photo
9/2/018/0067/5	46 Queens Road, Bantry Bay, Cape Town			Cape Town		33°55′28″S 18°22′55″E	Upload Photo
9/2/018/0074/001	2 Grove Road, Mowbray, Cape Town	These nine houses form part of a unique block consisting of two terraced rows of identical late Victorian double-storeyed semi-detached houses that date from the 1880s. The first and last houses in Albert Road have ornate triangular pedimented gables with	Cape Town, Mowbray	The Cape	Provincial Heritage Site	33°56′45″S 18°28′22″E	These nine houses form part of a unique block consisting of two terraced rows of identical late Victorian double-storeyed semi-detached houses that date from the 1880s. The first and last houses in Albert Road have ornate triangular pedimented gables with
9/2/018/0074/002	4 Grove Road, Mowbray, Cape Town	These nine houses form part of a unique block consisting of two terraced rows of identical late Victorian double-storeyed semi-detached houses that date from the 1880s. The first and last houses in Albert Road have ornate triangular pedimented gables	Cape Town, Mowbray	The Cape	Provincial Heritage Site	33°56′45″S 18°28′22″E	These nine houses form part of a unique block consisting of two terraced rows of identical late Victorian double-storeyed semi-detached houses that date from the 1880s. The first and last houses in Albert Road have ornate triangular pedimented gables
9/2/018/0074/003	6 Grove Road, Mowbray, Cape Town	These nine houses form part of a unique block consisting of two terraced rows of identical late Victorian double-storeyed semi-detached houses that date from the 1880s. The first and last houses in Albert Road have ornate triangular pedimented gables	Cape Town, Mowbray	The Cape	Provincial Heritage Site	33°56′45″S 18°28′22″E	These nine houses form part of a unique block consisting of two terraced rows of identical late Victorian double-storeyed semi-detached houses that date from the 1880s. The first and last houses in Albert Road have ornate triangular pedimented gables
9/2/018/0074/004	8 Grove Road, Mowbray, Cape Town	Type of site: Terraced House. These nine houses form part of a unique block consisting of two terraced rows of identical late Victorian double-storeyed semi-detached houses that date from the 1880s. The first and last houses in Albert Road have ornate triangular pedimented gables	Cape Town, Mowbray	The Cape	Provincial Heritage Site	33°56′46″S 18°28′22″E	Type of site: Terraced House. These nine houses form part of a unique block consisting of two terraced rows of identical late Victorian double-storeyed semi-detached houses that date from the 1880s. The first and last houses in Albert Road have ornate triangular pedimented gables
9/2/018/0074/005	10 Grove Road, Mowbray, Cape Town	Type of site: Terraced House. These nine houses form part of a unique block consisting of two terraced rows of identical late Victorian double-storeyed semi-detached houses that date from the 1880s. The first and last houses in Albert Road have ornate triangular pedimented gables	Cape Town, Mowbray	The Cape	Provincial Heritage Site	33°56′46″S 18°28′21″E	Type of site: Terraced House. These nine houses form part of a unique block consisting of two terraced rows of identical late Victorian double-storeyed semi-detached houses that date from the 1880s. The first and last houses in Albert Road have ornate triangular pedimented gables
9/2/018/0074/006	12 Grove Road, Mowbray, Cape Town	Type of site: Terraced House. These nine houses form part of a unique block consisting of two terraced rows of identical late Victorian double-storeyed semi-detached houses that date from the 1880s. The first and last houses in Albert Road have ornate triangular pedimented gables	Cape Town, Mowbray	The Cape	Provincial Heritage Site	33°56′46″S 18°28′21″E	Type of site: Terraced House. These nine houses form part of a unique block consisting of two terraced rows of identical late Victorian double-storeyed semi-detached houses that date from the 1880s. The first and last houses in Albert Road have ornate triangular pedimented gables
9/2/018/0075	Grove House, 4 Grove Street, Green Point, Cape Town	Grove House in its present form dates from the late nineteenth century. As such it is a good example of Victorian architecture.	Cape Town, Green Point	The Cape	Provincial Heritage Site	33°54′31″S 18°24′20″E	Grove House in its present form dates from the late nineteenth century. As such it is a good example of Victorian architecture.
9/2/018/0076	St Peter's Cemetery, Main Road, Mowbray, Cape Town	Type of site: Graveyard.	Cape Town, Mowbray	The Cape	Register	33°56′32″S 18°28′03″E	Type of site: Graveyard.
9/2/018/0077	Ruth Prowse School of Art, Elson Road, Woodstock, Cape Town	This historic complex of buildings, of which the core of the original dwelling-house dates from the eighteenth century, was built on land originally granted in 1666 to Hendrik Lacus. The group of buildings is at present being used by the Ruth Prowse Art C Type of site: School of Art Previous use: House. Current use: College.	Cape Town, Woodstock	The Cape	Provincial Heritage Site	33°55′57″S 18°27′17″E	This historic complex of buildings, of which the core of the original dwelling-house dates from the eighteenth century, was built on land originally granted in 1666 to Hendrik Lacus. The group of buildings is at present being used by the Ruth Prowse Art C Type of site: School of Art Previous use: House. Current use: College.
9/2/018/0081	Mowbray Town Hall, 129 - 130 Main Road, Cape Town	Brick and terracotta This impressive town hall with its Flemish Renaissance features was designed by the architect J. C. Tully of Tully and Waters and erected in 1900. Type of site: Town Hall Previous use: Town hall.	Cape Town, Mowbray	The Cape	Provincial Heritage Site	33°56′57″S 18°28′16″E	Brick and terracotta This impressive town hall with its Flemish Renaissance features was designed by the architect J. C. Tully of Tully and Waters and erected in 1900. Type of site: Town Hall Previous use: Town hall.
9/2/018/0083	20 Sydney Street, Green Point, Cape Town			Cape Town		33°54′30″S 18°24′24″E	Upload Photo
9/2/018/0084	SALT RIVER/WOODSTOCK, GENERAL			Cape Town			Upload Photo
9/2/018/0090	22 St John's Street, Sea Point, Cape Town			Cape Town		33°55′09″S 18°23′22″E	Upload Photo
9/2/018/0099	SA Glass Company, cnr Lower Collingwood Road & Oak Street, Observatory			Cape Town		33°56′10″S 18°28′17″E	Upload Photo
9/2/018/0108	Ons Huisie, Bloubergstrand, Cape Town	This cottage which for many years was the property of the Stadler family, is a typical example of the simpler form of vernacular architectural style found on the coastal areas of the Western Cape. The periodic additions, the plain side gables and the ove Type of site: House.	Cape Town, Bloubergstrand	The Cape	Provincial Heritage Site	33°47′58″S 18°27′32″E	This cottage which for many years was the property of the Stadler family, is a typical example of the simpler form of vernacular architectural style found on the coastal areas of the Western Cape. The periodic additions, the plain side gables and the ove Type of site: House.
9/2/018/0109	The New Laboratory, Green Point, Cape Town		Cape Town, Green Point	The Cape	Provincial Heritage Site	33°54′14″S 18°24′51″E	Upload Photo
9/2/018/0112	Glen Country Club, Victoria Road, Clifton			Cape Town			Upload Photo
9/2/018/0116/001	Zonnebloem Cottages, Cambridge Street, Woodstock, Cape Town	These farm labourer cottages were Victorianised in the early nineteenth century and together with the Zonnebloem College complex form an integral part of an historic area within the City of Cape Town.	Cape Town, Woodstock	The Cape	Provincial Heritage Site	33°55′31″S 18°25′26″E	Upload Photo
9/2/018/0129	ROSEBANK LOCAL AREA GENERAL			Cape Town			Upload Photo
9/2/018/0130	"Bingley", 105 Victoria Road, Camps Bay, Cape Town			Cape Town		33°56′54″S 18°22′44″E	Upload Photo
9/2/018/0136	St. Mary's Church, Albert Road, Woodstock, Cape Town			Cape Town		33°55′36″S 18°26′47″E	Upload Photo
9/2/018/0147	Klein Zoar, 4 Wemys Street, Brooklyn, Cape Town	This type of pioneers house according to its structure and architectural features probably dates back to the 18th century and as such is representative of the old vernacular architectural style. According to tradition "Klein Zoar" is the former homestead Type of site: House Current use: House.	Cape Town, Brooklyn	The Cape	Provincial Heritage Site	33°54′06″S 18°28′59″E	This type of pioneers house according to its structure and architectural features probably dates back to the 18th century and as such is representative of the old vernacular architectural style. According to tradition "Klein Zoar" is the former homestead Type of site: House Current use: House.
9/2/018/0148	OBSERVATORY, GENERAL			Cape Town			Upload Photo
9/2/018/0153	Groote Schuur Hospital, Observatory, Cape Town	Main article: Groote Schuur Hospital Type of site: Hospital. Although the facade of the building is an important example of union architecture, groote Schuur Hospital is best known as a landmark, both physically, and symbolically in terms of world medical history.	Cape Town, Observatory	The Cape	Provincial Heritage Site	33°56′28″S 18°27′42″E	Type of site: Hospital. Although the facade of the building is an important example of union architecture, groote Schuur Hospital is best known as a landmark, both physically, and symbolically in terms of world medical history. Media related to Groote Schuur Hospital at Wikimedia Commons
9/2/018/0155	Mowbray Hotel, cnr Rhodes Avenue & Main Road, Mowbray			Cape Town		33°56′59″S 18°28′18″E	Upload Photo
9/2/018/0157	President Hotel Site, Sea Point, Cape Town			Cape Town		33°55′25″S 18°22′46″E	Upload Photo
9/2/018/0164	Old Military Camp Site, Green Point, Cape Town			Cape Town			Upload Photo
9/2/018/0166	1 Bellevue Road, Sea Point, Cape Town			Cape Town		33°54′54″S 18°23′32″E	Upload Photo
9/2/018/0167	SEA POINT LOCAL AREA, GENERAL			Cape Town			Upload Photo
9/2/018/0169	Vredehoek Tin Mine, Devil's Peak, Cape Town			Cape Town			Upload Photo
9/2/018/0171	Rietvlei, Milnerton			Cape Town			Upload Photo
9/2/018/0172	3 Lincoln Road, Sea Point, Cape Town			Cape Town		33°54′51″S 18°23′25″E	Upload Photo
9/2/018/0173	YMCA, Trill Road, Observatory, Cape Town			Cape Town		33°56′17″S 18°28′24″E	Upload Photo
9/2/018/0174	Church of St. Luke the Evangelist, Salt River, Cape Town			Cape Town		33°55′46″S 18°27′47″E	Upload Photo
9/2/018/0176	Lord Milner Hotel, 37 Milner Road, Woodstock, Cape Town			Cape Town		33°55′59″S 18°27′12″E	Upload Photo
9/2/018/0185	Old Municipal Hall, Jansen Street, Milnerton, Cape Town	This unique hall, which was later known as the Casino, dates from 1904 and was originally erected as a concert and dance hall. In particular, the special sunken dance floor is noteworthy. Type of site: Town Hall.	Cape Town, Milnerton	The Cape	Provincial Heritage Site	33°53′07″S 18°29′37″E	This unique hall, which was later known as the Casino, dates from 1904 and was originally erected as a concert and dance hall. In particular, the special sunken dance floor is noteworthy. Type of site: Town Hall.
9/2/018/0206	Burial Sites, Somerset Rd Precinct (Prestwich), Green Point, Cape Town			Cape Town		33°55′03″S 18°25′10″E	Upload Photo
9/2/018/0211	Westoe, Mowbray, Cape Town	Westoe adjoins Coornhoop on its northern side; the land it occupies was a part of the Coornhoop farm. In 1785 the owner of Coornhoop, Helena Jonasse, widow of Claas Coert, bequeathed the old farm jointly to three men. They immediately divided it into three Type of site: House. This property, which came into the possession of Francois Pieter de Necker in 1785, originally formed part of the farm Coornhoop. The Cape Dutch house known as Westoe, which was erected shortly afterwards by De Necker, was restored in 1967. The outbuildin	Cape Town, Mowbray	The Cape	Provincial Heritage Site	33°56′32″S 18°28′29″E	Upload Photo
9/2/018/0212	Koornhoop dovecot, Dixon Road, Mowbray, Cape Town			Cape Town			
9/2/018/0212-001	Dovecot, Koornhoop, Dixon Road, Mowbray, Cape Town	To the left of the wagon road and five kilometres from the Fort, in what is now called Mowbray Jan van Riebeeck granted land between February, 1657 and February 1658, to fourteen free burghers. He was forced to build a row of little forts or redoubts along Type of site: Dovecote.	Cape Town, Mowbray	The Cape	Provincial Heritage Site	33°56′36″S 18°28′31″E	To the left of the wagon road and five kilometres from the Fort, in what is now called Mowbray Jan van Riebeeck granted land between February, 1657 and February 1658, to fourteen free burghers. He was forced to build a row of little forts or redoubts along Type of site: Dovecote.
9/2/018/0218	Wrensch House, 77 Lower Wrensch Road, Observatory, Cape Town	This is a Georgianised H-shaped Cape—Dutch house. The land it occupies is of unknown origin which was probably added to the Coornhoop farm in 1741. Later in the eighteenth century the land was acquired by C. Rossouw, who purchased the northern part of the . This building complex, with its Cape-Dutch, Georgian and Victorian features forms a unique architectural unit. The main building as well as some of the outbuildings date from the last quarter of the eighteenth century.	Cape Town, Observatory	The Cape	Provincial Heritage Site	33°56′23″S 18°28′27″E	Upload Photo
9/2/018/0221	GREEN POINT, CAPE TOWN, GENERAL			Cape Town			Upload Photo
9/2/018/0229	Treaty Tree, Woodstock, Cape Town	Main article: Battle of Blaauwberg This site and the tree are historically related to the second British occupation of the Cape in 1806. In a building which stood adjacent to this land the capitulation conditions were signed on 10 January 1806, whereby the property of the Batavian Gover in 1803 England who had occupied the Cape Colony for seven years, gave it back to the Netherlands which was then known as the Batavian Republic. General J. W. Janssens was appointed as governor. Barely three years later England again sent a fleet to occupy. Type of site: Tree. In a building which stood adjacent to this land the capitulation conditions were signed on 10 January 1806, whereby the property of the Batavian Government at the Cape was transferred to the commanders of the British forces, Maj-Genl. Sir David Baird a	Cape Town, Woodstock	The Cape	Provincial Heritage Site	33°55′34″S 18°27′05″E	This site and the tree are historically related to the second British occupation of the Cape in 1806. In a building which stood adjacent to this land the capitulation conditions were signed on 10 January 1806, whereby the property of the Batavian Gover in 1803 England who had occupied the Cape Colony for seven years, gave it back to the Netherlands which was then known as the Batavian Republic. General J. W. Janssens was appointed as governor. Barely three years later England again sent a fleet to occupy. Type of site: Tree. In a building which stood adjacent to this land the capitulation conditions were signed on 10 January 1806, whereby the property of the Batavian Government at the Cape was transferred to the commanders of the British forces, Maj-Genl. Sir David Baird a
9/2/018/0230	Central Redoubt, Trafalgar Park, Woodstock Cape Town			Cape Town			Upload Photo
9/2/018/0232	Geological exposure, Sea Point, Cape Town	Below the sea wall at the extreme southern end of Beach Road in Sea Point the rocks show remarkable and unusual geological features. Here one may observe an outstanding example of the contact between dark shales of the Malmesbury Series and Type of site: Geological site or area.	Cape Town, Sea Point	The Cape	Provincial Heritage Site	33°55′15″S 18°22′43″E	Upload Photo
9/2/018/0233	The Glen Country Club, Scenic Reserve, Clifton, Cape Townr	The development and occupation of the steep and rocky inaccessible western coast of the Cape Peninsula took place later and more slowly than the exploitation of the fertile areas of Rondebosch and Wynberg. When, however, this development began, it threat Type of site: Club.	Cape Town, Clifton	The Cape	Provincial Heritage Site	33°56′37″S 18°22′21″E	Upload Photo
9/2/018/0238	Earles Dyke Area, The Glen, Camps Bay, Cape Town			Cape Town			Upload Photo
9/2/018/0241	Molenvliet House, Molenvliet Street, Mowbray, Cape Town	The land on which this house is situated originally formed part of the farm Coornhoop, which was granted to Thielman Hendricks in 1661. The subdivided piece of land was given to Francois Pieter de Necker in 1785. De Necker was presumably the builder of th Type of site: Farmhouse. This property originally formed part of the farm Coornhoop, which was granted to Thieman Hendricks in 1661. The predominantly Cape Dutch house was formerly a barn for the Westoe building complex and dates from the early nineteenth century.	Cape Town, Mowbray	The Cape	Provincial Heritage Site	33°56′33″S 18°28′31″E	Upload Photo
9/2/018/0243/2	Conservation areas, Lower Gardens, Cape Town			Cape Town			Upload Photo
9/2/018/0243/3	Conservation areas, Woodstock, Salt River & Walmer Estate, Cape Town			Cape Town			Upload Photo
9/2/018/0243/4	Conservation areas, Observatory, Cape Town			Cape Town			Upload Photo
9/2/018/0243/5	Conservation areas, Loader Street, Cape Town			Cape Town			Upload Photo
9/2/018/0243/6	Conservation areas, Green Point & Sea Point, Cape Town			Cape Town			Upload Photo
9/2/018/0245	Royal Observatory complex, Observatory, Cape Town			Cape Town	National Heritage Site	33°56′05″S 18°28′38″E	
9/2/018/0252	Dutch Reformed Church, Regent Square, Woodstock, Cape Town			Cape Town		33°55′42″S 18°27′04″E	Upload Photo
9/2/018/0254	MOUILLE POINT LOCAL AREA, GENERAL			Cape Town			Upload Photo
9/2/018/0256	5-7 Bellevue Road, Sea Point, Cape Town			Cape Town		33°54′54″S 18°23′32″E	Upload Photo
9/2/018/0256/001	Salisbury House, 5 Bellevue Road, Sea Point, Cape Town		Cape Town, Sea Point	The Cape	Provincial Heritage Site	33°54′55″S 18°23′33″E	Upload Photo
9/2/018/0256/2	7 Bellevue Road, Sea Point, Cape Town			Cape Town		33°54′54″S 18°23′32″E	Upload Photo
9/2/018/0257	Camp Site of Survivors of the Haarlem, 1647, Milnerton			Cape Town			
9/2/018/0259	Congregational Church, Sea Point, Cape Town			Cape Town		33°54′50″S 18°23′27″E	Upload Photo
9/2/018/0260	Culemborg-Black River Site, Cape Town			Cape Town			Upload Photo
9/2/018/0261	MOWBRAY, CAPE TOWN, GENERAL			Cape Town			Upload Photo
9/2/018/0264/04	87 Chiappini Street, Bo-Kaap, Cape Town			Cape Town		33°55′09″S 18°24′58″E	
9/2/018/0265	Tana Baru Muslim Burial Ground, Longmarket Street, Bo-Kaap, Cape Town			Cape Town			Upload Photo
9/2/018/0269	Oude Molen Building, Valkenberg Hospital, Observatory			Cape Town		33°56′15″S 18°28′48″E	Upload Photo
9/2/018/0270	St James the Great Church, 12 St James Road, Sea Point, Cape Town			Cape Town		33°54′36″S 18°23′37″E	Upload Photo
9/2/018/0272	LLUNDUDNO LOCAL AREA, GENERAL			Cape Town			Upload Photo
9/2/018/0273	1-11 Albert Road, Mowbray, Cape Town District			Cape Town		33°56′44″S 18°28′21″E	
9/2/018/0273/001	1 Albert Road, Mowbray, Cape Town	These nine houses form part of a unique block consisting of two terraced rows of identical late Victorian double-storeyed semi-detached houses that date from the 1880s. The first and last houses in Albert Road have ornate triangular pedimented gables with This property forms part of two rows of double-storeyed Victorian terrace houses which stand back to back on a block shared by the Mowbray Presbyterian Church. Each row consists of six units which are semi-detached. Besides slight variations in the filigr	Cape Town, Mowbray	The Cape	Provincial Heritage Site	33°56′44″S 18°28′22″E	These nine houses form part of a unique block consisting of two terraced rows of identical late Victorian double-storeyed semi-detached houses that date from the 1880s. The first and last houses in Albert Road have ornate triangular pedimented gables with This property forms part of two rows of double-storeyed Victorian terrace houses which stand back to back on a block shared by the Mowbray Presbyterian Church. Each row consists of six units which are semi-detached. Besides slight variations in the filigr
9/2/018/0273/002	3 Albert Road, Mowbray, Cape Town	This property forms part of a unique block consisting of two terraced rows of identical late Victorian double-storey semi-detached houses that date from the 1880s. The first and last houses in Albert Road have ornate triangular pedimented gables with cart This property forms part of two rows of double-storeyed Victorian terrace houses which stand back to back on a block shared by the Mowbray Presbyterian Church. Each row consists of six units which are semi-detached. Besides slight variations in the filigr Type of site: Terraced House.	Cape Town, Mowbray	The Cape	Provincial Heritage Site	33°56′44″S 18°28′22″E	This property forms part of a unique block consisting of two terraced rows of identical late Victorian double-storey semi-detached houses that date from the 1880s. The first and last houses in Albert Road have ornate triangular pedimented gables with cart This property forms part of two rows of double-storeyed Victorian terrace houses which stand back to back on a block shared by the Mowbray Presbyterian Church. Each row consists of six units which are semi-detached. Besides slight variations in the filigr Type of site: Terraced House.
9/2/018/0273/003	5 Albert Road, Mowbray, Cape Town	This property forms part of a unique block consisting of two terraced rows of identical late Victorian double-storey semi-detached houses that date from the 1880s. The first and last houses in Albert Road have ornate triangular pedimented gables with cart This property forms part of two rows of double-storeyed Victorian terrace houses which stand back to back on a block shared by the Mowbray Presbyterian Church. Each row consists of six units which are semi-detached. Besides slight variations in the filigr Type of site: Terraced House.	Cape Town, Mowbray	The Cape	Provincial Heritage Site	33°56′44″S 18°28′21″E	This property forms part of a unique block consisting of two terraced rows of identical late Victorian double-storey semi-detached houses that date from the 1880s. The first and last houses in Albert Road have ornate triangular pedimented gables with cart This property forms part of two rows of double-storeyed Victorian terrace houses which stand back to back on a block shared by the Mowbray Presbyterian Church. Each row consists of six units which are semi-detached. Besides slight variations in the filigr Type of site: Terraced House.
9/2/018/0273/004	7 Albert Road, Mowbray, Cape Town	This property forms part of a unique block consisting of two terraced rows of identical late Victorian double-storey semi-detached houses that date from the 1880s. The first and last houses in Albert Road have ornate triangular pedimented gables with cart This property forms part of two rows of double-storeyed Victorian terrace houses which stand back to back on a block shared by the Mowbray Presbyterian Church. Each row consists of six units which are semi-detached. Besides slight variations in the filigr Type of site: Terraced House.	Cape Town, Mowbray	The Cape	Provincial Heritage Site	33°56′44″S 18°28′21″E	This property forms part of a unique block consisting of two terraced rows of identical late Victorian double-storey semi-detached houses that date from the 1880s. The first and last houses in Albert Road have ornate triangular pedimented gables with cart This property forms part of two rows of double-storeyed Victorian terrace houses which stand back to back on a block shared by the Mowbray Presbyterian Church. Each row consists of six units which are semi-detached. Besides slight variations in the filigr Type of site: Terraced House.
9/2/018/0273/005	9 Albert Road, Mowbray, Cape Town	This property forms part of a unique block consisting of two terraced rows of identical late Victorian double-storey semi-detached houses that date from the 1880s. The first and last houses in Albert Road have ornate triangular pedimented gables with cart This property forms part of two rows of double-storeyed Victorian terrace houses which stand back to back on a block shared by the Mowbray Presbyterian Church. Each row consists of six units which are semi-detached. Besides slight variations in the filigr Type of site: Terraced House.	Cape Town, Mowbray	The Cape	Provincial Heritage Site	33°56′45″S 18°28′21″E	This property forms part of a unique block consisting of two terraced rows of identical late Victorian double-storey semi-detached houses that date from the 1880s. The first and last houses in Albert Road have ornate triangular pedimented gables with cart This property forms part of two rows of double-storeyed Victorian terrace houses which stand back to back on a block shared by the Mowbray Presbyterian Church. Each row consists of six units which are semi-detached. Besides slight variations in the filigr Type of site: Terraced House.
9/2/018/0273/006	11 Albert Road, Mowbray, Cape Town	These nine houses form part of a unique block consisting of two terraced rows of identical late Victorian double-storeyed semi-detached houses that date from the 1880s. The first and last houses in Albert Road have ornate triangular pedimented gables wi This property forms part of two rows of double-storeyed Victorian terrace houses which stand back to back on a block shared by the Mowbray Presbyterian Church. Each row consists of six units which are semi-detached. Besides slight variations in the filigr	Cape Town, Mowbray	The Cape	Provincial Heritage Site	33°56′45″S 18°28′21″E	These nine houses form part of a unique block consisting of two terraced rows of identical late Victorian double-storeyed semi-detached houses that date from the 1880s. The first and last houses in Albert Road have ornate triangular pedimented gables wi This property forms part of two rows of double-storeyed Victorian terrace houses which stand back to back on a block shared by the Mowbray Presbyterian Church. Each row consists of six units which are semi-detached. Besides slight variations in the filigr
9/2/018/0276	3 Long Street, Mowbray, Cape Town			Cape Town		33°56′51″S 18°28′25″E	Upload Photo
9/2/018/0278	MAITLAND LOCAL AREA, GENERAL			Cape Town			Upload Photo
9/2/018/0278/1	Erf 154483, Garden Village Primary, Maitland, Cape Town			Cape Town		33°56′02″S 18°29′08″E	Upload Photo
9/2/018/0279	Alexandra Institute, Maitland cape Town			Cape Town			Upload Photo Media related to De Nieuwe Molen, Cape Town at Wikimedia Commons
9/2/018/0279/001	De Nieuwe Molen, Alexandra Institute, Maitland, Cape Town	The Nieuwe Molen, with its bullet-shaped tower, was erected in the years 1780-1782. In 1928 it was converted into a church and at present it serves as a music room for the Alexandra Institute. 10/2/584. Type of site: Industrial Previous use: Mill.	Cape Town, Maitland	The Cape	Provincial Heritage Site	33°55′57″S 18°28′56″E	The Nieuwe Molen, with its bullet-shaped tower, was erected in the years 1780-1782. In 1928 it was converted into a church and at present it serves as a music room for the Alexandra Institute. 10/2/584. Type of site: Industrial Previous use: Mill. Media related to De Nieuwe Molen, Cape Town at Wikimedia Commons
9/2/018/0280	Maitland Cemetery, Voortekker Road, Maitland, Cape Town District			Cape Town		33°55′06″S 18°31′19″E	Upload Photo
9/2/018/0280/1	Garden of Remembrance, Maitland Cemetery			Cape Town			Upload Photo
9/2/018/0280/2	Memorial to Slave Burial Site, Maitland Cemetery			Cape Town			Upload Photo
9/2/018/0281	Mile Stone 1V, 282 Voortrekker Road, Maitland, Cape Town			Cape Town		33°55′24″S 18°29′20″E	Upload Photo
9/2/018/0283	CLIFTON LOCAL AREA, GENERAL			Cape Town			Upload Photo
9/2/018/0284	Dutch Reformed Church, Main Road, Maitland			Cape Town		33°55′25″S 18°29′07″E	Upload Photo
9/2/018/0286	CAMPS BAY LOCAL AREA, GENERAL			Cape Town			Upload Photo
9/2/018/0290	Trafalgar Park, cnr Searle St & Victoria Rd, Woodstock			Cape Town		33°55′40″S 18°26′27″E	
9/2/018/0290/001	Central Redoubt, Trafalgar Park, Woodstock, Cape Town	This fortress was hastily built in 1781, when an attack by British forces on the Cape was expected. A conical kiln, probably for making bricks, was added some 50 years later. From the beginning of the settlement at the Cape, the commanders were concerned Type of site: Fort. This fortress was hastily built in 1781, when an attack by British forces on the Cape was expected. A conical kiln, probably for making bricks, was added some 50 years later.	Cape Town, Woodstock	The Cape	Provincial Heritage Site	33°55′47″S 18°26′30″E	This fortress was hastily built in 1781, when an attack by British forces on the Cape was expected. A conical kiln, probably for making bricks, was added some 50 years later. From the beginning of the settlement at the Cape, the commanders were concerned Type of site: Fort. This fortress was hastily built in 1781, when an attack by British forces on the Cape was expected. A conical kiln, probably for making bricks, was added some 50 years later.
9/2/018/0295	BANTRY BAY LOCAL			Cape Town			Upload Photo
9/2/018/0296	MELKBOSSTRAND LOCAL AREA			Cape Town			Upload Photo
9/2/018/0298	The Homestead ("Casa Felicia"), 60 Llandudno Road, Llandudno			Cape Town	Register (Pending)	34°00′29″S 18°20′37″E	Upload Photo
9/2/018/0299	The South African Astronomical Observatory, Mowbray			Cape Town		33°56′04″S 18°28′38″E	
9/2/108/0010/12	Bungalow 66, Clifton, Cape Town		Clifton	Cape Town			Upload Photo
HM\CAPE TOWN METRO\NEWLANDS \DE HEL FOREST	De Hel Forest		Cape Town	The Cape	Provincial Heritage Site	34°00′46″S 18°25′13″E	Media related to De Hel Nature Area at Wikimedia Commons
HM\CAPE TOWN METRO\SALT RIVER \COMMUNITY HOUSE	Community House	Main article: Community House (Salt River, Cape Town)	Cape Town, Salt River	The Cape	Provincial Heritage Site	33°55′48″S 18°27′27″E	Media related to Community House (Salt River, Cape Town) at Wikimedia Commons
9/2/018/0129-008	Rex Trueform Factory Complex		Cape Town, Salt River	The Cape	Provincial Heritage Site	33°55′58″S 18°27′31″E	
