= Robben Island =

Island in Table Bay, South Africa

Robben Island Robbeneiland
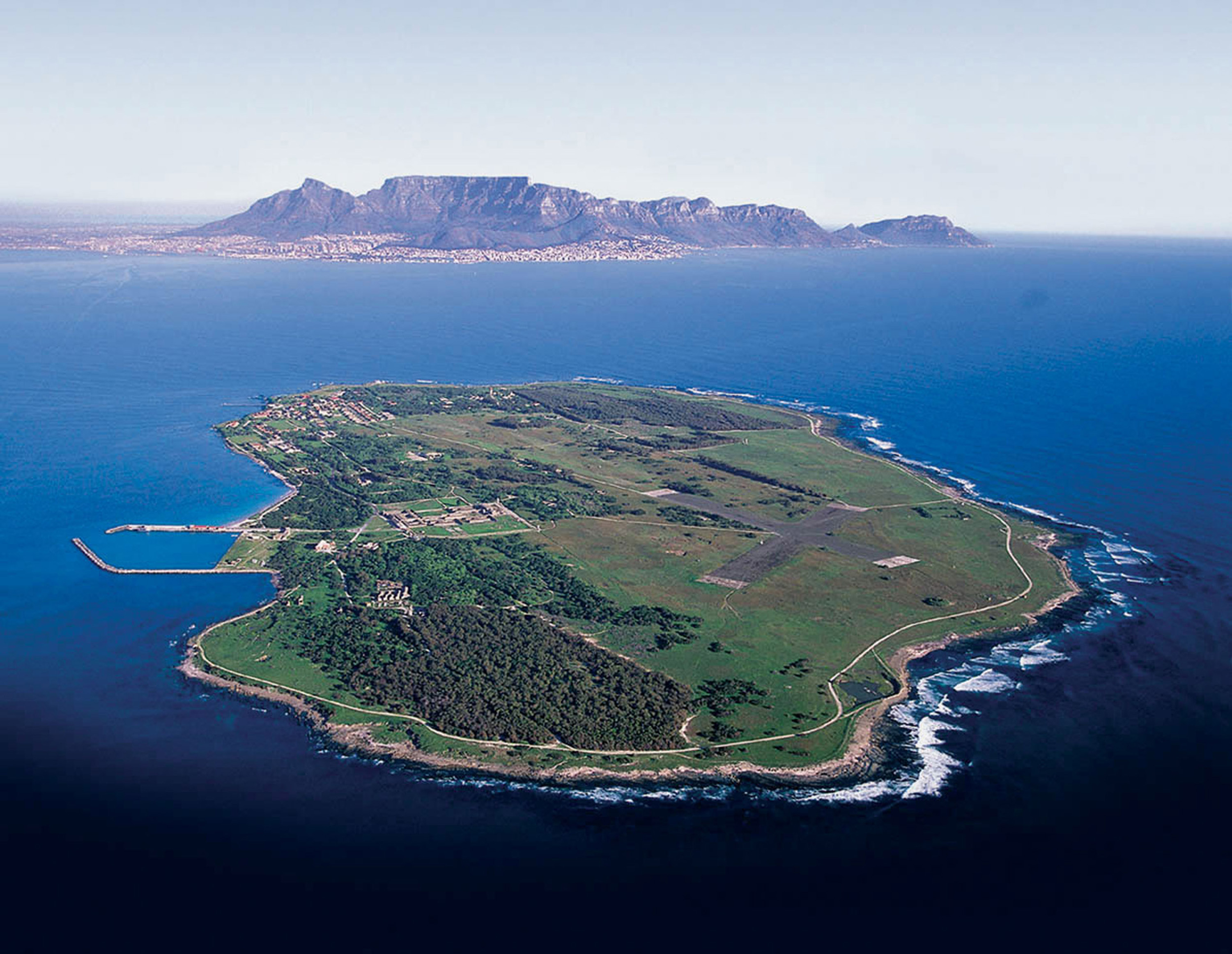
- Robben Island viewed from above

- Location within Western Cape Location within South Africa
- Coordinates: 33°48′18″S 18°22′12″E
- Country: South Africa
- Province: Western Cape
- Municipality: City of Cape Town

Area
  - Total: 5.18 km^{2} (2.00 sq mi)

Population (2011)
  - Total: 116
  - Density: 22.4/km^{2} (58.0/sq mi)

Racial makeup (2011)
  - Black African: 60.3%
  - Coloured: 23.3%
  - White: 13.8%
  - Other: 2.6%

First languages (2011)
  - Xhosa: 37.9%
  - Afrikaans: 35.3%
  - Zulu: 15.5%
  - English: 7.8%
  - Other: 3.4%
- Time zone: UTC+2 (SAST)
- PO box: 7400

UNESCO World Heritage Site
- Type: Cultural
- Criteria: III, VI
- Designated: 1999 (23rd session)
- Reference no.: 916
- Region: Africa

Robben Island (Dutch: Robbeneiland) is an island in Table Bay, 6.9 kilometers west of the coast of Bloubergstrand, north of Cape Town, South Africa. It takes its name from the archaic Dutch word for seals (robben).

The island is roughly oval in shape, 3.3km long north–south, and 1.9km wide, with an area of 5.1 sq. km. It is flat and only a few metres above sea level, as a result of an ancient erosion event. The higher land, such as Minto Hill, is located towards the south of the island.

Robben Island today is a South African National Heritage Site as well as a UNESCO World Heritage Site.

== History ==
Up to 12,000 years ago, the island was connected to the Cape Peninsula mainland, until rising seawaters created a channel which separated them.

Located at the entrance to Table Bay, 11 km from Cape Town, the island was discovered by Bartolomeu Dias in 1488. It was used by the Portuguese navigators, and later by English and Dutch sailors, as a refueling station.

In 1654, the settlers of the Dutch Cape Colony sheltered their livestock on the island, since the lack of predators offered better protection than on the mainland. The settlers also collected seal skins and boiled oil to supply the needs of the settlement.

Since the end of the 17th century, the island was used for the incarceration of mainly political prisoners. The Dutch settlers were the first to use Robben Island as a prison: the first prisoner was probably Autshumato, in the mid-17th century. Among its early permanent inhabitants were political leaders imprisoned from other Dutch colonies, including the Dutch East Indies. These included the two surviving Malagasy leaders, named in Dutch East India Company records as Massavana and Koesaaij, of the mutiny of Malagasy slaves on the slave ship Meermin. They had been sold to the Dutch East India Company in Madagascar to be enslaved in the Cape Colony. Massavana died three years later, but Koesaaij survived at Robben Island for another 20 years.

After the British Royal Navy captured several Dutch East Indiamen at the battle of Saldanha Bay in the Fourth Anglo-Dutch War in 1781, a boat rowed out to meet the British warships. On board were the "kings of Ternate and Tidore, and the princes of the respective families". The Dutch had long held them on "Isle Robin", but then had moved them to Saldanha Bay.

In 1806, Scottish whaler John Murray opened a whaling station at a sheltered bay on the north-eastern shore of the island, which became known as Murray's Bay. It was adjacent to the site of the present-day Murray's Bay Harbour, which was constructed in 1939–40.

After a failed uprising at Grahamstown in 1819, the fifth of the Xhosa Wars, the British colonial government sentenced African leader Makanda Nxele to life imprisonment on the island. He drowned on the shores of Table Bay after escaping the prison.

The island was also used as a leper colony and animal quarantine station. Since 1845, lepers from the Hemel-en-Aarde (heaven and earth) leper colony near Caledon were moved to Robben Island when Hemel-en-Aarde was found unsuitable. Initially, people were relocated on a voluntary basis, and the lepers were free to leave the island if they so wished. In April 1891, the cornerstones for 11 new buildings to house lepers were laid. After passage of the Leprosy Repression Act in May 1892, admission was no longer voluntary, and the movement of the lepers was restricted. Doctors and scientists did not understand the disease and thought that isolation was the only way to prevent other people from contracting it. Prior to 1892, an average of about 25 lepers a year were admitted to Robben Island, but in 1892 that number rose to 338, and a further 250 were admitted in 1893.

During the Second World War, the island was fortified. BL 9.2-inch guns and 6-inch guns were installed as part of the defences for Cape Town.

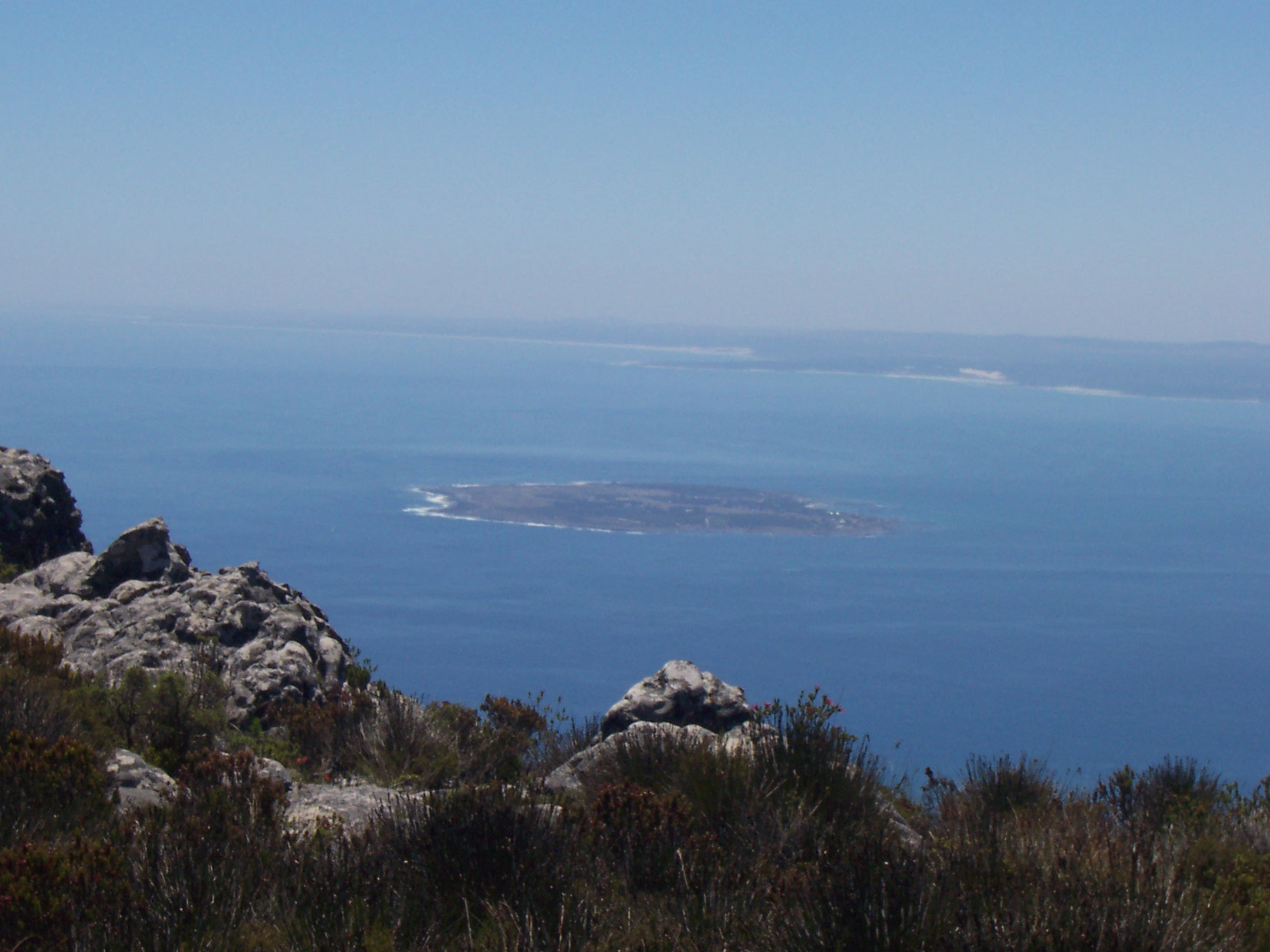
Robben Island as viewed from Table Mountain towards Saldanha Bay.

From 1961 to 1996, Robben Island was used by the South African government to isolate and imprison political dissidents. Notable prisoners included future Presidents Nelson Mandela, Kgalema Motlanthe and Jacob Zuma.

In 1969, the Moturu Kramat, now a sacred site for Muslim pilgrimage on Robben Island, was built to commemorate Sayed Abdurahman Moturu, the sheikh of Madura in Indonesia. Moturu, one of Cape Town's first imams, was exiled in the mid-1740s to the island. He died there in 1754. Muslim political prisoners would pay homage at the shrine before leaving the island.

In 1982, former inmate Indres Naidoo published his book Island in Chains, the first account of prison life on the island.

The maximum security prison for political prisoners closed in 1991. The medium security prison for criminal prisoners was closed in 1996. In 1997 it was converted into a museum and designated a national monument. In 1999 it was recognized as a World Heritage Site.

After the end of apartheid, the island become a popular tourist destination. It is managed by Robben Island Museum (RIM), which operates the site as a living museum. Every year, thousands of visitors take the ferry from the Victoria & Alfred Waterfront in Cape Town for tours of the island and its former prison. Many of the guides are former prisoners. All land on the island is owned by the nation of South Africa, with the exception of the island church. Administratively, Robben Island is a suburb of the City of Cape Town. It is open all year around, weather permitting.

As a tourist attraction in South Africa's national consciousness, today Robben Island is often regarded as "a symbol of oppression" by many black South Africans.

== Access to the island ==
Robben Island is accessible to visitors through tours that depart from Cape Town's waterfront. Tours depart three times a day and take about 3.5 hours, consisting of a ferry trip to and from the island, and a tour of the various historical sites on the island that form part of the Robben Island Museum. These include the island graveyard, the disused lime quarry, Robert Sobukwe's house, the Bluestone quarry, the army and navy bunkers, and the maximum security prison. Nelson Mandela's cell is shown.

== Maritime hazard ==
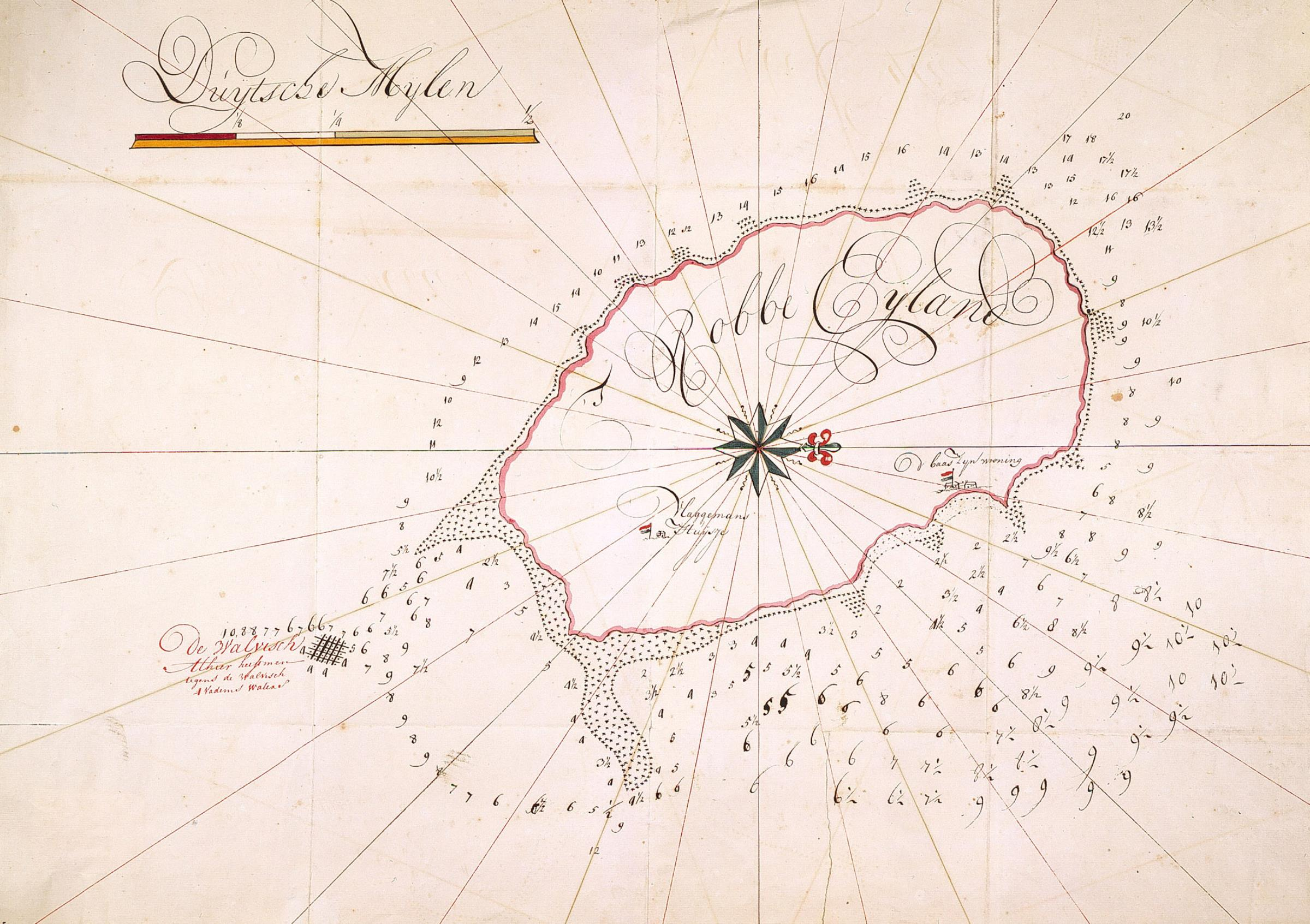
Dutch map of the island, from 1731

Seagoing vessels must take great care navigating near Robben Island and nearby Whale Rock (it does not break the surface) as these pose a danger to shipping. A prevailing rough Atlantic swell surrounds the offshore reefs and the island's jagged coastline. Stricken vessels driven onto rocks are quickly broken up by the powerful surf. A total of 31 vessels are known to have been wrecked around the island.

In 1990, a marine archaeology team from the University of Cape Town began Operation "Sea Eagle". It was an underwater survey that scanned 31 square kilometres (9 square nautical miles) of seabed around Robben Island. The task was made particularly difficult by the strong currents and high waves of these waters. The group found 24 vessels that had sunk around Robben Island. Most wrecks were found in waters less than ten metres (33 ft) deep. The team concluded that poor weather, darkness and fog were the cause of the sinkings.

Maritime wrecks around Robben Island and its surrounding waters include the 17th-century Dutch East Indiaman ships, the Yeanger van Horne (1611), the Shaapejacht (1660), and the Dageraad (1694). Later 19th-century wrecks include several British brigs, including the Gondolier (1836), and the United States clipper, A.H. Stevens (1866). In 1901 the mail steamer SS Tantallon Castle struck rocks off Robben Island in dense fog shortly after leaving Cape Town. After distress cannons were fired from the island, nearby vessels rushed to the rescue. All 120 passengers and crew were taken off the ship before it was broken apart in the swells. A further 17 ships have been wrecked in the 20th century, including British, Spanish, Norwegian and Taiwanese vessels.

=== Robben Island lighthouse ===
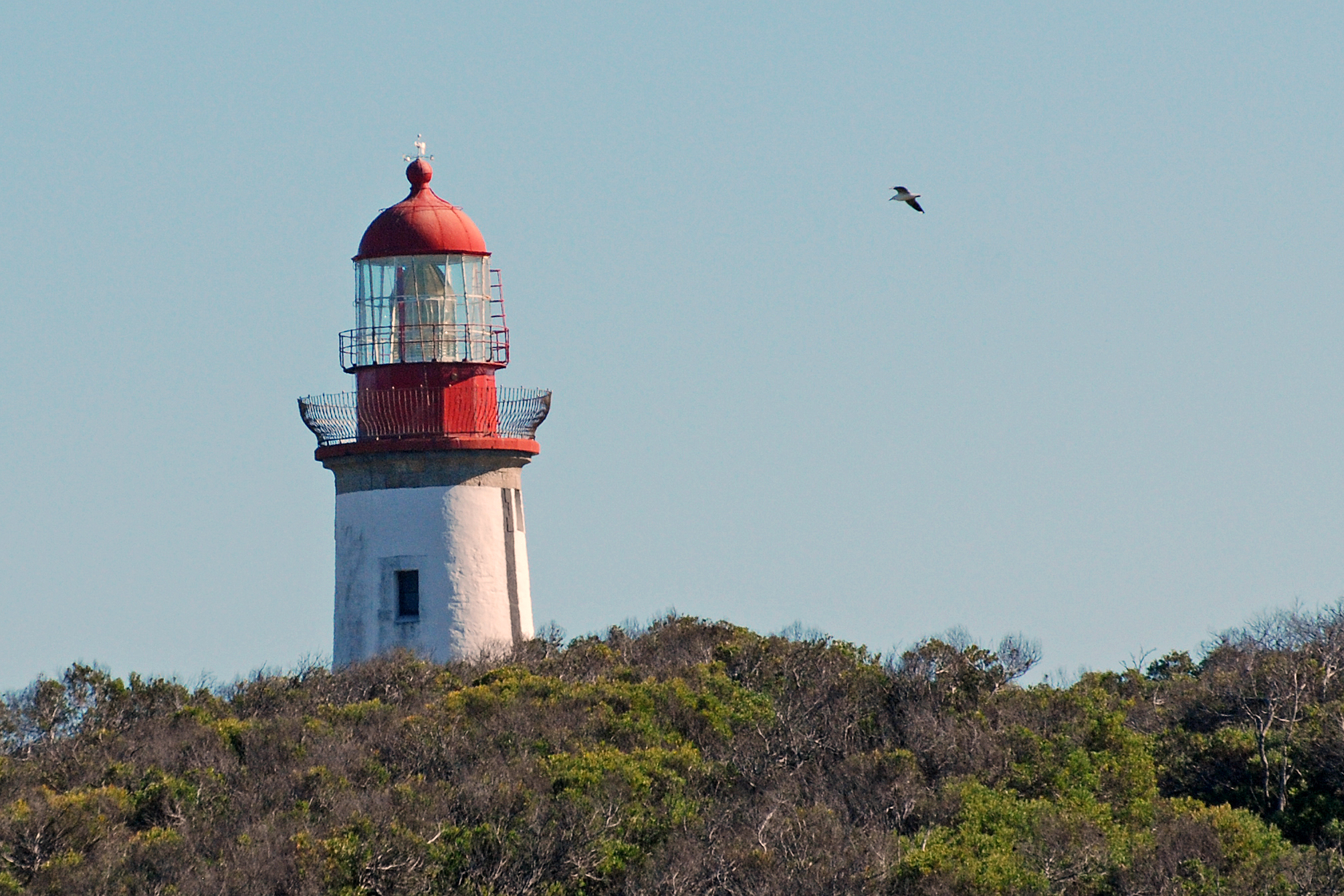
Robben Island Lighthouse

Due to the maritime danger of Robben Island and its near waters, Jan van Riebeeck, the first Dutch colonial administrator in Cape Town in the 1650s, ordered that huge bonfires were to be lit at night on top of Fire Hill, the highest point on the island (now Minto Hill). These were to warn VOC ships that they were approaching the island.

In 1865, Robben Island lighthouse was completed on Minto Hill. The cylindrical masonry tower, which has an attached lightkeeper's house at its base, is 18 metres (59 ft) high with a lantern gallery at the top. In 1938, the lamp was converted to electricity. The lighthouse uses a flashing lantern instead of a revolving lamp; it shines for a duration of 5 seconds every seven seconds. The 46,000-candela beam, visible up to 44 kilometres (24 nmi) away, flashes white light away from Table Bay. A secondary red light acts as a navigation aid for vessels sailing south-southeast.

== Wildlife and conservation ==
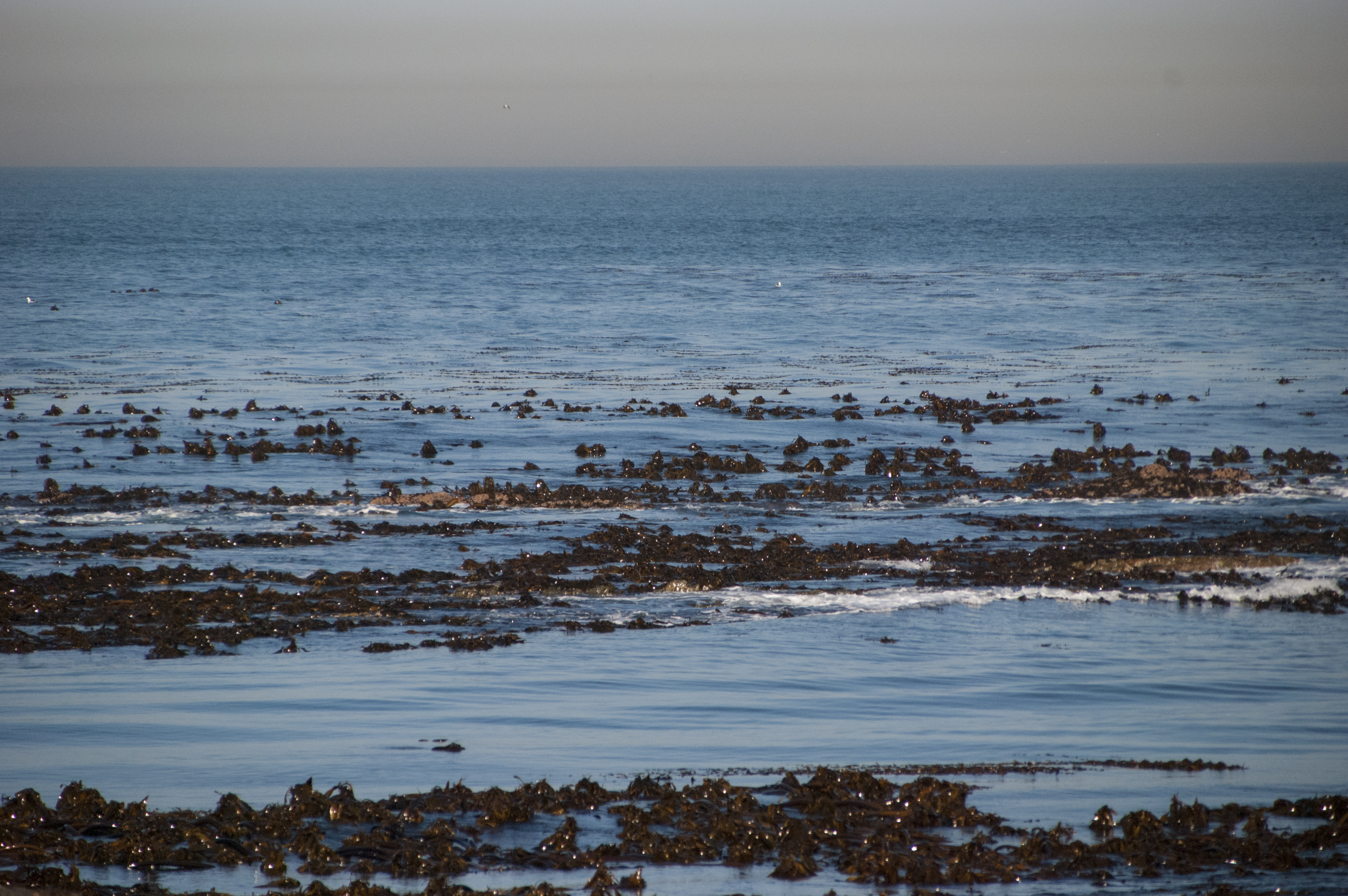
View of Table Bay from Robben Island coast

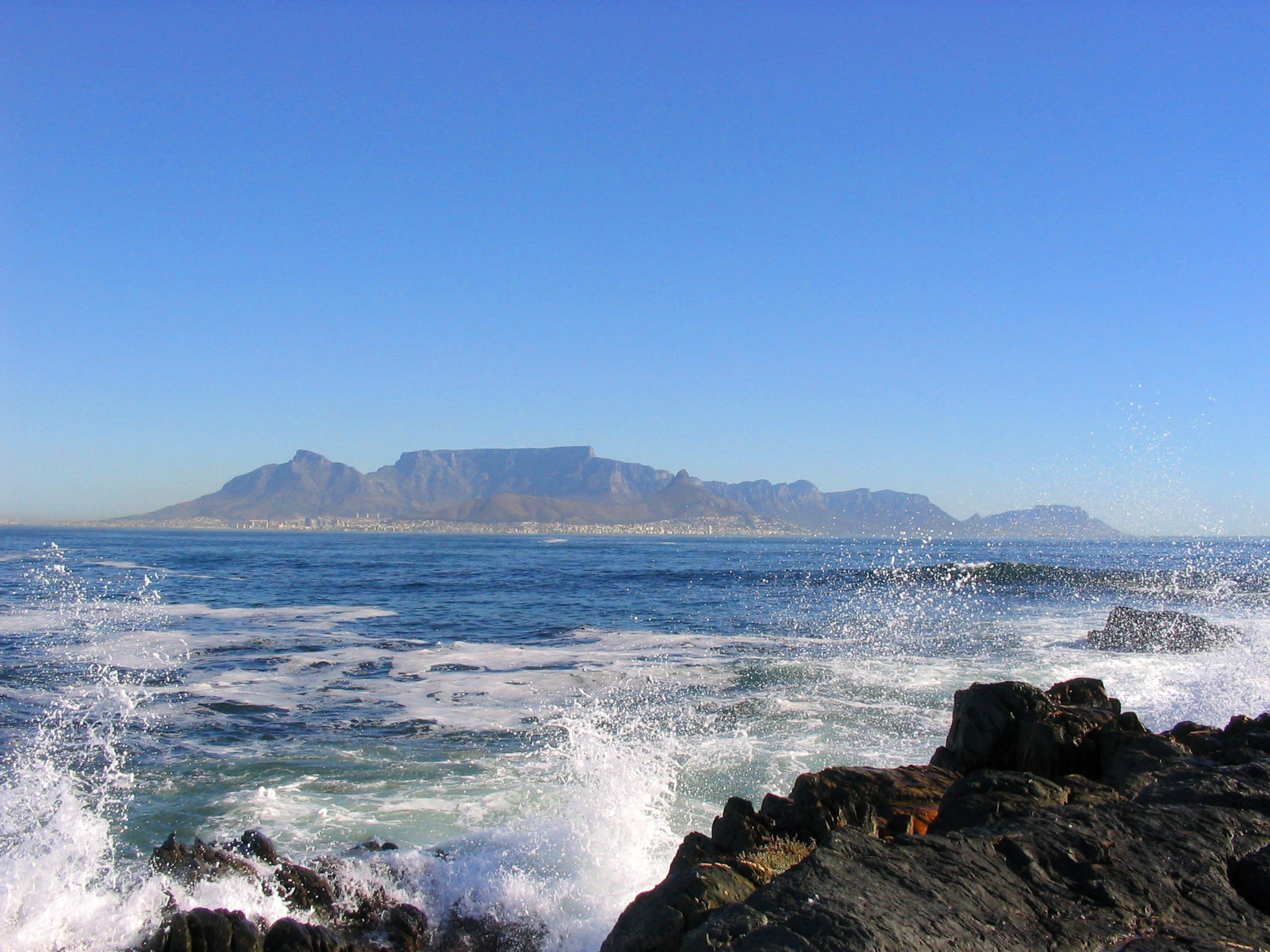
Robben island coast with a view of Table Mountain

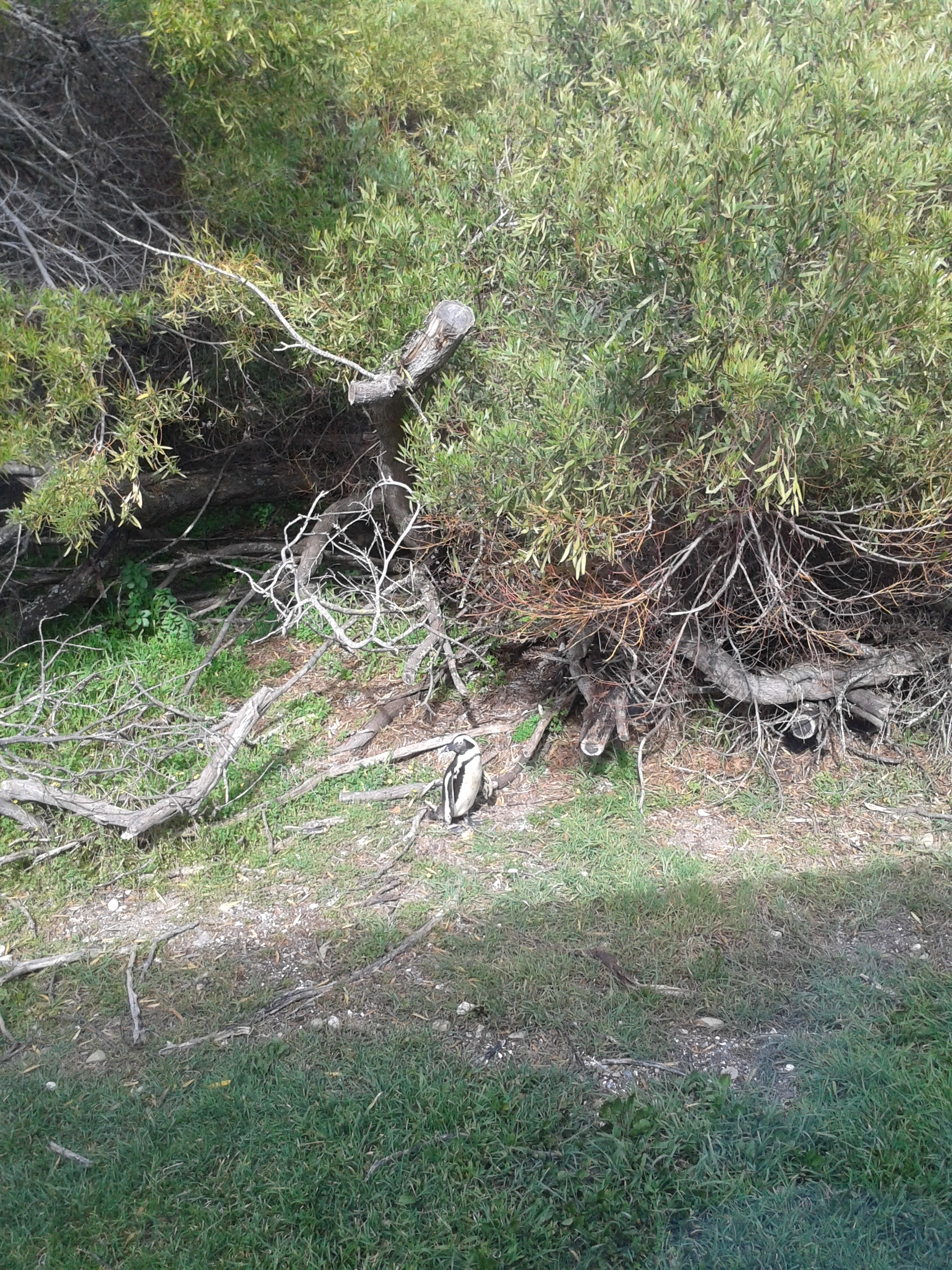
Endangered African penguin on Robben Island, 2015

When the Dutch arrived in the area in 1652, the only large animals on the island were seals and birds, including penguins. In 1654, the settlers released rabbits on the island to provide a ready source of meat for passing ships.

The original colony of African penguins on the island was completely exterminated by 1800. But, since 1983, a new colony has been established there, and the modern island is again an important breeding area for the species. The colony grew to a size of ~16,000 individuals in 2004, before starting to decline in size again. As of 2015, this decline has been continuous (to a colony size of around 3,000 individuals). Such a decline has been found at almost all other African penguin colonies. Its causes are still largely unclear and likely to vary between colonies, but at Robben Island are probably related to a diminishing of the food supply (sardines and anchovies) through competition by fisheries. Easy to see in their natural habitat, the penguins have been a popular tourist attraction.

Around 1958, Lieutenant Peter Klerck, a South African Navy officer serving on the island, introduced various animals. The following extract of an article, written by his son Michael Klerck, who lived on the island from an early age, describes the local fauna:

In the early 21st century, the rabbit population had reached an estimated 25,000, which had become an invasive species, endangering others. Humans are hunting and culling the rabbits to reduce their number.

== Climate change ==
In 2022, the IPCC Sixth Assessment Report included Robben Island in the list of African cultural sites which would be threatened by flooding and coastal erosion by the end of the century, but only if climate change followed RCP 8.5, which is the scenario of high and continually increasing greenhouse gas emissions associated with the warming of over 4 °C., and is no longer considered very likely. The other, more plausible scenarios result in lower warming levels and consequently lower sea level rise: yet, sea levels would continue to increase for about 10,000 years under all of the scenarios. Even if the warming is limited to 1.5 °C, global sea level rise is still expected to exceed 2–3 m (7–10 ft) after 2000 years (and higher warming levels will see larger increases by then), consequently exceeding 2100 levels of sea level rise under RCP 8.5 (~0.75 m (2 ft) with a range of 0.5–1 m (2–3 ft)) well before the year 4000.

== Gallery ==
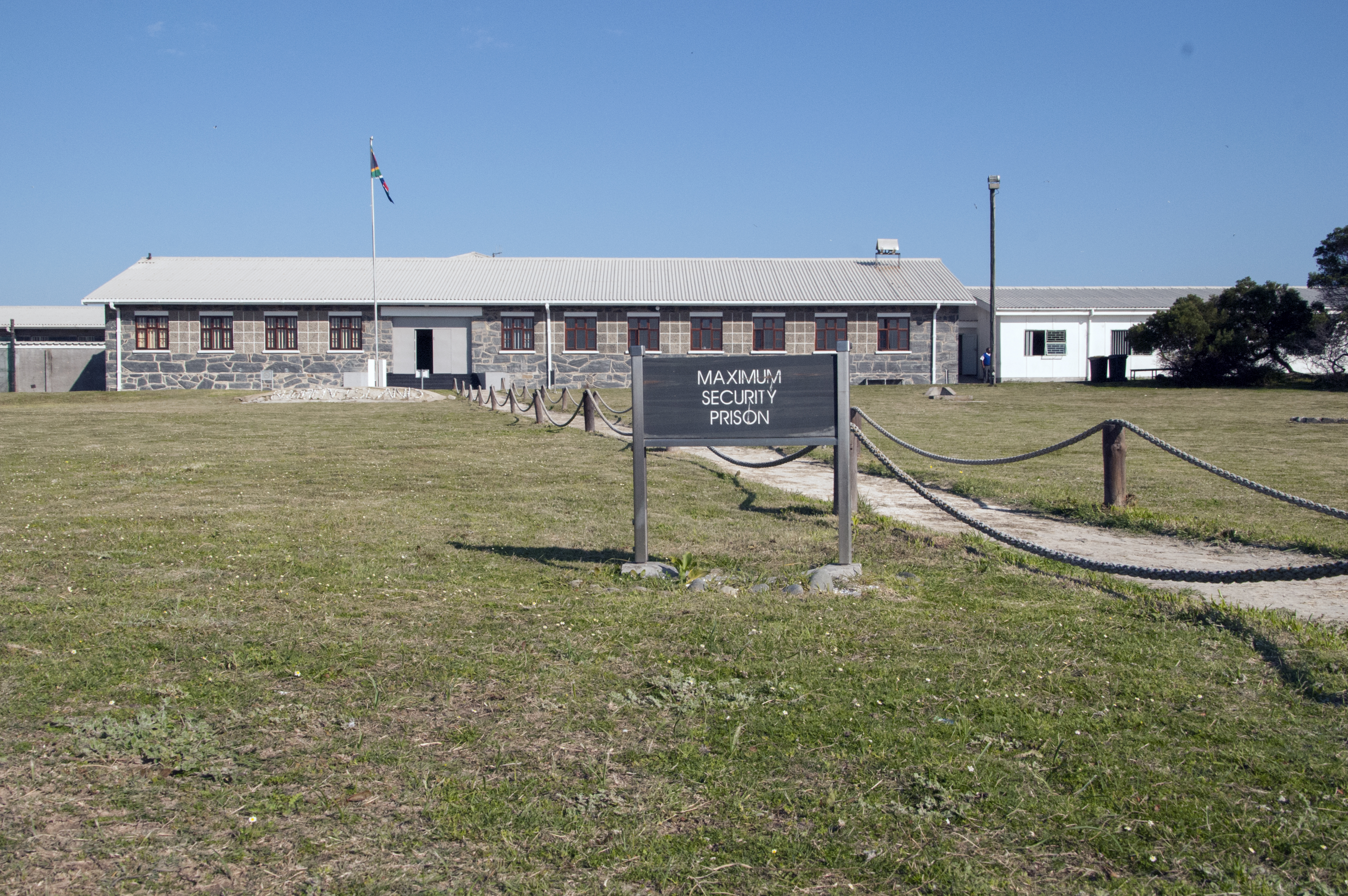
Maximum Security Prison, Robben Island

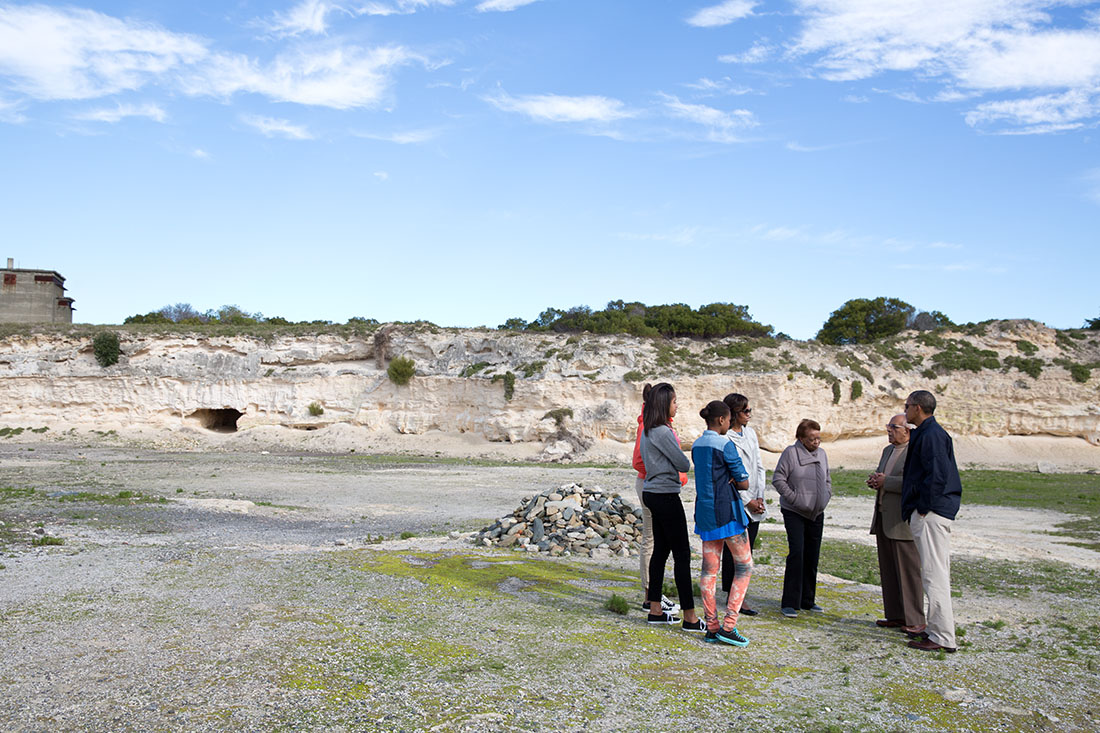
Ahmed Kathrada, who was imprisoned in Robben Island between 1964 and 1982, is pictured giving a tour of the prison to US President Barack Obama and his family in 2013.

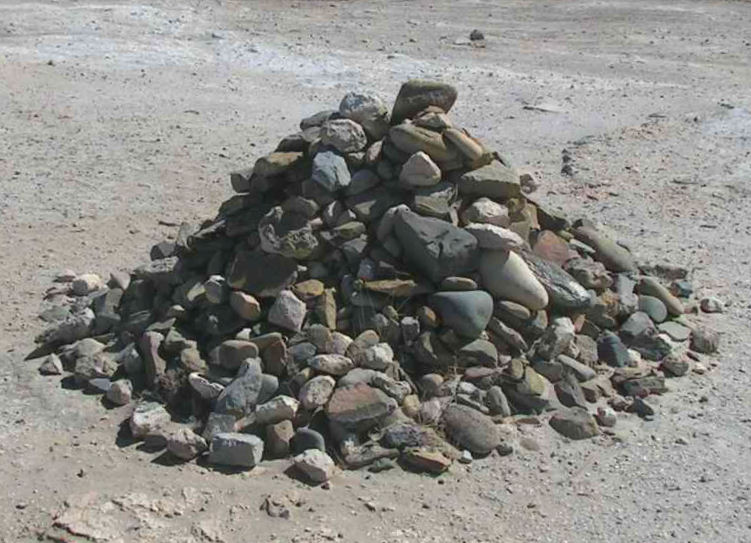
Rock pile started by Nelson Mandela and added to—one rock at a time—by former prisoners returning to the island.

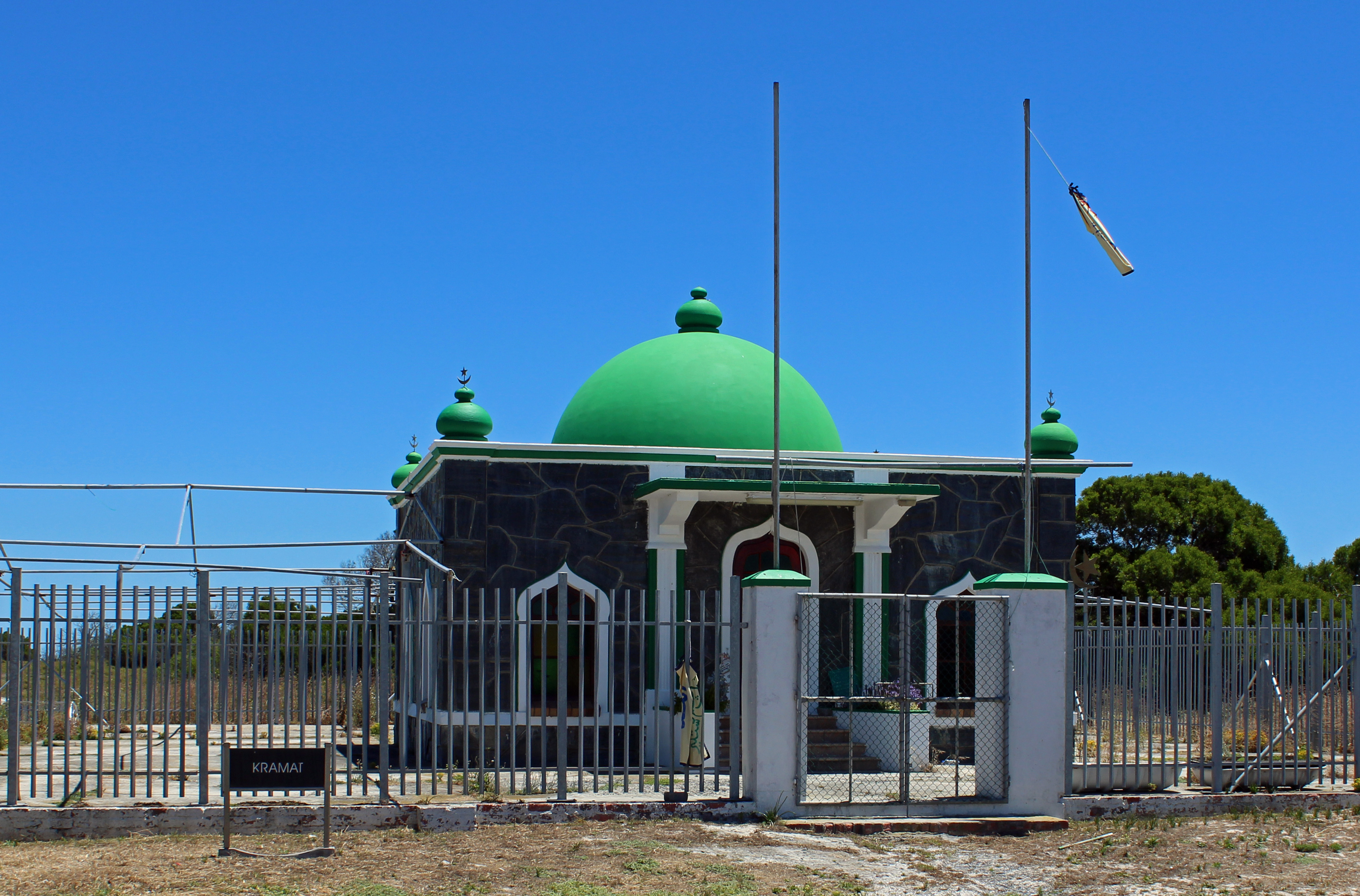
Muslim Moturu Kramat shrine on Robben Island.

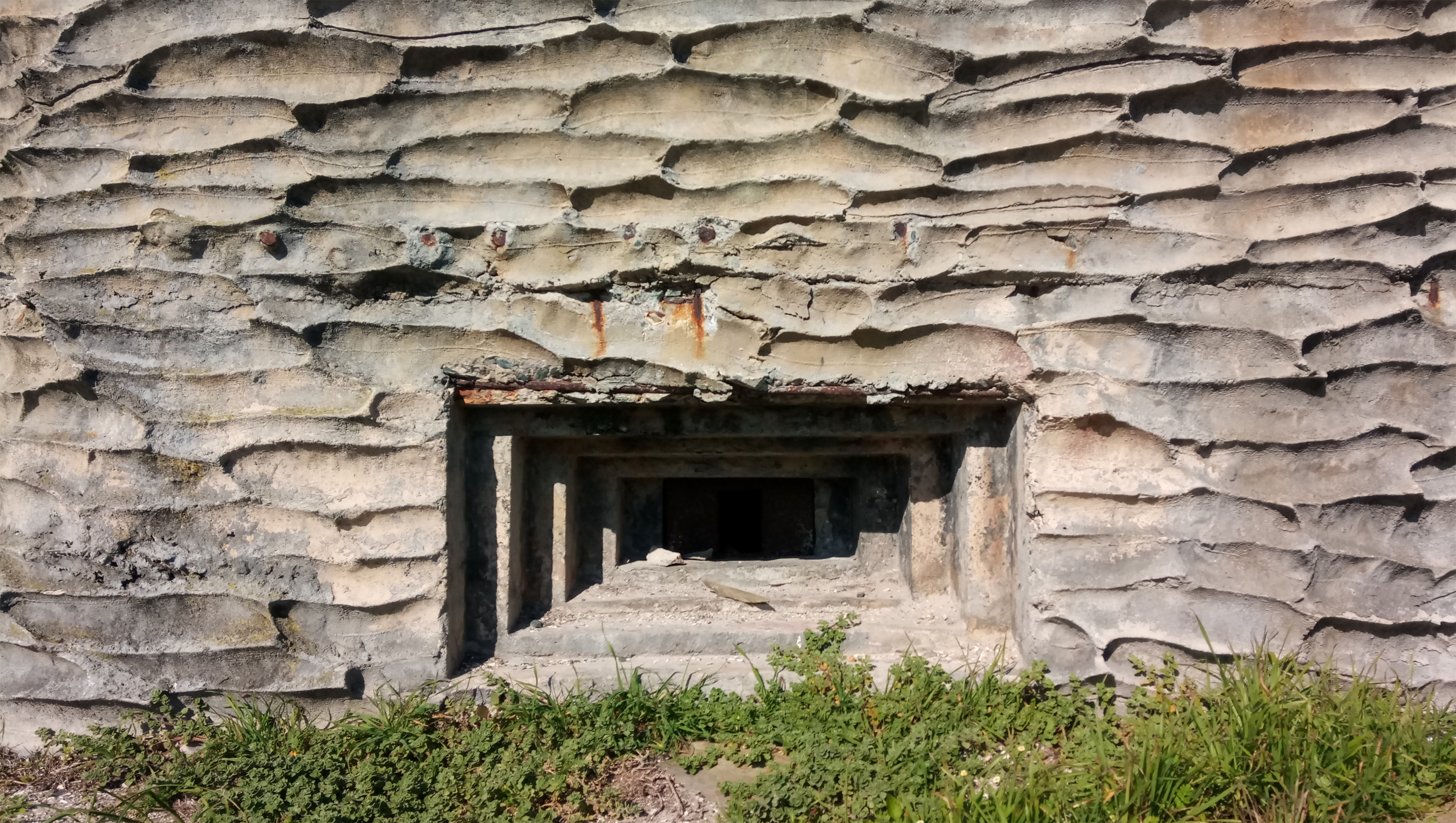
World War II guard pillbox.

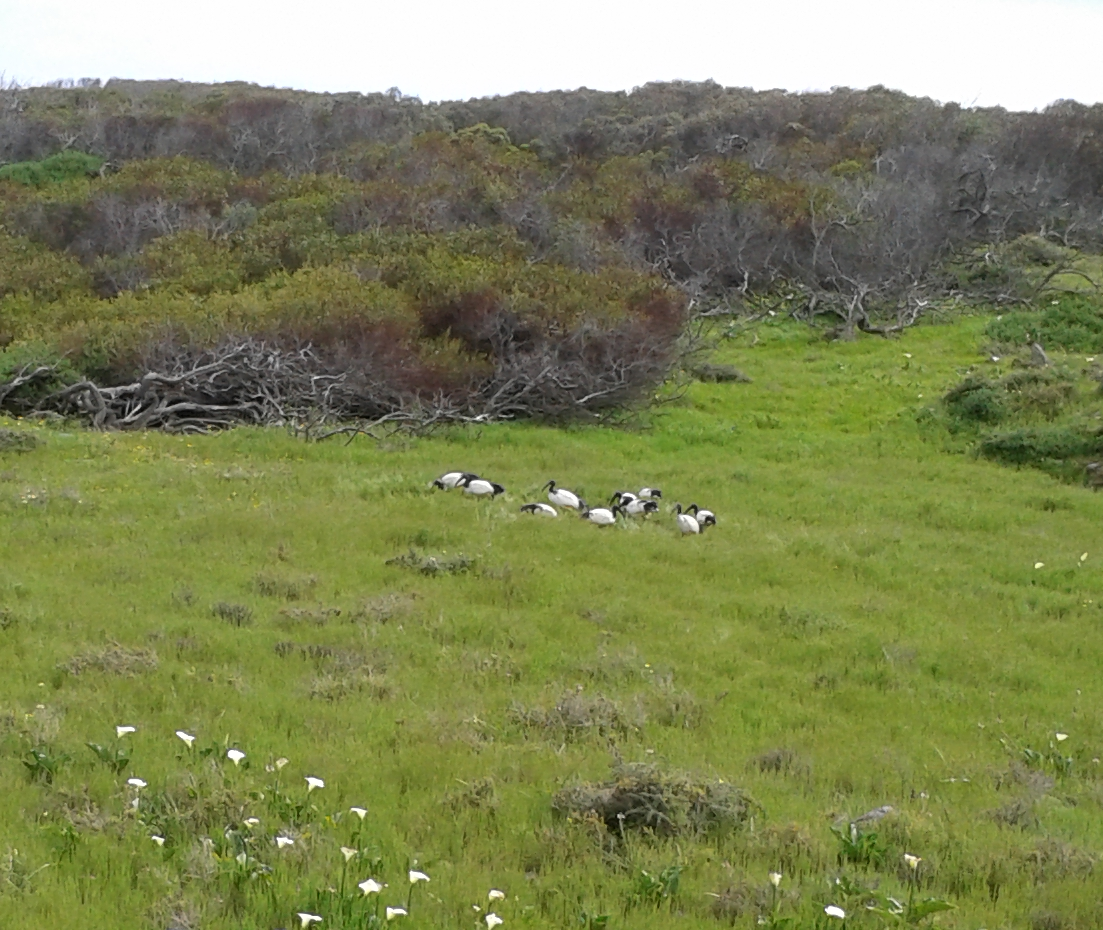
African sacred ibis on Robben Island, 2015.

== See also ==
- 1620 Robben Island earthquake
- List of World Heritage Sites in South Africa
- List of heritage sites near Cape Town
