= Hermann Schutte =

Bremen builder (1761–1844)

Hermann Schutte (1761–1844) was a Bremen-born contractor who came to South Africa as an employee of the Dutch East India Company. He was involved with the design of the Green Point Lighthouse, the first lighthouse erected on Africa's southern coast. Together with Anton Anreith and Louis Michael Thibault, Schutte contributed towards the revitalization of Cape Town's architectural idioms.
