= Bakoven =

- Suburb of Cape Town
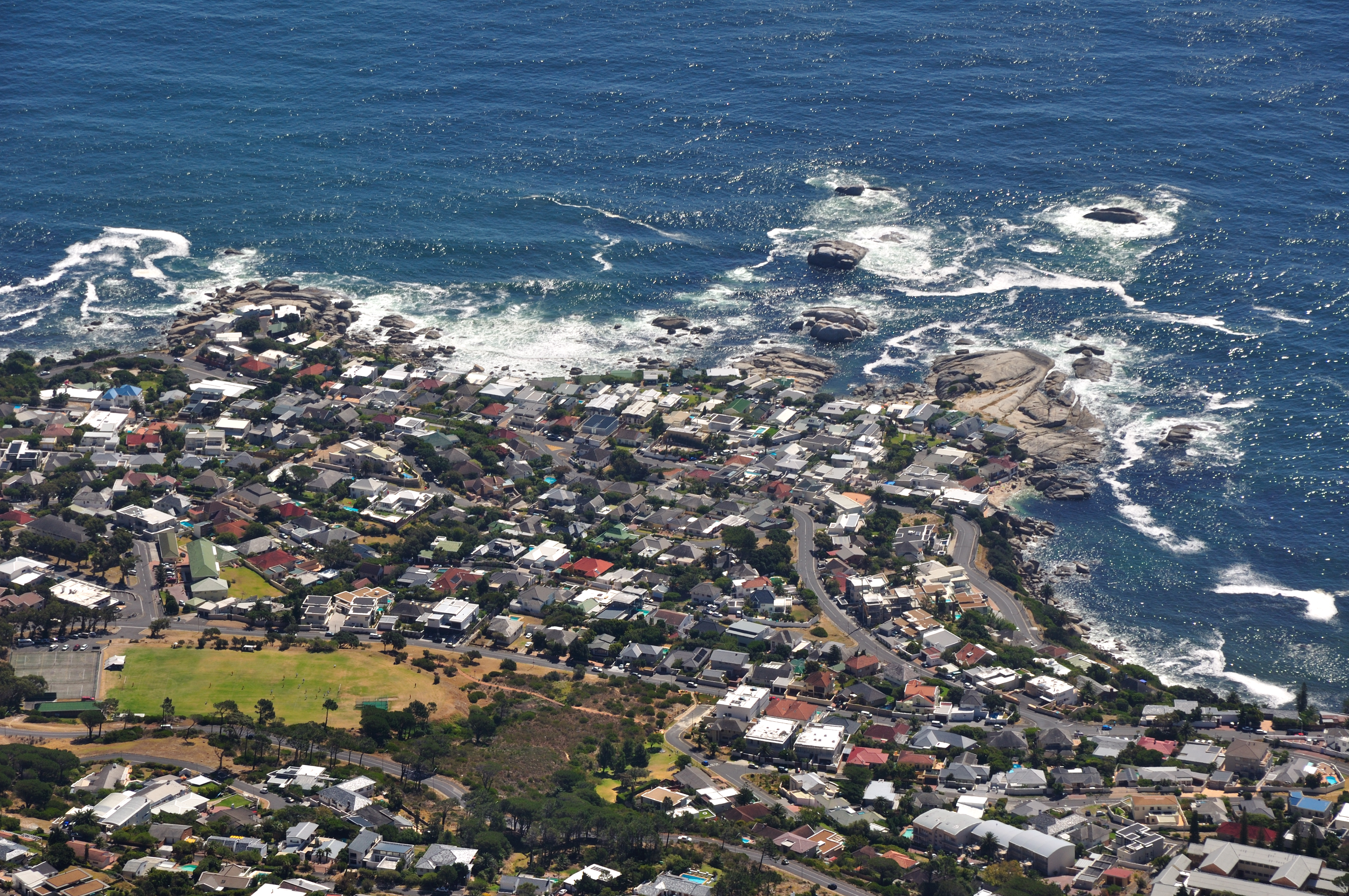

- Location within Western Cape Location within South Africa
- Coordinates: 33.963°S 18.382°E
- Country: South Africa
- Province: Western Cape
- Municipality: City of Cape Town

Area
  - Total: 1.35 km^{2} (0.52 sq mi)

Population (2011)
  - Total: 2,209
  - Density: 1,640/km^{2} (4,240/sq mi)

Racial makeup (2011)
  - Black African: 10.6%
  - Coloured: 3.4%
  - Indian/Asian: 2.2%
  - White: 82.6%
  - Other: 1.1%

First languages (2011)
  - English: 72.6%
  - Afrikaans: 14.2%
  - Xhosa: 1.7%
  - Other: 11.5%
- Time zone: UTC+2 (SAST)
- Postal code (street): 8005
- Area code: 021

Bakoven is a small residential suburb in the Atlantic Seaboard region of Cape Town, South Africa.

It is positioned between Victoria Road and the sea. South of Bakoven and Camps Bay the coastline is protected, with thousands of acres of mountain Nature Reserve. This scenic drive from Bakoven and Camps Bay to Llandudno and Hout Bay is one of the most visited in the Cape.

It has a quiet beach atmosphere, good conditions for snorkeling, boating and fishing, as well as the Nature Reserve in the South, with trendy Camps Bay to the north and east.

Named "Baking oven", possibly after an off shore rock of that shape; the name is Dutch in origin.

Bakoven has two popular beaches, Beta Beach and Oudekraal - which were an old settlement of Khoi San people there, the original people in the Cape.

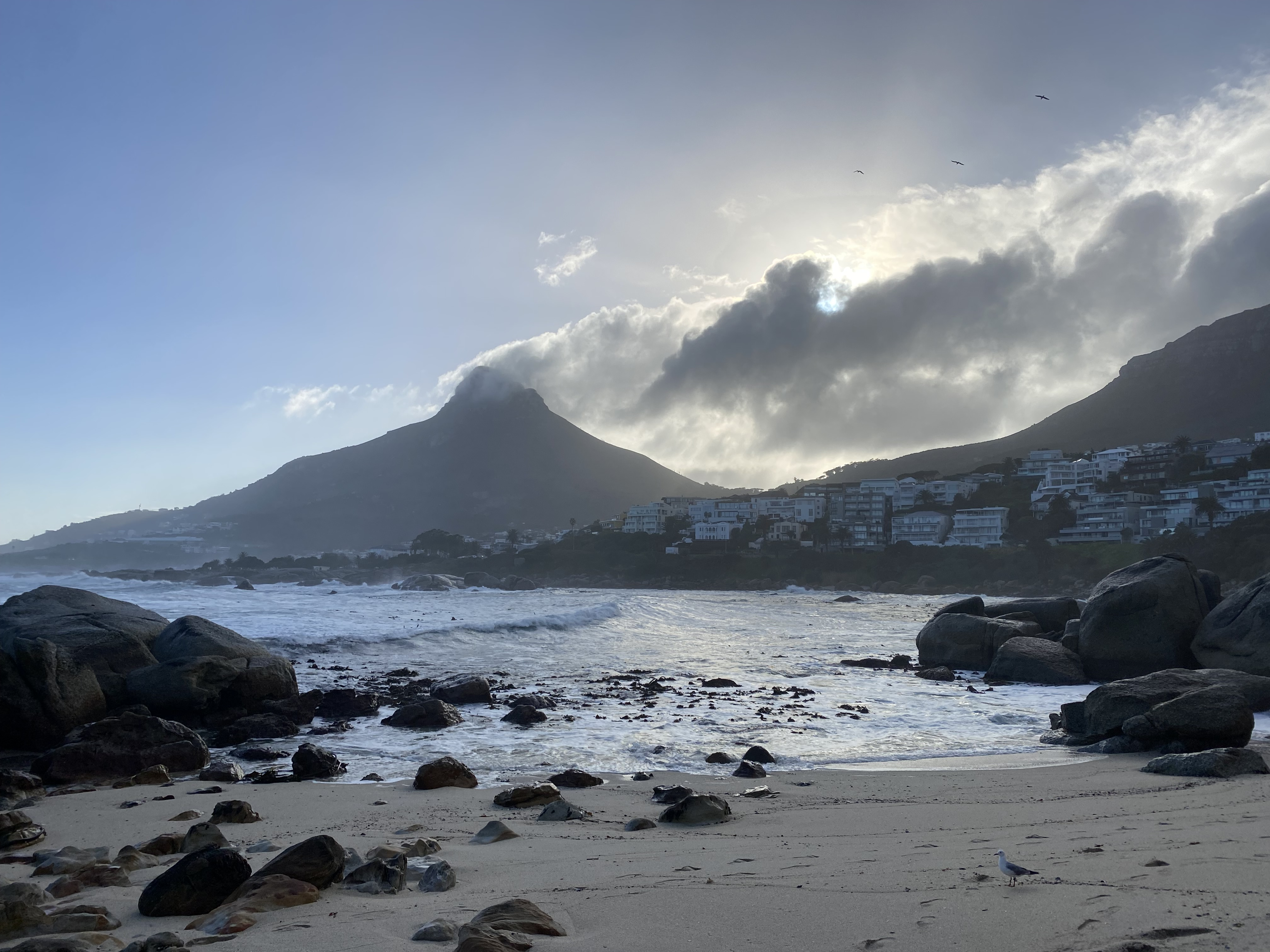
View of the Atlantic Ocean from Beta Beach in Bakoven, Cape Town in June 2023
