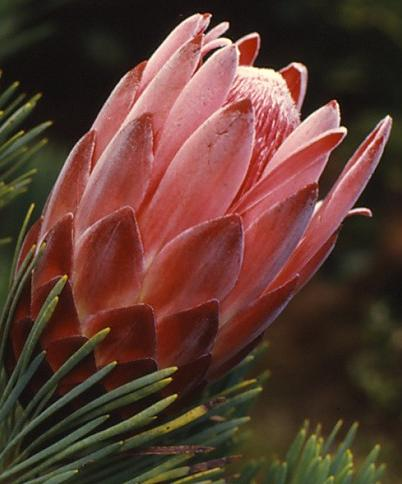
- Protea aristata in cultivation, Kirstenbosch National Botanical Garden, Cape Town.

Conservation status
- Vulnerable (IUCN 3.1)

Scientific classification
- Kingdom: Plantae
- Clade: Embryophytes
- Clade: Tracheophytes
- Clade: Angiosperms
- Clade: Eudicots
- Order: Proteales
- Family: Proteaceae
- Genus: Protea
- Species: P. aristata

Binomial name
- Protea aristata E.Phillips

= Protea aristata =

Species of flowering plant

Protea aristata is a compact shrub with beautiful flowers which is endemic to the southwestern part of the Cape Region of South Africa. P. aristata has become one of South Africa's most famous proteas in spite of its relatively late discovery, and re-discovery in 1953. The leaves are soft, dense and needle-like and the flower heads are a stunning crimson red, it may thus be a good potential ornamental plant for South African gardens. It is usually called the Ladismith sugarbush in South African English, although it has been called pine sugar bush in Australia. In the Afrikaans language it has the vernacular name of klein-den-suikerbos.

== Taxonomy ==
A specimen of Protea aristata was first collected by the South African botanists Thomas Pearson Stokoe and Richard Primos as a budding branch in the 'Seven Weeks Poort Mountains', near the town of Ladismith in the Western Cape province of South Africa. Based on the holotype specimen collected by these two, the South African Protea taxonomist Edwin Percy Phillips described the plant as a new species in 1938. In spite of being locally common in the Seweweekspoort (a mountain pass) the plant species could not be found again until 1953, prior to which it was considered to be extinct.

When exactly the species was first collected is in dispute, the label on the herbarium voucher sheet (Primos#85) housed in the Kew Herbarium, written by Primos, states December 1937, but in the species description written by Phillips in the Journal of South African Botany the date December 1928 is given. The Kew specimen is labelled as being a 'type', perhaps it is the holotype, but it may also be an isotype, because the National Herbarium in Pretoria also has a sheet with the collection number Primos#85, this sheet having more exsiccata material attached to it. This sheet is labelled, also by Primos, as being collected at the exact same locality, but in December 1928, and confusingly, it is stored as the holotype of the species P. laetans, which was first collected from along the Blyde River in Mpumalanga.

The Latin word aristata means 'awned' and refers to the prominent awns on the lip found atop the perianth.

== Description ==
=== Habitus ===
This species is an upright, stocky, perennial, evergreen shrub from 1 metre (3.3 ft) up to 2.5 metres (8.2 ft) in height, up to 3 metres (9.8 ft) in diameter in very old specimens, with a single main stem up to 25 centimetres (9.8 in) in diameter. For the plants in cultivation in Australia, common sizes of the adult shrubs are given as between 1.2 metres (3.9 ft) and 3.6 metres (12 ft), but most garden shrubs usually attain the height of 2.5 metres (8.2 ft), and a spread of 0.8–1 metre (2.6–3.3 ft). It is somewhat like a small pine tree in appearance. The bark of the trunk is smooth and grey-coloured, but the younger stems have light brown bark. In the wild, the shrubs were originally found growing trailing upon the ground. The flower-bearing stems are upright, hairless, 5–7 mm in diameter, and carry the flower at the apex. The plants are very slow to mature, and may live to 50 years. The leaves and stems of this species exude an unpleasant, sulphuric smell when cut or bruised.

=== Leaves ===
The leaves are thin and needle-like, linear, flattened, smooth in texture and arranged pointing upwards on the stem. They are 7–11 centimetres (2.8–4.3 in) in length, 2–3 mm in width, and terminate in a soft black acuminate point. They are glabrous and glaucous-green in colour. The petiolar region only tapers slightly into the leaf blade.

=== Flowers ===
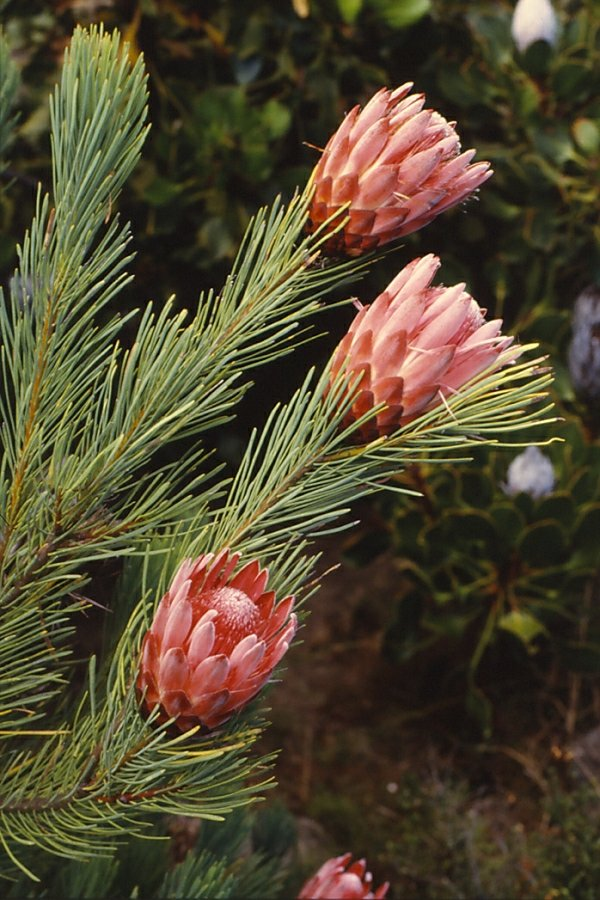
Protea aristata apical inflorescences

The flower heads are large for a Protea species, and shaped like an inverted cone (obconic), to bell-shaped when fully opened. It is 11–14 centimetres (4.3–5.5 in) in length and 10–12 centimetres (3.9–4.7 in) wide. The involucral bracts are arranged in 7 to 9 series, with the outer series very broad and egg-shaped to almost rounded, nude, 10–15 mm long, 10 mm wide. Inner series long and quite broad, acuminate, 40–80 mm (1.6–3.1 in) in length, 20–25 mm (0.79–0.98 in) in width, densely hairy; innermost series spatulate, 100–120 mm (3.9–4.7 in) in length, 10–15 mm in width, terminally hooked. The bracts vary in colour from dark to almost black at the base in the outer series, to a deep carmine or crimson in the inner series; the dense hairs give a silvery appearance to the bracts, which are tipped with short white hairs along the margins at the apex. The colour has also been described as reddish pink, and that of the outer bracts dark red, with the inner being pink. It is monoecious, both sexes occur in each flower. The perianth of the flower is coloured pink.

The fruit grow quickly.

== Distribution ==
Protea aristata is restricted in the wild to the northern and southern slopes in a 60 km stretch of the far western end of the Klein Swartberg mountains in the Western Cape province of South Africa. The total extent of occurrence is 423 km^{2}, the area of occupancy within that where the plants actually grow is only 152 km^{2}. This region stretches from the Buffelspoort to the Seweweekspoort. It is known from less than ten different populations found within this range. It can be seen in the wild in the mountains above the town of Ladismith, where it has been recorded growing along certain roadsides, and near the town of Calitzdorp. The plant seldom clusters into dense communities, rather it is found as single plants widely distributed throughout the landscape.

== Ecology ==
=== Habitat ===
Protea aristata seems to prefer rocky krantzes, ledges on high-altitude cliffs and open, rocky sandstone slopes, the habit of which has, according to the South African botanist John Patrick Rourke, led to the survival of very old specimens possibly of up to fifty years old, protected from fire by their rocky surroundings. The habitat is otherwise montane fynbos. In all of the known locations where it is found in the wild it grows in a substrate derived from sandstone. It is found growing between the altitudes of 600 to 1,500 metres (2,000 to 4,900 ft), or up to 1,585 metres (5,200 ft), although an early, when it was much less known, 1959 botanical magazine profile on the species stated 750 to 2,000 metres (2,460 to 6,560 ft). Wildfires should ideally pass through the territory every fifteen years.

=== Reproduction ===
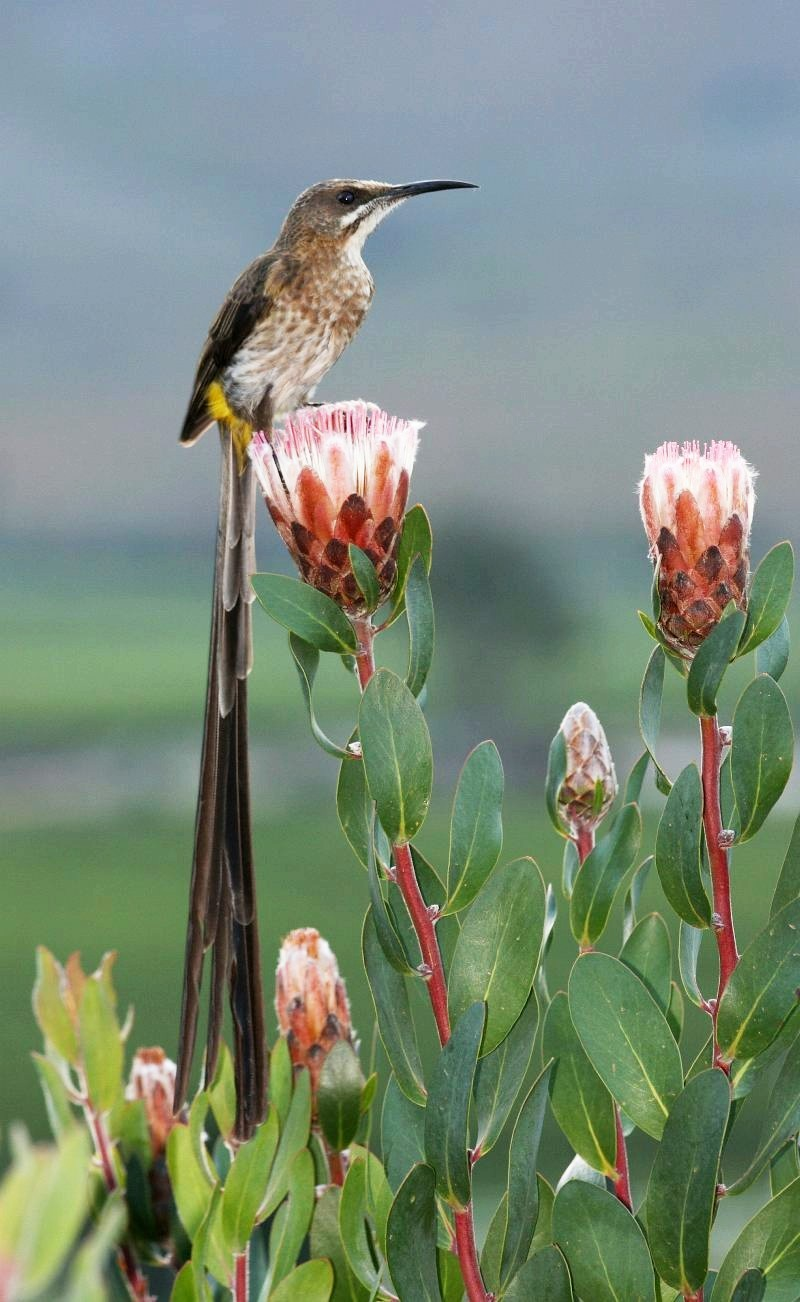
Cape Sugarbird (Promerops cafer), the probable main pollinator, on a different species of Protea in Slanghoek Mountain Resort, Western Cape

Flowering occurs in the hot and dry summer, from October to December, with the peak in December, and occasionally as late as February. Sometimes the flowering can commense as early as spring. It is pollinated by birds, possibly especially the Cape sugarbird. The seed is fully ripe by May in the wild. When released from their capsules, the seeds are eventually dispersed by means of the wind.

=== Wildfires ===
The adult specimens of this protea are killed when they are caught in the wildfires which periodically pass through the native habitat, but the seeds can survive such events. Protea species which have adapted to frequent fire regimes in their habitat in such a manner are called 'reseeders', or, more technically, serotinous. The fruit are stored in the old, dried inflorescences, which are persistently retained on the plant after senescence, although they eventually fall off. According to Rourke, drought-stricken plants in their natural habitat shed their seeds much faster than those growing in cultivation. In the wild this normally occurs after six to nine months, but in cultivation they may remain closed on the plant for a year or more. According to one source the seeds are not kept protected within the seed head, but are released immediately after ripening. Other sources dispute this, stating that the inflorescence only opens to allow the seeds to escape after it has completely desiccated. Fires in late summer may stimulate the inflorescences to open.

== Uses ==
The sole limiting feature of the plant as an ornamental cut flower is the unpleasant odour emitted by the cut stems. Nonetheless, it said to work well as a cut flower, and is grown on commercial flower farms in Hawaii and California. The cultivar Protea × 'Venus' is a scentless hybrid of P. aristata with P. repens and is grown in the cut flower industry.

Soon after its re-discovery, it was featured in the South African botanical magazine Flowering Plants of Africa in 1959, illustrated with a painting by the botanical artist Fay Anderson. It was featured on the South African 10 cent postage stamp in 1977.

=== Horticulture ===
Protea aristata only became known to the general South African public as an ornamental plant in the 1960s. The plants grow slowly and are long-lived compared to other species of garden Protea, and make a neat, compact shrub, whereas most other species become scraggly with age. Pruning off the old flower heads after flowering helps maintain the compact shape. In cultivation it will grow in clay, loam or sandy soils, with a pH range from acidic to alkaline, but it performs best in well-drained, acidic, sandstone-derived soils, and will also grow well in a well-draining granitic medium. It prefers a position in full sunlight. The species is fairly resistant to drought, especially once established, and frost down to −4 °C (25 °F). It will not grow well in areas with too much moisture or rainfall. The plant attracts birds and insects. It can be used in Mediterranean-style gardens, a fynbos garden or a larger rock garden, as a container specimen, a feature plant, or as part of a mixed bed. There are some magnificent specimens in the National Botanical Gardens at Kirstenbosch, Cape Town, although it is grown there with some difficulty because it is sometimes too wet at this location. It has also been recommended as a good garden plant on the plains and near the coast in South Australia.

It is best propagated using fresh seed. Seed is best sown in the late summer to autumn. Seeds and seedlings rot easily when afforded excessive amounts of water, thus the substrate must be well-aerated and well-drained. Seeds germinate best when they are only slightly covered with the substrate. As an adaption to the periodic wildfires in their habitat, seeds likely germinate more successfully after being treated with smoke, using a tent, or a liquid smoke extract. Seeds also appear to be stimulated to germinate by alternating cool nights with warm days, between 10 and 20 °C (50 and 68 °F). The seedlings are best grown out under light shade, such as in a shade-house in South Africa.

Like all species of Protea, in cultivation the plants are susceptible to a large variety of pests and diseases. In South Africa, possible pests include caterpillars, nematodes, scale insects, tipwilters and snout beetles. Root rot caused by Phytophthora cinnamomi is the most dangerous lethal disease of proteas, especially during the warmth of summer, but a variety of fungi pathogens can kill proteas.

== Conservation ==
In his 1980 book on the proteas of Southern Africa, Rourke stated that although Protea aristata was said to be generally considered scarce in the wild, it was in fact quite common within its distribution. By the 1990s, it was officially considered a rare plant. In 1996 the South African National Biodiversity Institute first assessed the conservation status of the species for the Red List of South African Plants as 'rare', this was upgraded to 'vulnerable' in 2009, an assessment that was repeated in 2019.

In 2009 the total population was estimated to have a maximum of 6,000 individuals, with no one subpopulation numbering more than 1,000 plants. Many of the less than ten localities where this species is known to occur are small and only consist of some isolated plants. The total population numbers are believed to be decreasing as of 2019. Nonetheless, the species is still said to be locally common in the Seweweekspoort mountain pass.

Too frequent fires are a problem for this plant, as they do not allow the plants enough time to mature, and the recruitment of new seedlings is diminished. This is thought to be the main reason for the decline of the species.
