= Kannaland Local Municipality =

Kannaland
- Local municipality
- Seal

- Location of Kannaland Local Municipality within the Western Cape
- Coordinates: 33°40′S 21°15′E
- Country: South Africa
- Province: Western Cape
- District: Garden Route
- Seat: Ladismith
- Wards: 4

Government
  - Type: Municipal council
  - Mayor: Jeffrey Donson (ICOSA)

Area
  - Total: 4,758 km^{2} (1,837 sq mi)

Population (2022)
  - Total: 31,986
  - Density: 6.723/km^{2} (17.41/sq mi)

Racial makeup (2022)
  - Black African: 1.4%
  - Coloured: 86.8%
  - Indian/Asian: 0.3%
  - White: 8.3%

First languages (2011)
  - Afrikaans: 95.4%
  - English: 2.5%
  - Other: 2.1%
- Time zone: UTC+2 (SAST)
- Municipal code: WC041

Kannaland Municipality (Afrikaans: Kannaland Munisipaliteit) is a local municipality located within the Garden Route District Municipality, in the Western Cape province of South Africa. The municipal area is situated in the western part of the Little Karoo and includes the towns of Ladismith, Calitzdorp and Zoar. As of 2022, it has a population of 31,986. Its municipality code is WC041.

== Geography ==
The municipality covers an area of 4,758 square kilometres (1,837 sq mi) in the Little Karoo, stretching from the Swartberg in the north to the Langeberg in the south, and from the Anysberg in the west to the Gamkaberg in the east. It is drained by the Groot River and the Gourits River. It abuts on the Laingsburg and Prince Albert municipalities to the north, the Oudtshoorn Municipality to the east, the Hessequa Municipality to the south and the Swellendam and Langeberg Municipalities to the west.

== Demographics ==
According to the 2022 census, the municipality had a population of 31,986 people, increasing at an annual rate of 2.5% from 2011. Of these, 86.8% identified as "Coloured," 8.3% as "White," and 3.2% as "Other."

The largest town and location of the municipal headquarters is Ladismith, which as of 2011 has a population of 7,127. Ladismith is at the foot of the Swartberg, as are Zoar (pop. 4,659) and Calitzdorp (pop. 4,284) to the east. Van Wyksdorp (pop. 833) is further south in the valley of the Groot River.

== History ==
=== Formation of the municipality ===
At the end of the apartheid era, the area that is today the Kannaland Municipality was divided between two Regional Services Councils (RSCs): the northern part around Ladismith, Zoar and Calitzdorp formed part of the Klein Karoo RSC, while the southern part around Van Wyksdorp formed part of the South Cape RSC. The towns of Ladismith, Calitzdorp and Van Wyksdorp were governed by municipal councils elected by their white residents. The coloured residents of Nissenville (Ladismith) and Calitzdorp were governed by management committees subordinate to the white councils. The mission settlement of Zoar was governed by a board of management.

While the negotiations to end apartheid were taking place a process was established for local authorities to agree on voluntary mergers. In November 1993, the Municipality of Calitzdorp and the Calitzdorp Management Committee merged into a single municipal council.

After the national elections of 1994 a process of local government transformation began, in which negotiations were held between the existing local authorities, political parties, and local community organisations. As a result of these negotiations, the existing local authorities were dissolved and transitional local councils (TLCs) were created for each town and village. In December 1994 Ladismith TLC replaced the Municipality of Ladismith and the Nissenville Management Committee. In January 1995 Calitzdorp TLC replaced the Municipality of Calitzdorp, and Zoar TLC replaced the Zoar Management Board. In October 1995 Vanwyksdorp Municipality was also converted into a TLC.

The transitional councils were initially made up of members nominated by the various parties to the negotiations, until May 1996 when elections were held. At these elections the Regional Services Councils were replaced by District Councils (DCs), and transitional representative councils (TRCs) were elected to represent rural areas outside the TLCs on the DCs. The area that is today Kannaland included the Ladismith and Calitzdorp TRCs under the Klein Karoo DC as well as part of the Langeberg TRC under the South Cape DC.

At the local elections of December 2000 the TLCs and TRCs were dissolved and the Kannaland Municipality was established as a single local authority. At the same election the Klein Karoo and South Cape District Councils were also dissolved and replaced by the Eden District Municipality.

=== Political history since 2000 ===
The December 2000 local government elections returned a council of four Democratic Alliance (DA) councillors, four African National Congress (ANC) councillors, and one Pan Africanist Congress (PAC) councillor. A short-lived coalition led by the DA took power after the December 2000 local government elections, but it collapsed when the single PAC councillor withdrew his support, and the ANC took control of the council in March 2001.

The March 2006 local government elections returned a council of four ANC councillors, two DA councillors, two Independent Civic Organisation of South Africa (ICOSA) councillors, and one Independent Democrats (ID) councillor. An ANC/DA coalition took power until this coalition collapsed in August 2006 and was replaced by a coalition between the DA and ICOSA. This coalition collapsed in September 2007 when two ICOSA and three ANC councillors crossed the floor to the new National People's Party (NPP), giving that party a majority of five seats in a council which at that time consisted of nine members. The DA refused to recognize the new NPP-led council administration as it alleged that the 2 ICOSA defectors were sacked prior to the floor-crossing window being open, and it challenged the council recomposition in the Western Cape High Court. The former mayor refused to step down pending the outcome of the case.

In 2011 the auditor-general declared that he could not give a clear statement about the financial situation in the municipality because the records are missing and no one seemed to know where they were. After almost a decade of financial problems an attempt to restore order was underway in 2011.

In the election of 18 May 2011 the council was reduced in size to seven seats. No party obtained a majority; ICOSA won three seats while the ANC and the DA won two each. ICOSA and the ANC formed a coalition to govern the municipality.

The election of 3 August 2016 left the party composition of the council unchanged. The DA and ANC councillors formed a coalition to govern without ICOSA, but DA national leadership said that the coalition had not been authorized. In March 2017 the ANC recalled its councillors to put an end to the coalition. However the mayor has not been recalled despite the national ANC structures stating that this would happen. A motion of no confidence in the mayor and speaker of the municipality was put forward in August 2017. The motion failed with the DA and ANC in the municipality against the motion, leaving the ANC mayor Magdalene Barry in power. The Democratic Alliance spokesperson on local government stated that the party would side with the ANC in order to keep the Independent Civic Organisation away from the public purse. This follows forensic evidence detailing financial misconduct that amounted to more than R14 million under Jeffrey Donson's tenure.

== Politics ==
The municipal council consists of ten members elected by mixed-member proportional representation. Five councillors are elected by first-past-the-post voting in five wards, while the remaining five are chosen from party lists so that the total number of party representatives is proportional to the number of votes received.

=== Election results ===
The following table shows the results of the 2026 election.

Party	Ward			List			Total seats
Party	Votes	%	Seats	Votes	%	Seats	Total seats
Independent Civic Organisation of South Africa	2,655	27.19	2	2,614	27.01	1	3
Democratic Alliance	2,271	23.26	2	2,544	26.28	1	3
Patriotic Alliance	1,492	15.28	1	1,516	15.66	1	2
Kannaland Independent Party	971	9.94	0	913	9.43	1	1
African National Congress	831	8.51	0	845	8.73	1	1
Independent candidates	334	3.42	0				0
9 other parties	1,211	12.40	0	1,247	12.88	0	0
Total	9,765	100.00	5	9,679	100.00	5	10
Valid votes	9,765	99.29		9,679	99.49		
Invalid/blank votes	70	0.71		50	0.51		
Total votes	9,835	100.00		9,729	100.00		
Registered voters/turnout	16,376	60.06		16,376	59.41		
