= Little Karoo =

Region in the Western Cape, South Africa

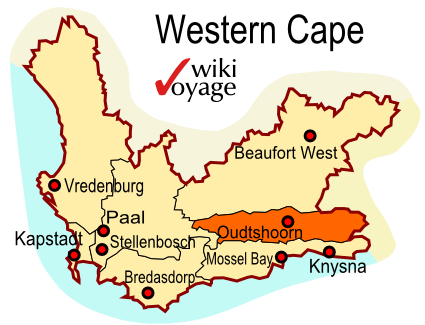

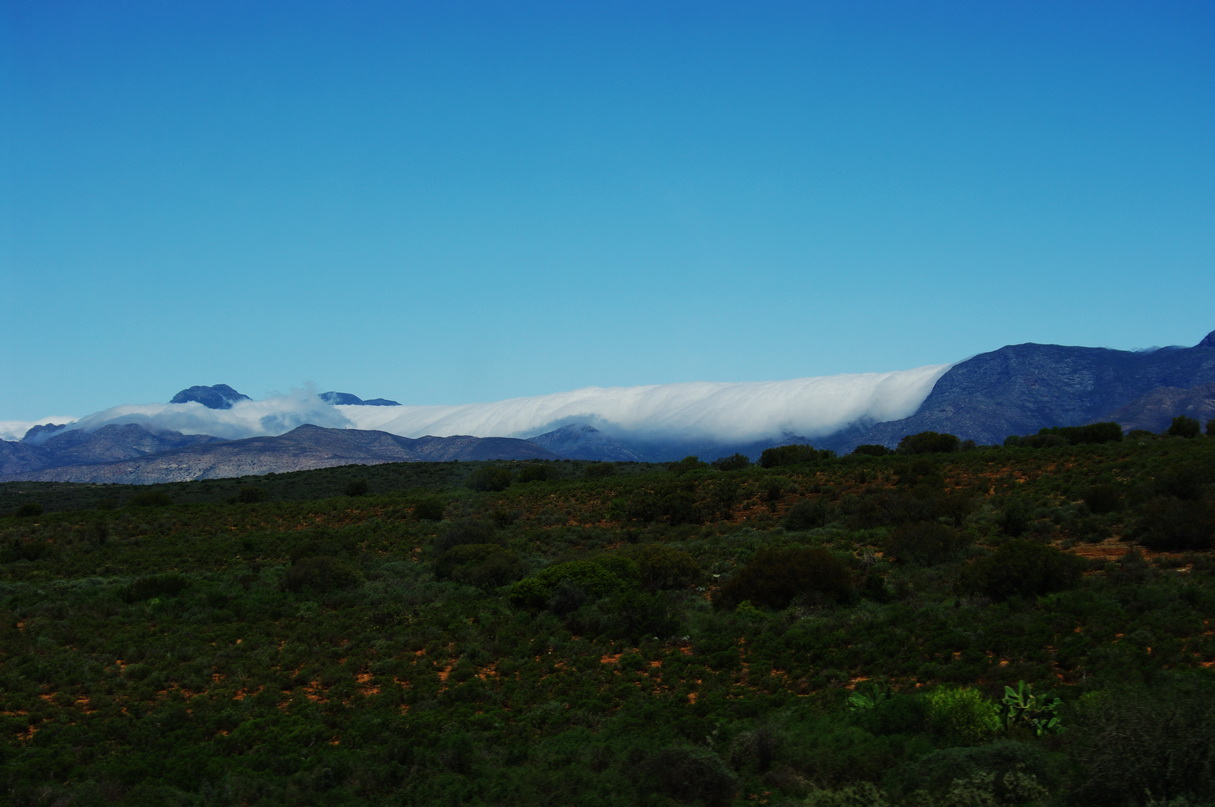

The Little Karoo, also known as the Klein Karoo, is a region in the south of the Western Cape province where ostrich farming was formerly practiced on a large scale. The area extends more or less from the Langeberg to the Swartberg. The Langeberg and the Outeniqua Mountains form the southern border of the area, the Swartberg the northern border. The main town is Oudtshoorn. Other towns/settlements in the area include: Ladismith, Calitzdorp, De Rust, as well as well-known mission stations such as Zoar, Amaliënstein, Barrydale and Dysselsdorp. Uniondale is the easternmost point of the area.

The area is mainly drained by the Gourits River, via its tributary the Olifants River. There are five island mountains in the region:Anysberg, Warmwaterberg, Touwsberg, Rooiberg, Gamkaberg, Kammanassieberg and Antoniesberg.
