= Erica lignosa =

Scientific classification
- Kingdom: Plantae
- Clade: Tracheophytes
- Clade: Angiosperms
- Clade: Eudicots
- Clade: Asterids
- Order: Ericales
- Family: Ericaceae
- Genus: Erica
- Species: E. lignosa

Binomial name
- Erica lignosa H.A.Baker

Species of flowering plant

Erica lignosa is a plant belonging to the genus Erica and is part of the fynbos. The species is endemic to the Western Cape and occurs in the Great Swartberg. The plant has a range of 50 km^{2} and grows between rocks and mountain peaks at high altitudes. Its habitat is not threatened.
