= Zoar, South Africa =

Zoar
- Location within Western Cape Location within South Africa
- Coordinates: 33°29′S 21°26′E
- Country: South Africa
- Province: Western Cape
- District: Garden Route
- Municipality: Kannaland

Area
  - Total: 49.10 km^{2} (18.96 sq mi)

Population (2011)
  - Total: 4,659
  - Density: 94.89/km^{2} (245.8/sq mi)

Racial makeup (2011)
  - Black African: 4.0%
  - Coloured: 95.0%
  - Indian/Asian: 0.4%
  - White: 0.2%
  - Other: 0.4%

First languages (2011)
  - Afrikaans: 96.9%
  - English: 1.5%
  - Other: 1.6%
- Time zone: UTC+2 (SAST)
- PO box: 6656
- Area code: 028

Zoar is a settlement in Garden Route District Municipality in the Western Cape province of South Africa.

The village and mission station is 21 km east of Ladismith. It was founded by a group of over 200 German Separatists seeking escape from religious persecution in their homeland, on the farm Elandsfontein in 1817 and named after Zoar on the Red Sea, mentioned in the Bible (Gen. 14:2-8). The name at first meant ‘insignificance’, but when Lot fled thither from Sodom, it acquired the meaning of ‘haven’. The Seweweekspoort pass and Seweweekspoort Peak are located to the north of the community.
