= Zelotes gooldi =

St Helena Dark Ground Spider

Conservation status
- Least Concern (SANBI Red List)

Scientific classification
- Kingdom: Animalia
- Phylum: Arthropoda
- Subphylum: Chelicerata
- Class: Arachnida
- Order: Araneae
- Infraorder: Araneomorphae
- Family: Gnaphosidae
- Genus: Zelotes
- Species: Z. gooldi

Binomial name
- Zelotes gooldi (Purcell, 1907)

Synonyms
- Melanophora gooldi Purcell, 1907; Zelotes cronwrighti (Tucker, 1923)

Species of spider

Zelotes gooldi is a species of spider in the family Gnaphosidae. It is endemic to southern Africa and is commonly known as the St Helena dark ground spider.

== Distribution ==
Zelotes gooldi is found in three countries: Botswana, Namibia, and South Africa. In South Africa, it has a wide distribution across four provinces: Eastern Cape, Free State, Northern Cape, and Western Cape. The species occurs at altitudes ranging from 109 to 1,576 m above sea level.

Notable collection localities include Burgersdorp, Cradock, Bloemfontein, Douglas, De Aar, Hanover, Caledon, Gamkaberg Nature Reserve, St. Helena Bay, Worcester, and multiple sites within the Cederberg Wilderness Area.

== Habitat and ecology ==
Zelotes gooldi are free-running spiders that inhabit the Fynbos, Grassland, and Nama Karoo biomes.

== Conservation ==
Zelotes gooldi is listed as Least Concern by the South African National Biodiversity Institute due to its wide geographic range across southern Africa. The species faces no significant threats and is protected in the Gamkaberg Nature Reserve and Cederberg Wilderness Area.

== Taxonomy ==
The species was originally described by William Frederick Purcell in 1907 from St. Helena in the Western Cape as Melanophora gooldi. FitzPatrick's 2007 revision synonymized Zelotes cronwrighti Tucker, 1923 with Z. gooldi. The species is known from both sexes.
