= Seweweekspoort =

Mountain pass in Western Cape, South Africa

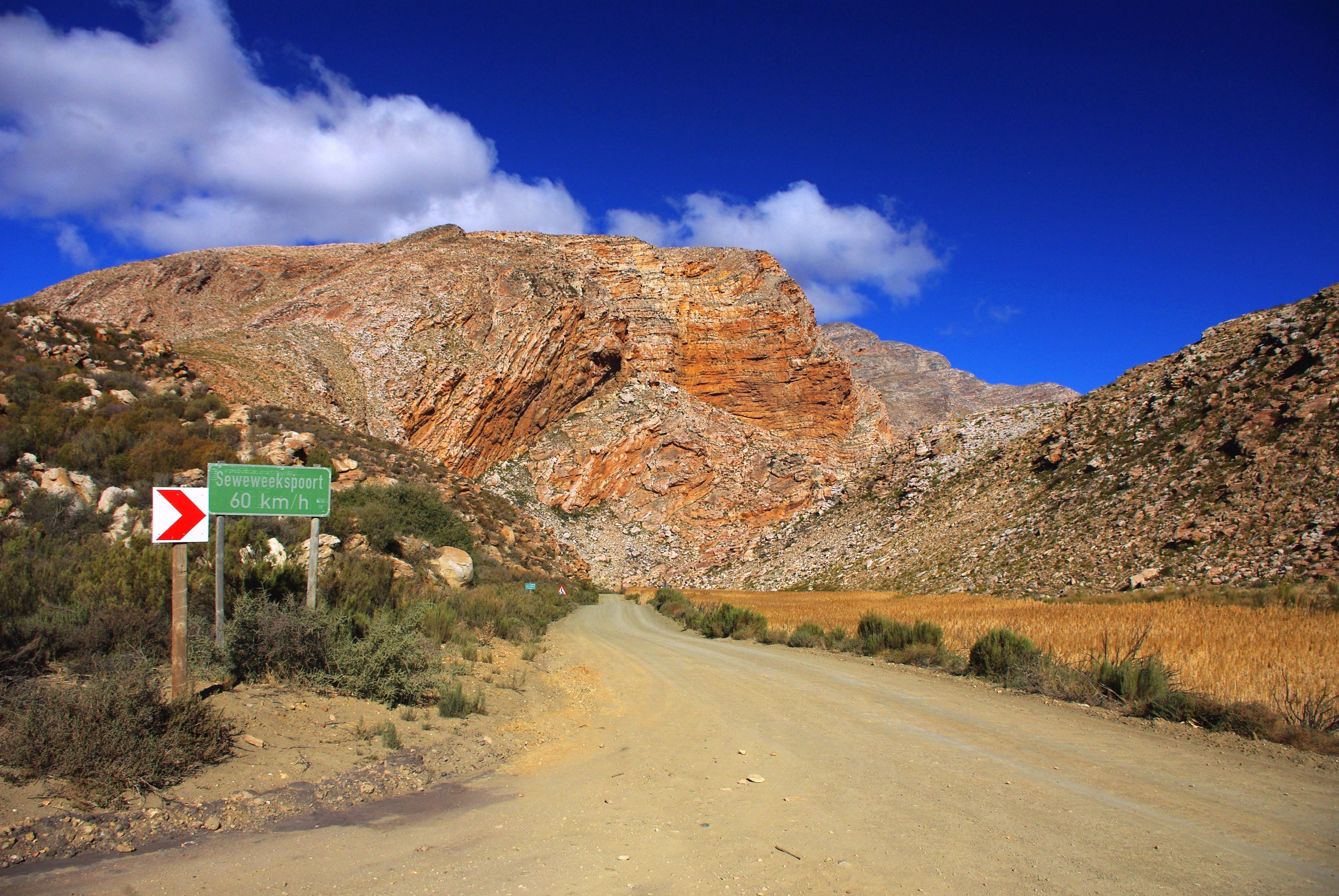
- A view of the northern entrance of the Seweweekspoort mountain pass.

- Location within Western Cape
- Traversed by: R323

Third Approach
- Location: Garden Route District Municipality, Western Cape, South Africa.
- Range: Cape Fold Mountains
- Coordinates: 33°24′S 21°24′E

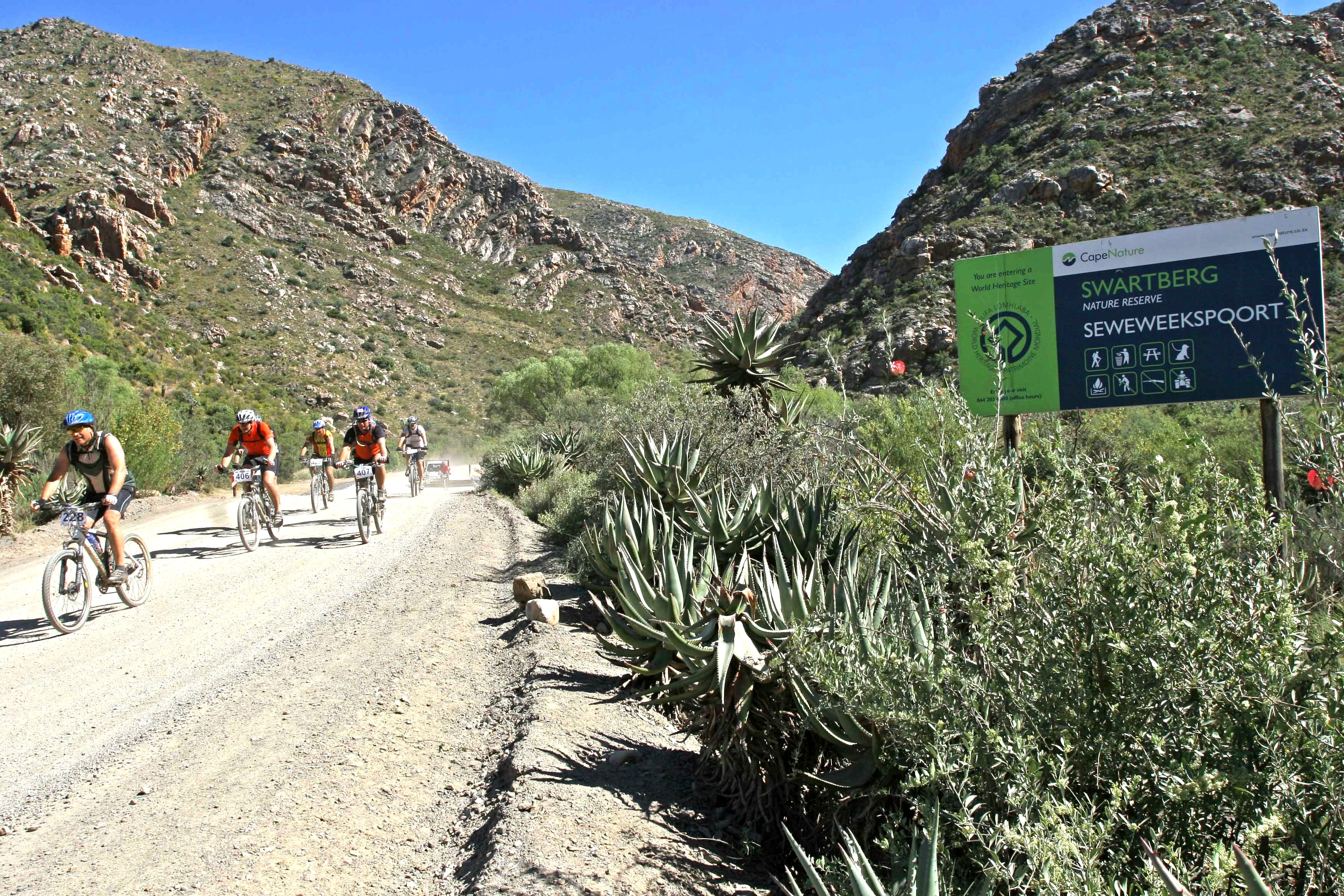
A photograph of the Seweweekspoort Mountain Bike Challenge on the Seweweekspoort pass.

Seweweekspoort is a mountain pass located along the R323 regional route running from Zoar and Laingsburg in the western Little Karoo region of South Africa's Western Cape province. The highest point in the Western Cape, Seweweekspoort Peak, is located close to the pass. The pass and surrounding area is a popular tourist attraction due to the diversity of local flora and the geology of the surrounding mountains.

== Name ==
Various theories exist about the origin of the name for the pass. The most plausible is that it is named after Rev. Louis Zerwick of the Berlin Missionary Society and probably worked at Amaliënstein and Zoar . In the vernacular the pronunciation of Zerwickspoort became Seweweekspoort.

== History ==
In the 1850s construction began on the road alongside the Gamka River using prison labor. The road was completed in November 1862 and is still in use.
