= Bergsig =

Bergsig (Afrikaans: Mountain View) is the name of several neighbourhoods in Southern Africa.

== In South Africa ==
- Bersig, neighbourhood in Caledon, Western Cape
- Bersig, neighbourhood in Calitzdorp
- Bersig, neighbourhood in Laingsburg, Western Cape
- Bersig, neighbourhood in Montagu, Western Cape
- Bersig, neighbourhood in Moorreesburg
- Bersig, neighbourhood in Queenstown, Eastern Cape
- Bersig, neighbourhood in Worcester, Western Cape

== In Namibia ==
- Bergsig, a hamlet in Kunene Region near the mouth of the Koigab River
