= Van Wyksdorp =

- Location within Western Cape Location within South Africa
- Coordinates: 33°44′57″S 21°27′40″E
- Country: South Africa
- Province: Western Cape
- District: Garden Route
- Municipality: Kannaland

Area
  - Total: 21.25 km^{2} (8.20 sq mi)

Population (2011)
  - Total: 833
  - Density: 39.2/km^{2} (102/sq mi)

Racial makeup (2011)
  - Black African: 1.9%
  - Coloured: 84.9%
  - Indian/Asian: 0.2%
  - White: 13.0%

First languages (2011)
  - Afrikaans: 90.0%
  - English: 4.9%
  - Xhosa: 2.0%
  - Other: 3.0%
- Time zone: UTC+2 (SAST)
- PO box: 6690
- Area code: 028
- Website: vanwyksdorptourism.com

Van Wyksdorp is a small rural village in the Klein Karoo of the Western Cape in South Africa. The nearest towns are Ladismith 45km (33km gravel), Calitzdorp 55km (52km gravel mountain pass), and Riversdale 67km (45km gravel).

Van Wyksdorp has recently been host to the Jobs for Carbon project, where the indigenous Spekboom portulacaria afra has been replanted on 800ha to aid restoration of the degraded veld, within the Gouritz Cluster Biosphere Reserve.

== History ==
The town was founded in 1897, on the farm Buffelsfontein - a parish of the Dutch Reformed Church. At a church meeting held on 27 January 1904, the name Van Wyksdorp was proposed and accepted due to the over 200 residents, with the surname Van Wyk, living in the town and on surrounding farms.

The village of Van Wyksdorp currently has a population of around 800 people. A few of them are still direct descendants of Van Wyk. Over the years, the people living in the village have mostly relied on farming – including fruit, sheep, cattle, and ostriches. They have benefited from a steady water supply throughout the year, provided by a mountain spring called "The Eye".

During the ostrich boom, Van Wyksdorp was once a centre of education in the Little Karoo. The school, built in 1912, had more than 200 learners at its peak, many of whom came from nearby towns. However, as railway connections to Ladismith and Riversdale improved, those towns grew while Van Wyksdorp slowly became smaller and quieter, reaching its current size.
