= Amaliënstein =

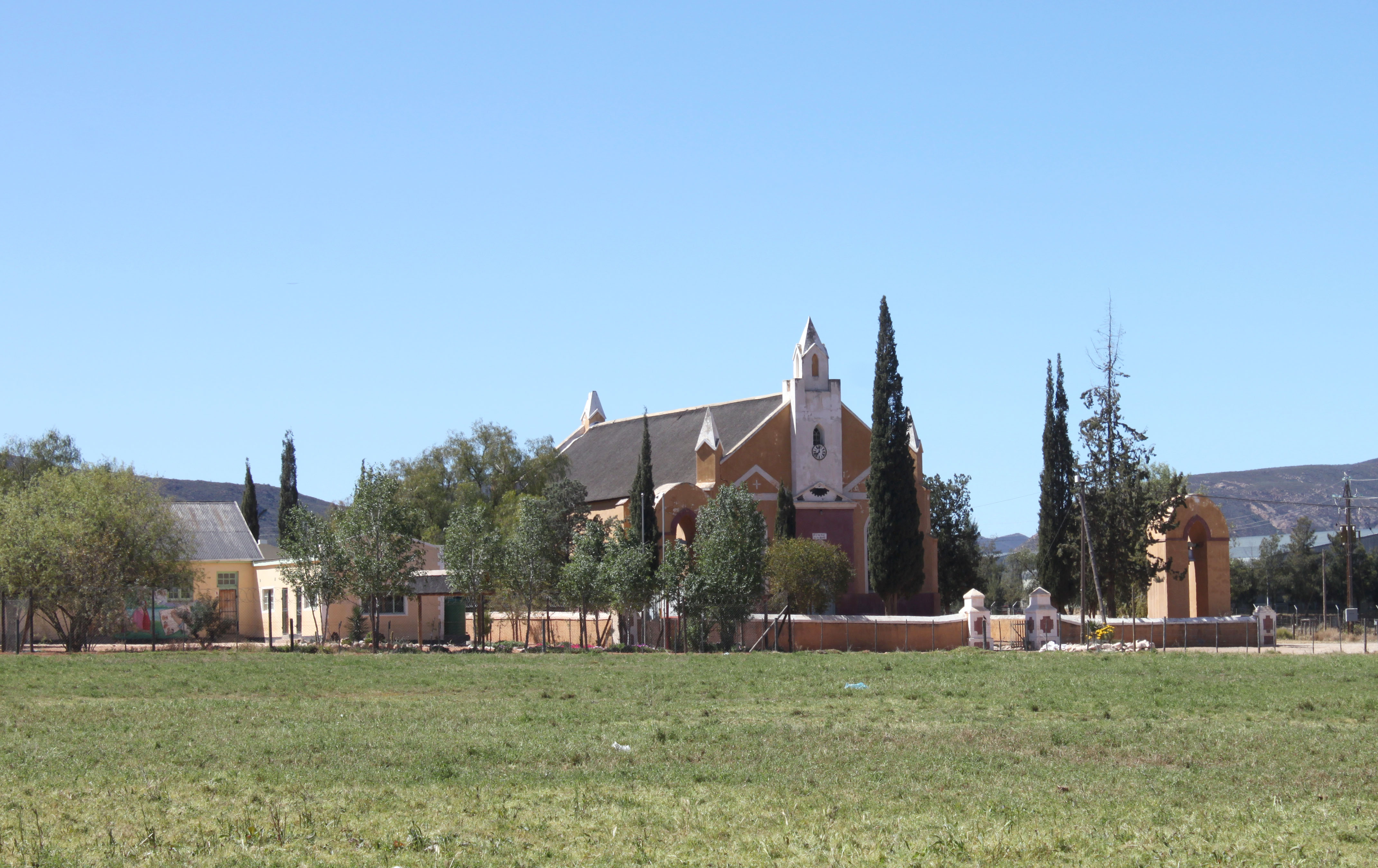
- The Amalienstein Mission Complex

- Location within Western Cape Location within South Africa
- Coordinates: 33.483°S 21.466°E
- Country: South Africa
- Province: Western Cape
- District: Garden Route
- Municipality: Kannaland
- Time zone: UTC+2 (SAST)

Amaliënstein is a former mission station of the Berlin Missionary Society, 22 km east of Ladismith, on the road to Calitzdorp. Named after Amalie von Stein, benefactress of German missions. The church complex was completed in 1853.
