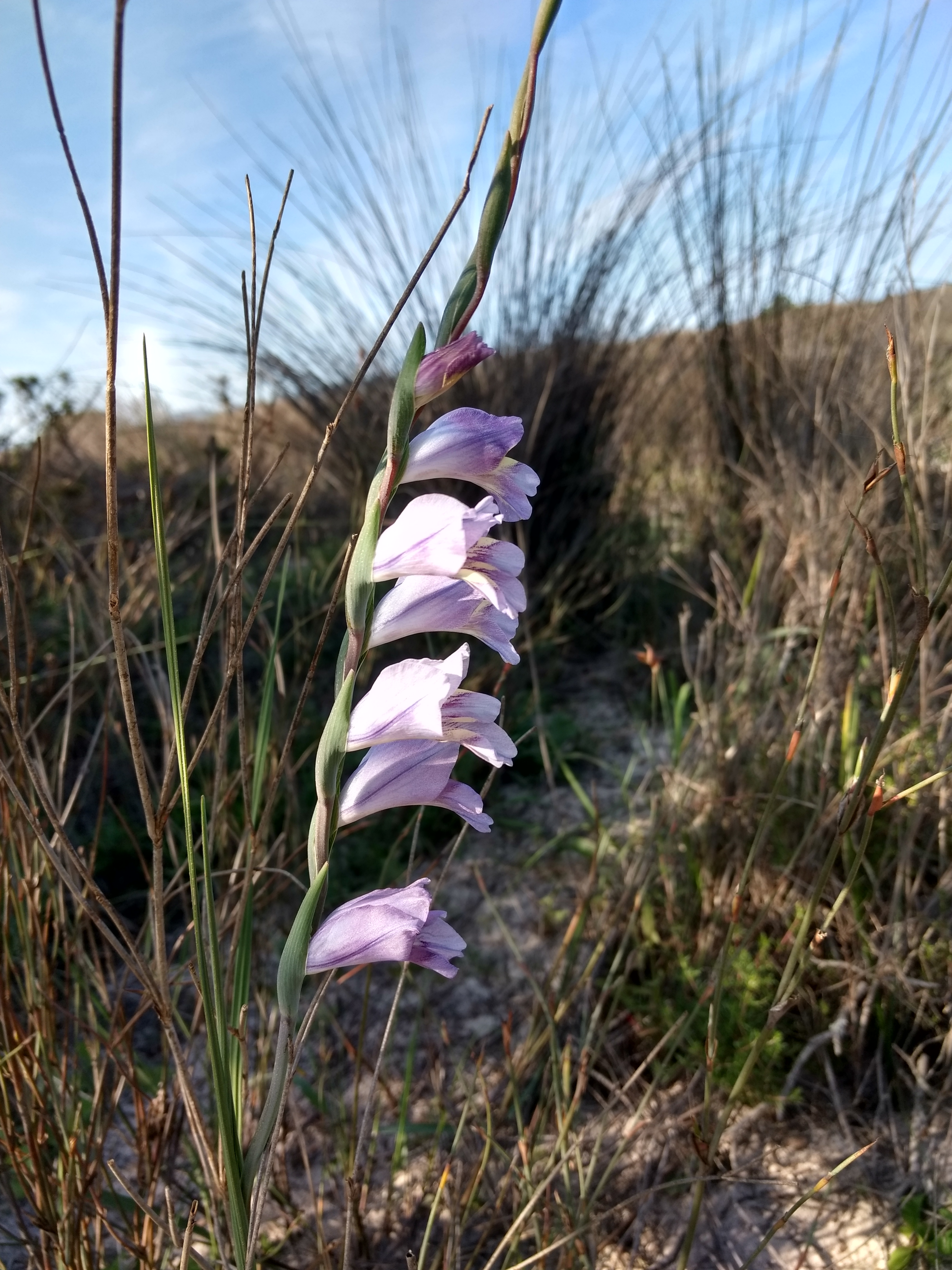

Scientific classification
- Kingdom: Plantae
- Clade: Tracheophytes
- Clade: Angiosperms
- Clade: Monocots
- Order: Asparagales
- Family: Iridaceae
- Genus: Gladiolus
- Species: G. patersoniae

Binomial name
- Gladiolus patersoniae Bolus f.

= Gladiolus patersoniae =

Species of plant

Gladiolus patersoniae is a herbaceous perennial plant belonging to the genus Gladiolus of the family Iridaceae, indigenous to the southern Cape regions of South Africa.

== Description ==
The flowers appear from late-winter to spring (populations at lower altitudes flower earlier). They are fragrant and can be a range of colours: blue, greyish, white or pink. The flower's corolla tube is short, and there is a band of yellow (often with darker outline) horizontally across the three bottom tepals.

The leaves are thin, cylindrical quills. It usually produces only three leaves. The highest leaves sheath most of the stem, while the grooved lowest leaf is the longest, being at least as high as the inflorescence. The corm is rounded and small (2 cm) with a rough, fibrous tunic.

== Distribution and habitat ==
The distribution of Gladiolus patersoniae extends from Uitenhage in the Eastern Cape, across the Little Karoo region, to as far west as the alluvial gravel plains around Worcester in the Western Cape. Its range extends south into the Overberg region as far as the coast near Cape Infanta.

This species usually occurs in Fynbos vegetation, in rocky mountainous or exposed hill-slope habitats. It is most common in sandstone-derived sands, and in areas of winter rainfall.
