= Gamkaberg Nature Reserve =

Nature reserve in the Western Cape, South Africa

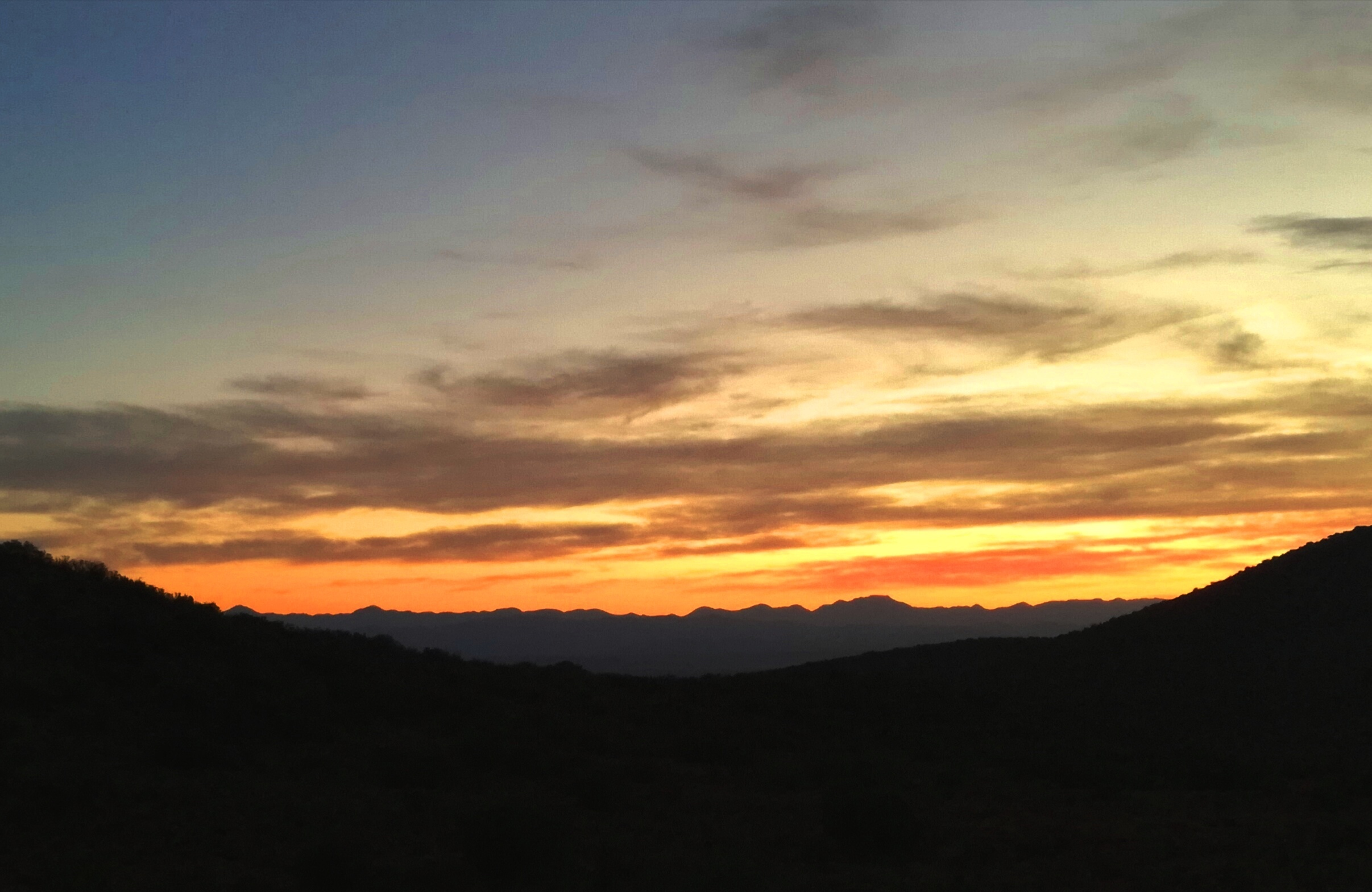
- Gamkaberg sunrise.

- Location within Western Cape
- Location: Western Cape, South Africa
- Nearest city: Oudtshoorn
- Coordinates: 33°43′20″S 21°54′30″E
- Area: 94 km^{2} (36 sq mi)
- Established: 1974
- Governing body: CapeNature
- Website: www.capenature.co.za/reserves/gamkaberg-nature-reserve/

The Gamkaberg Nature Reserve is situated in the Little Karoo region of the Western Cape province, South Africa.

== Name and history ==
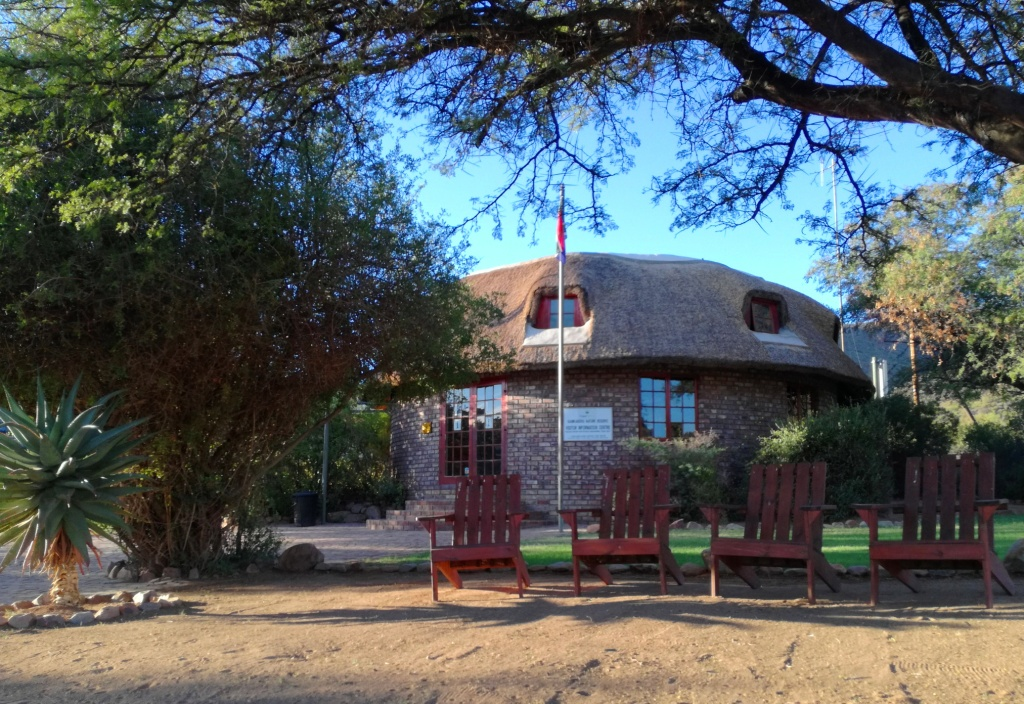
Visitors centre of the Gamkaberg Nature Reserve

The reserve takes its name from the central mountain, Gamkaberg, which in turn derives its name from the indigenous Khoi-khoi word for Lion, together with the Afrikaans suffix "-berg", meaning mountain.

The reserve was established in 1974 to protect one of the region's last remaining herds of Cape mountain zebra (which numbered only five surviving animals in 1976), and to reintroduce game which formerly occurred in the region.

It has since been declared a World Heritage Site. The core reserve is 10,430 ha (25,800 acres; 104.3 km^{2}; 40.3 sq mi), but the greater Gamkaberg Conservation Area comprises a variety of different protected surrounding areas, and includes 80,000 ha (200,000 acres; 800 km^{2}; 310 sq mi).

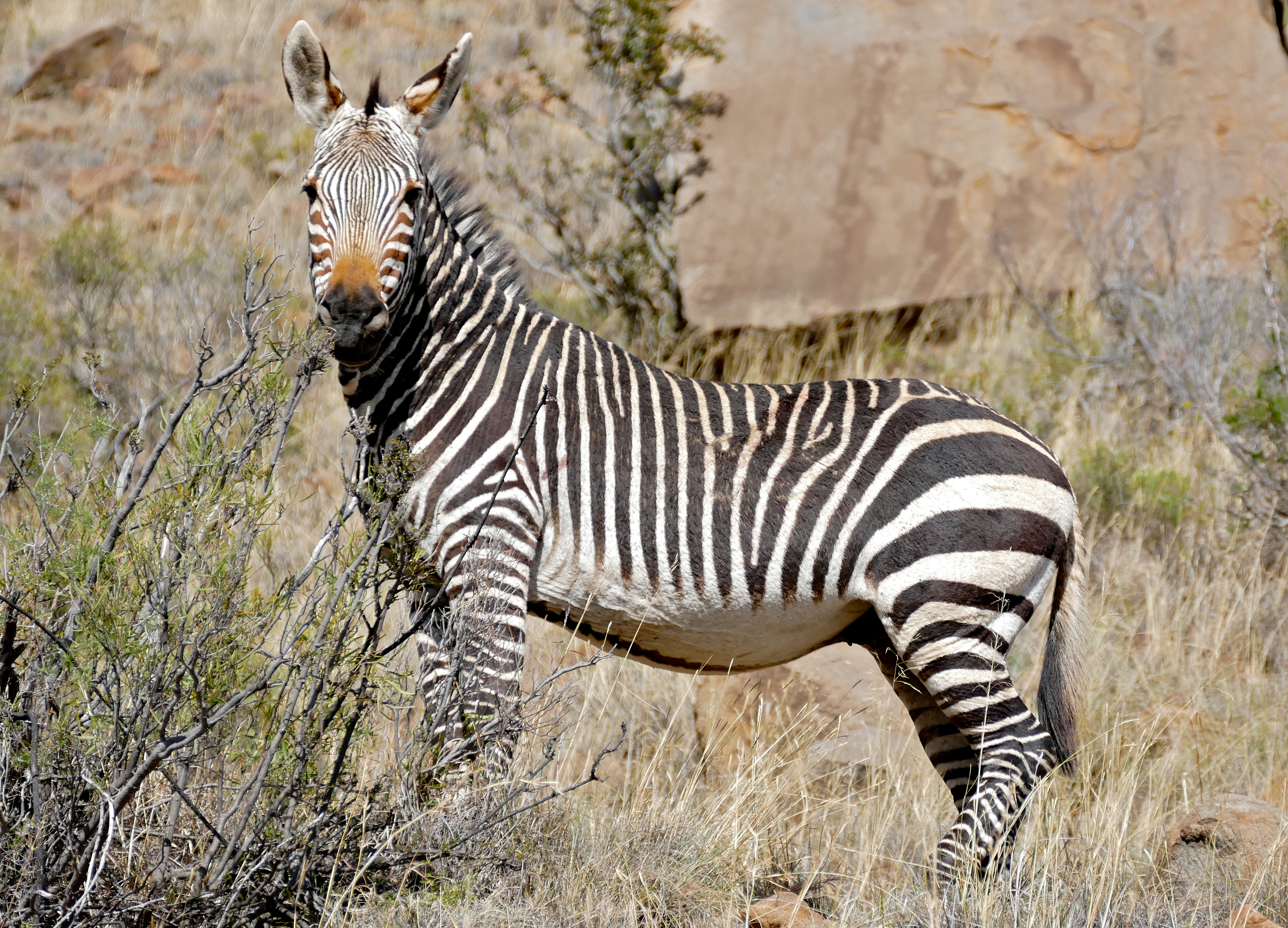
The Cape Mountain Zebra, the species for which the reserve was originally created

== Location ==
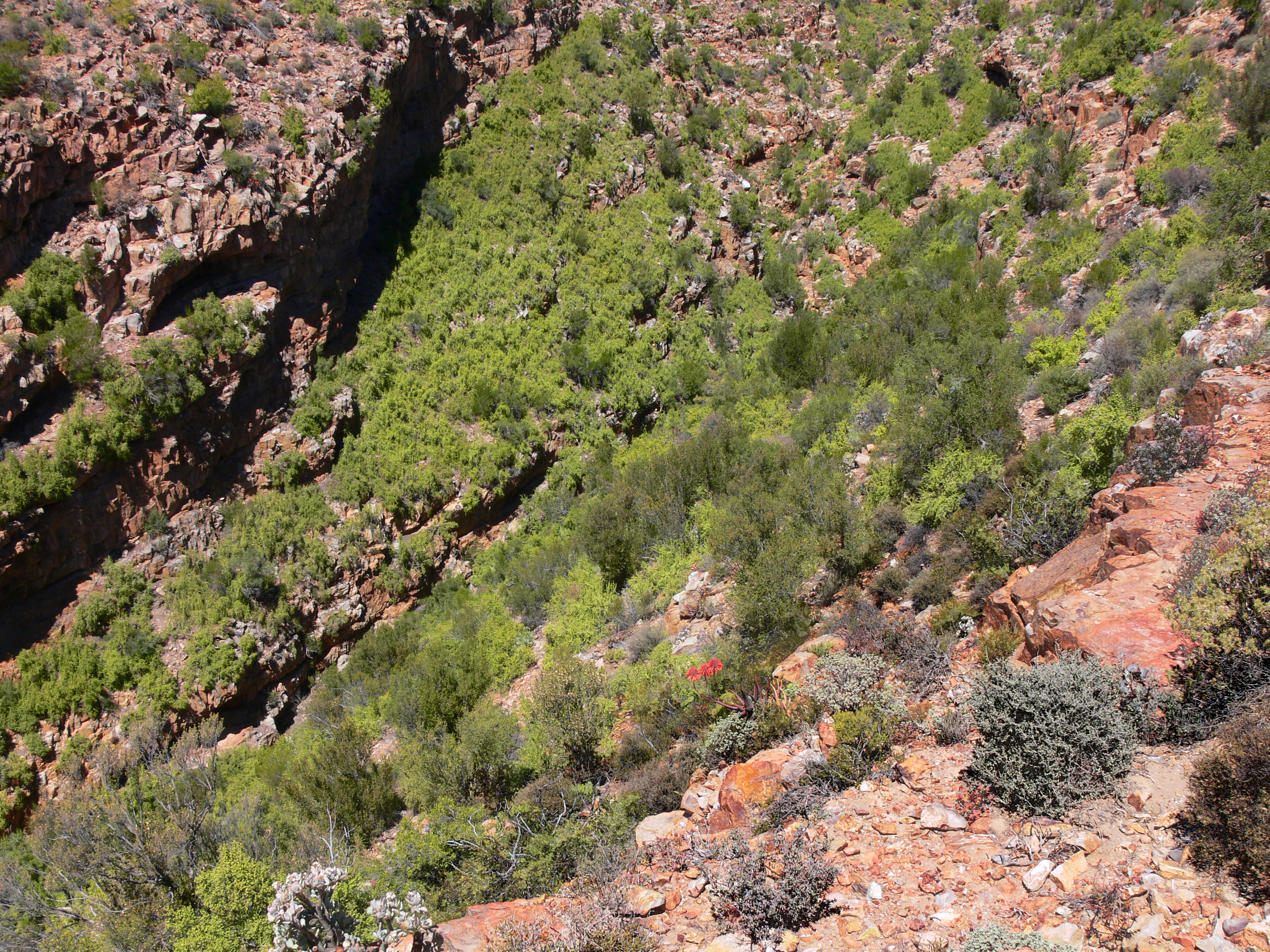
Mountainous terrain and vegetation of the reserve

The terrain of the Gamkaberg is varied, including mountain peaks, plateaus and steep gorges. Fossils and stone age paintings or rock art are also present in the reserve.

The nearest towns are Calitzdorp to the north-west; Oudtshoorn to the north-east; and Vanwyksdorp to the south. The mountains which compose the nature reserve form a separate range, within the Little Karoo. The mountain to the west of the Gamkaberg, part of the same range, is also conserved as a nature reserve named the Rooiberg Nature Reserve and the Groenefontein Nature Reserve forms part of that same conservation area, and they are managed together.

The river which flows southwards past the reserve shares its name. The Gamka River begins far to the north in the arid Great Karoo and flows southwards towards the ocean.

== Fauna and Flora ==
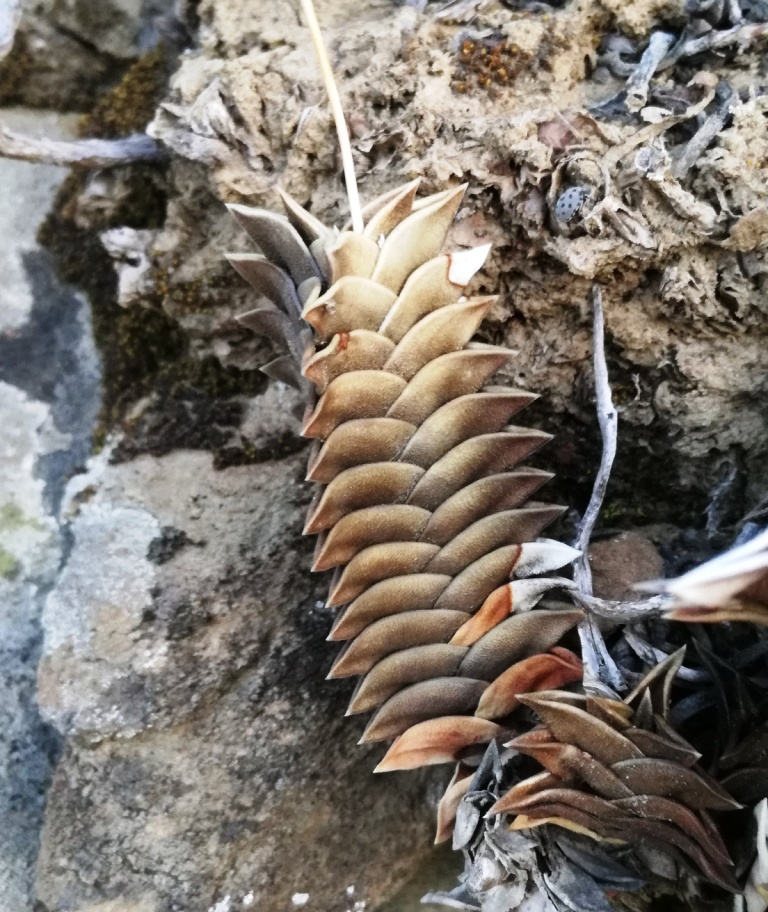
Haworthiopsis viscosa in the Gamkaberg

Other than the large numbers of Cape Mountain Zebra, other large mammals include leopard, caracal, aardwolf, black-backed jackal, hartebeest, grysbok, and a wide range of other antelope species. The reserve is also home to an unusually large range of reptile and bird species.

The flora of the Cape region is one of the richest on the planet. Four of the Cape biomes occur in the Gamkaberg: Fynbos, Succulent Karoo, Subtropical Thicket, and Evergreen Forest.

== Access and accommodation ==
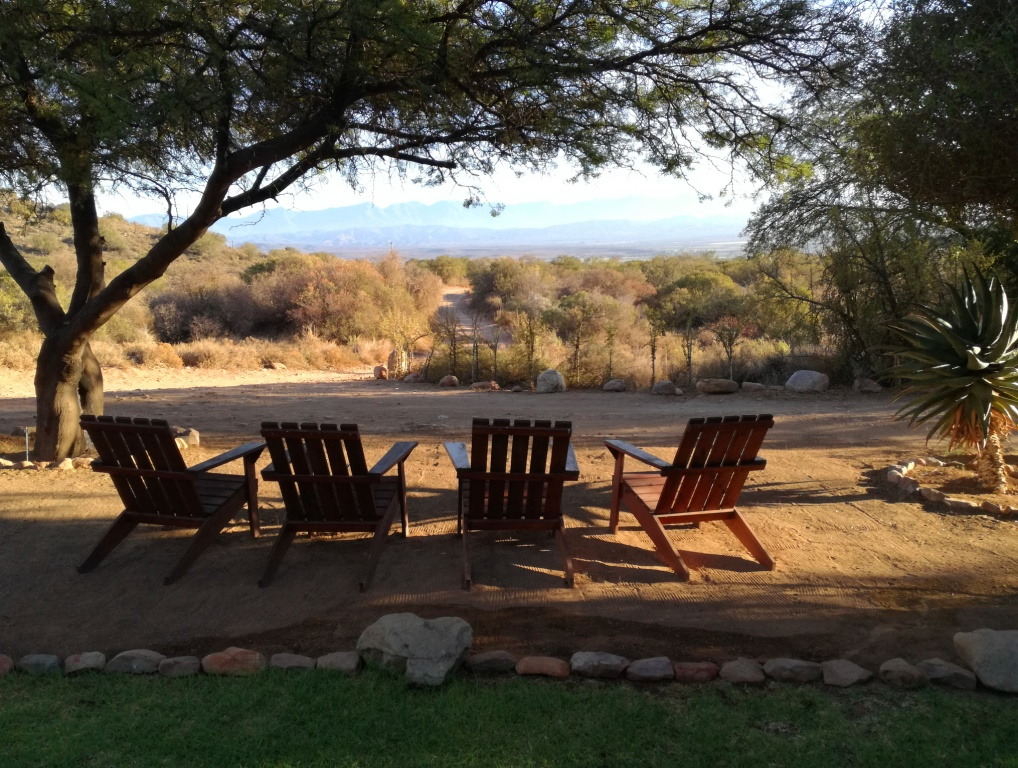

The nature reserve is open daily for visitors. Accommodation in the nature reserve includes eco-lodges and a campsite, as well as several remote stone shelters in the mountains, which are remains of herders' huts. Accommodation is deliberately rustic and simple, so as to have a minimum effect on the surrounding wildlife and environment.

== Activities ==
In addition to the animal and plant life, the reserve has an information centre, hiking and 4x4 routes, educational trails, labyrinth, as well as picnic and barbecue facilities.

== Official website ==
- Gamkaberg Nature Reserve
