= Gouritz Cluster Biosphere Reserve =

Protected area in the southern part of South Africa

- Location within South Africa
- Interactive map of Gouritz Cluster Biosphere Reserve
- Location: Western Cape, South Africa
- Nearest city: Laingsburg, Western Cape
- Coordinates: 33.8681°S 21.6753°E
- Area: 3,187,893 ha (7,877,460 acres)
- Established: 7 March 2015; 11 years ago
- Governing body: Gouritz Cluster Biosphere Reserve

The Gouritz Cluster Biosphere Reserve is located in the Western Cape of South Africa. It is the 7th and largest of South Africa’s biosphere reserves; divided into four connected sectors ranging from sea level to 2,240 metres. The area is the only place in the world where three recognised biodiversity hotspots converge (Fynbos, Succulent Karoo and Maputaland-Pondoland-Albany). The site is characterised by high endemism of plant species (1,325 species including 182 Succulent Karoo endemics and 92 Red List species) and threatened invertebrates including seven endemic species of the enigmatic beetle genus Colophon and 14 butterfly species. It provides a migratory route for large mammals such as the leopard and serves as a nursery for marine species.

Notwithstanding the richness in biodiversity, the area currently faces deep rooted socio-economic challenges including high unemployment, wide-spread poverty, sprawling informal settlements with inadequate services, rising HIV and crime rates.

== Ecological characteristics ==
Because of its relatively large size, the proposed biosphere reserve is subdivided into four sectors or clusters: Towerkop, Kammanassie, Langeberg and St. Blaize. The landscape is characterised by remarkable variety and transition. Along the shore fine-grained sandy beaches and dunes alternate with wave-cut platforms and exposed headlands. Deeply incised river valleys cut into the coastal platform, terminating in estuaries and forming coastal lagoons in places. The Outeniqua and Langeberg Mountains separate the coastal region from the Little Karoo, forming a natural barrier between the southern cape and the interior. Further inland the Kammanassi, Kouga and Swartberg mountain ranges form the northern and eastern boundaries of the reserve.

The Gouritz Cluster Biosphere Reserve is the only area in the world where three recognised biodiversity hotspots converge (Fynbos, Succulent Karoo and Maputaland-Pondoland-Albany). The entire domain falls within the Cape Floristic Region, the smallest but one of the richest of the six floral kingdoms of the world. The reserve is rich in endemic plant species with more than 670 plant species. Even the arid inland portion of the reserve is rich in endemic species with at least 400 plant species.

In terms of fauna, the reserve plays an important role in conserving two unique and threatened populations of Cape mountain zebra (Equus zebra zebra) and Bontebok (Damaliscus pyrgargus pyrgargus). Populations of leopard (Panthera pardus) are also present in most of the mountainous areas. Threatened invertebrates include seven endemic species of the enigmatic beetle genus Colophon and 14 endemic butterfly species.

The reserve includes three recognised UNESCO World Heritage Sites: the Swartberg Complex, Boosmansbos Nature Reserve and Baviaanskloof.

== Socio-economic characteristics ==
Rural communities primarily consist of farmers and farm dwellers, the former mostly of European descent and the latter identified mainly as members of the Cape Coloured community. Many are descendants of the area’s original inhabitants, the ancient Khoisan people. The primary economic activity across these communities is intensive agriculture, including ostrich, dairy, citrus, wine and grain, combined with extensive grazing of cattle and sheep for meat as well as wool production. Tourism is also an important industry in the reserve, however the industry is still poorly developed in rural sections of the area.

The area is facing deep-rooted socio-economic challenges including high unemployment, wide-spread poverty, sprawling informal settlements with inadequate services, rising HIV and crime rates.

The reserve is a centre of immense historical significance. Based on recent and ongoing research, the southern Cape coast is believed to be the place where the lineage that led to all modern human beings was born. The caves at Pinnacle Point near Mossel Bay have yielded proof of the earliest human exploitation of shellfish 164,000 years ago, and the earliest known use of fire for technology in making stone tools 72,000 years ago.

== Sources ==
This article incorporates text from a free content work (license statement/permission). Text taken from UNESCO - MAB Biosphere Reserves Directory, UNESCO, UNESCO.
