= Seweweekspoortpiek =

Mountain in South Africa

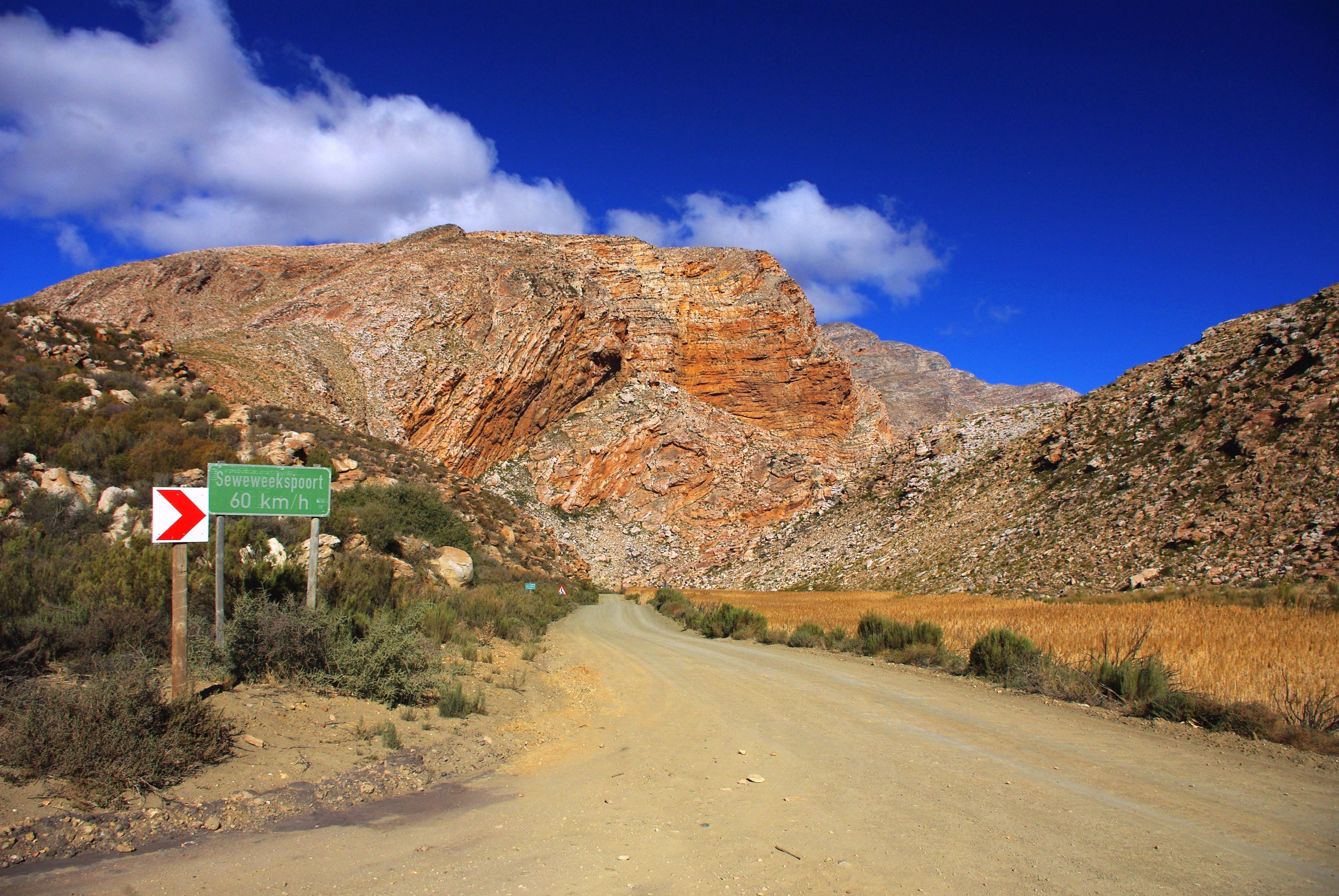

Highest point
- Elevation: 2,325 m (7,628 ft)
- Prominence: 1,543 m (5,062 ft)
- Listing: Ultra; List of mountains in South Africa; Ribu
- Coordinates: 33°23′54″S 21°22′03″E

Geography
- Location within South Africa
- Location: Cape Fold Belt, South Africa
- Parent range: Klein Swartberg

Seweweekspoortpiek (Afrikaans for ‘Seven Weeks Defile Peak’) is a peak in the Western Cape, South Africa. It is the highest mountain in the Cape Fold Belt and the highest point in the Western Cape province. Along with its western neighbour, Du Toits Peak, it qualifies as an Ultra and these are the only two in the country.

It is located in the Klein Swartberg range, close to the Seweweekspoort mountain pass.

== See also ==
- List of Ultras of Africa
