= Ladismith =

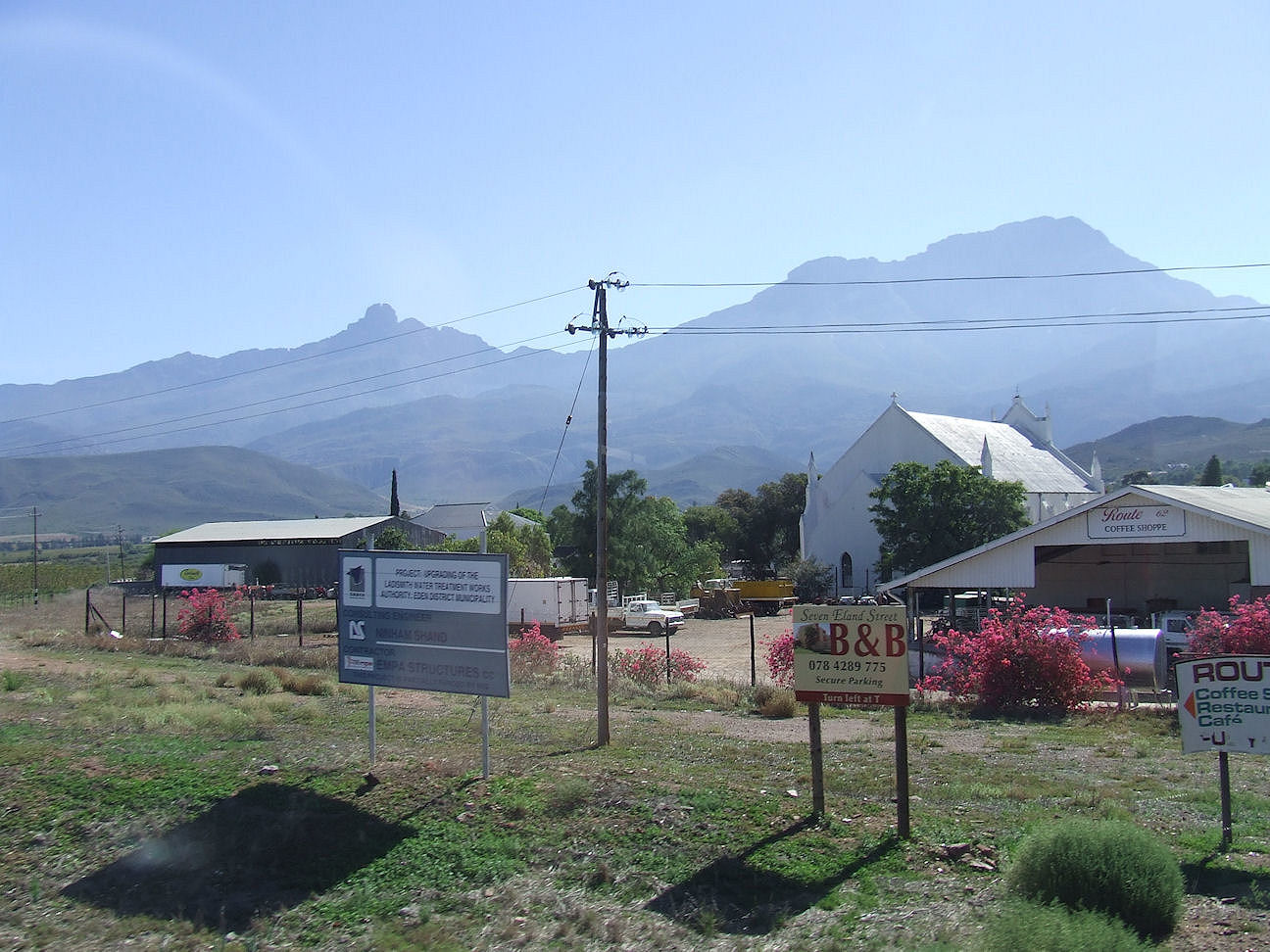
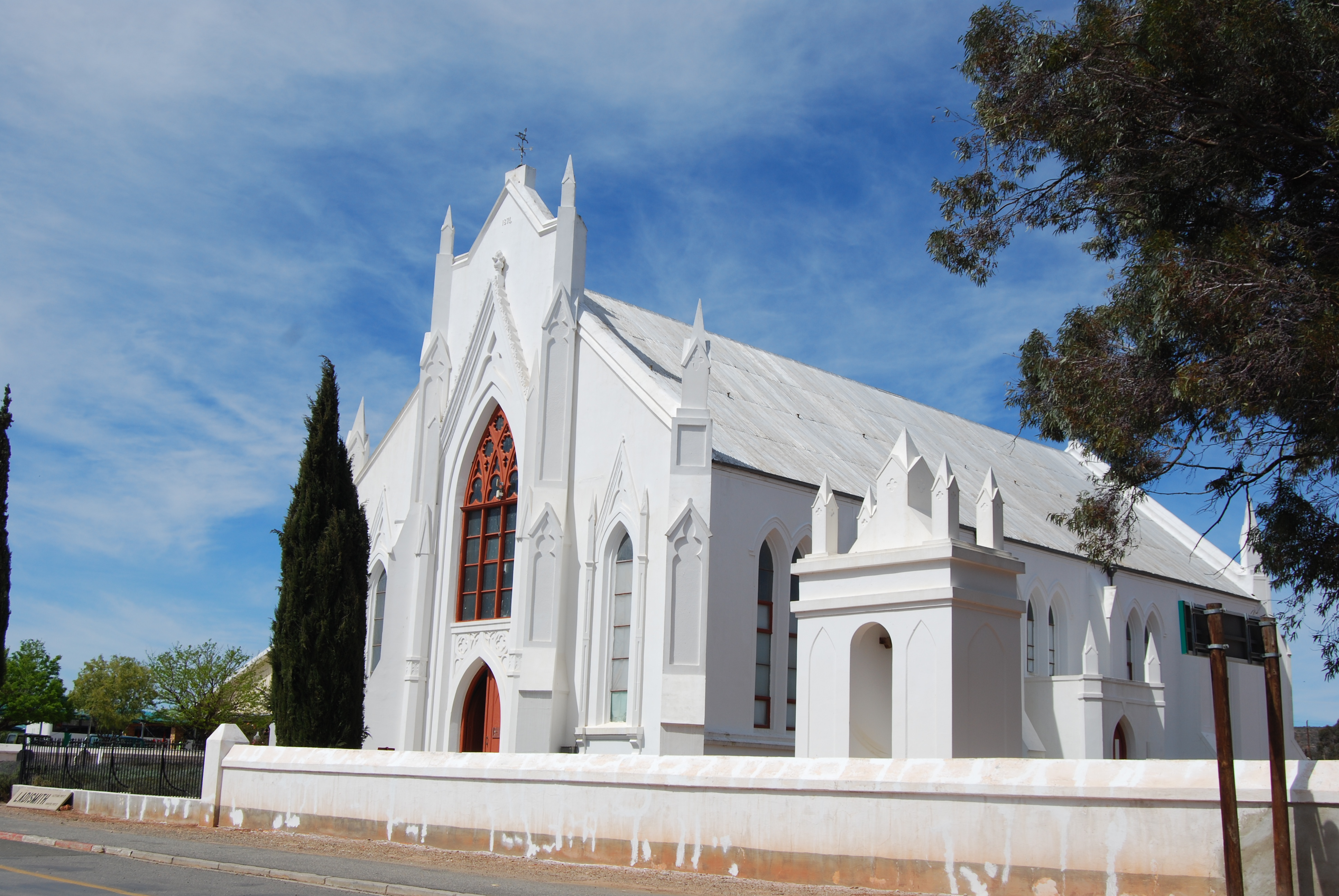
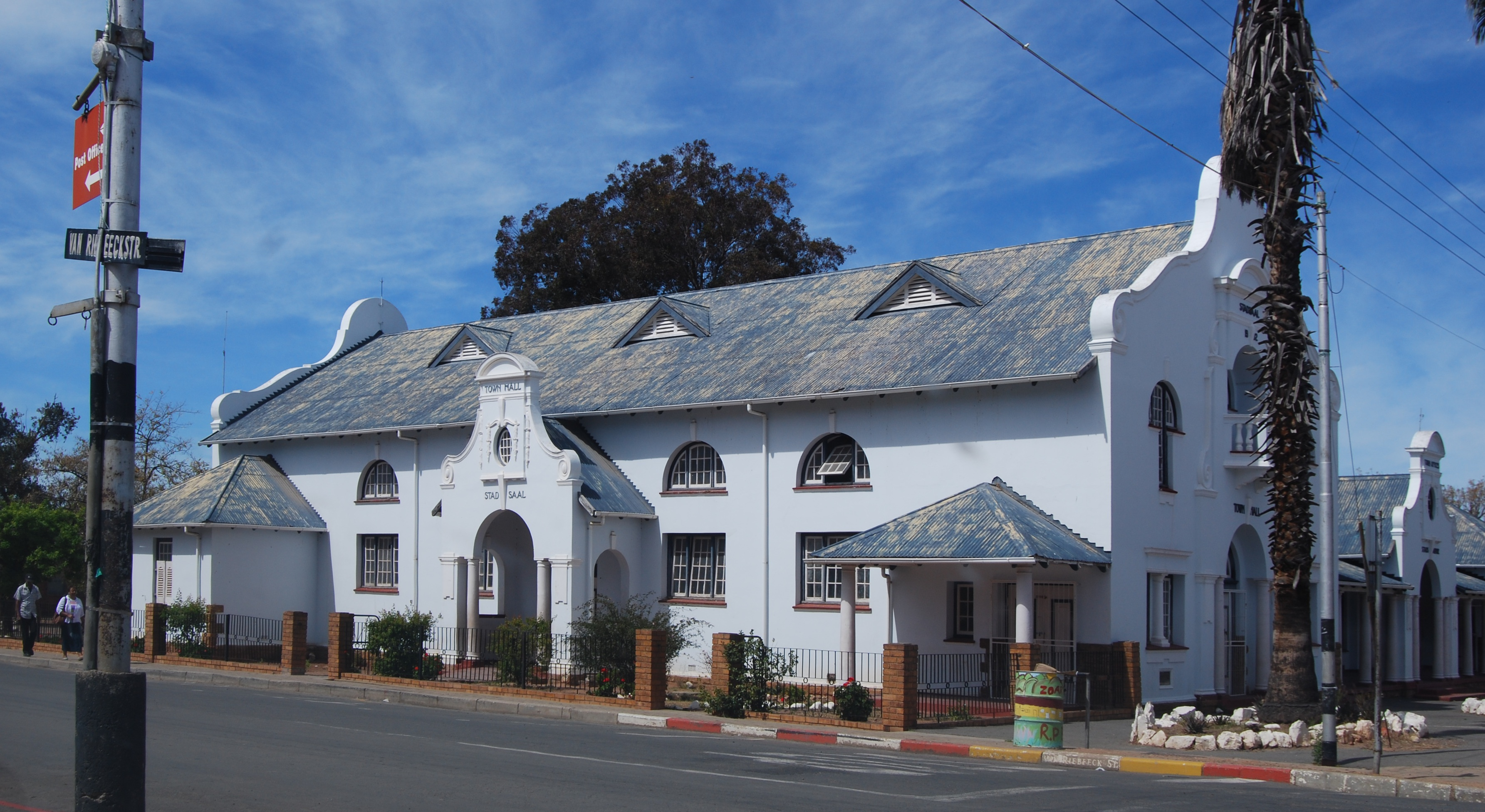
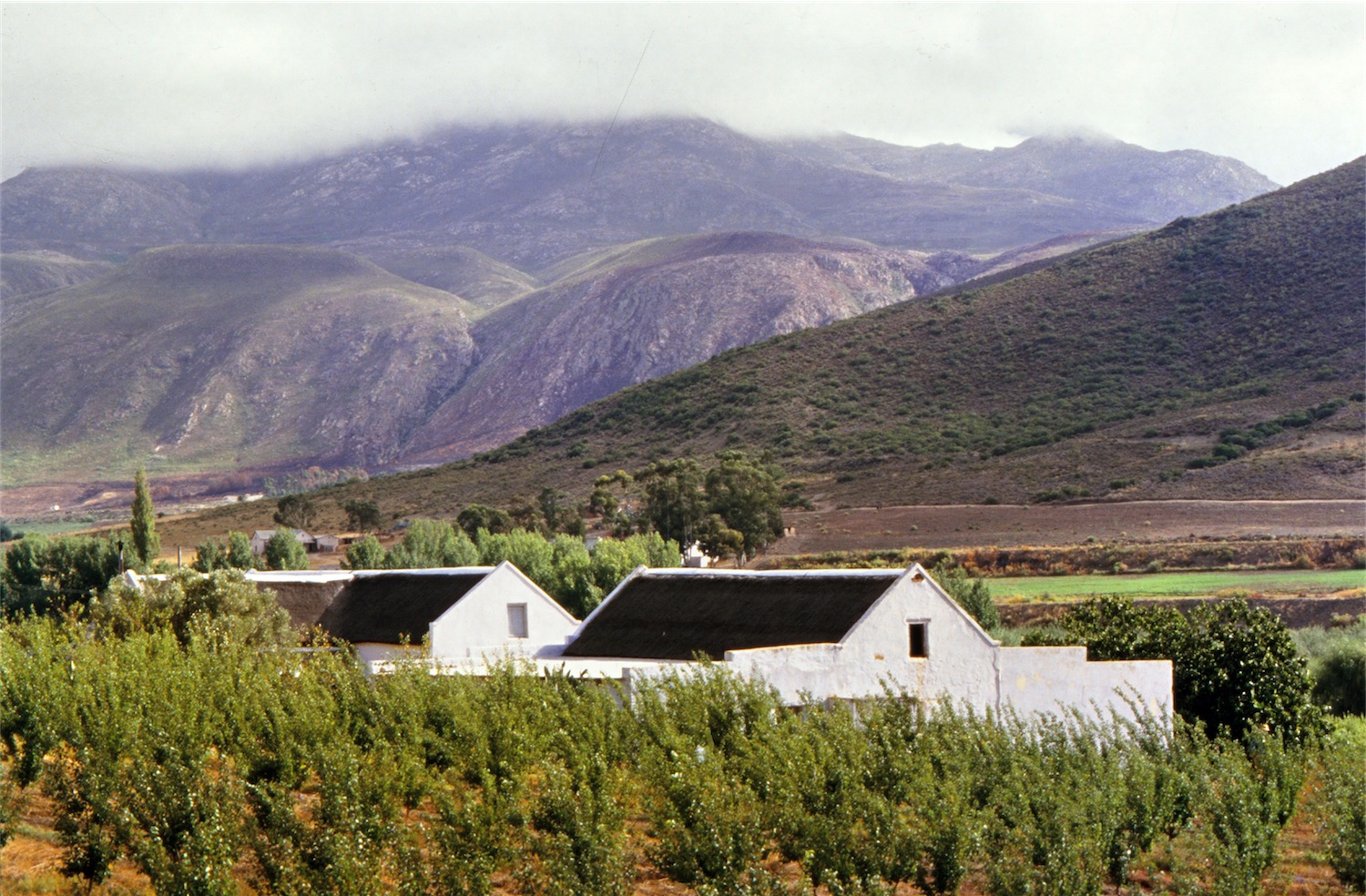
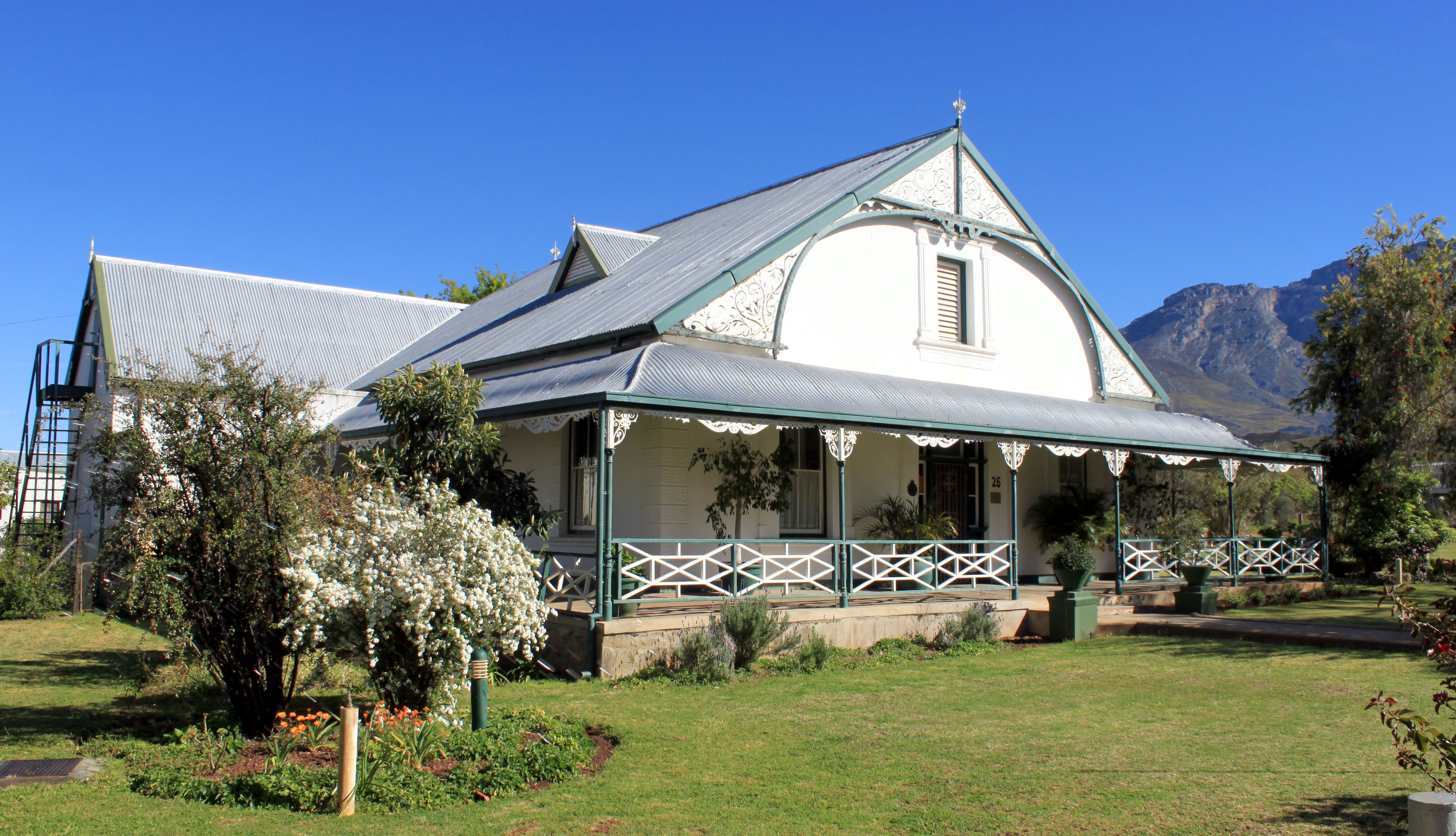
- Clockwise from top: View of Ladismith, Ladismith Town Hall, Albert Manor, Hoeko where C J Langenhoven was born, Dutch Reformed Church.

- Location within Western Cape Location within South Africa
- Coordinates: 33°29′S 21°16′E
- Country: South Africa
- Province: Western Cape
- District: Garden Route
- Municipality: Kannaland

Area
  - Total: 25.8 km^{2} (10.0 sq mi)
- Elevation: 540 m (1,770 ft)

Population (2011)
  - Total: 7,127
  - Density: 276/km^{2} (715/sq mi)

Racial makeup (2011)
  - Black African: 6.4%
  - Coloured: 81.3%
  - Indian/Asian: 0.3%
  - White: 11.5%
  - Other: 0.5%

First languages (2011)
  - Afrikaans: 95.7%
  - English: 1.9%
  - Other: 2.4%
- Time zone: UTC+2 (SAST)
- Postal code (street): 6655
- PO box: 6655
- Area code: 028

Ladismith is a town and agricultural centre in the western Little Karoo region of South Africa's Western Cape province.

== Geography ==
It is situated adjacent to a series of fertile, irrigated valleys, at an elevation of 550 m above sea level, at the southern base of the Swartberg. It is currently included in the southern Kannaland Local Municipality. The nearest towns are Calitzdorp to the east, Vanwyksdorp and Riversdale to the south and Laingsburg to the north.

== History ==
In 1852 the farm Elandsvlei was set aside for the town, and it became a municipality in 1862. It was named after Lady Juana María de los Dolores de León Smith, the wife of Sir Harry Smith, one of two towns in South Africa named after her, the other being Ladysmith in KwaZulu-Natal.

== Ladismith Cheese Company ==
In 1999 the Ladismith Cheese Company (PTY) ltd was established and is now known for their variety of cheeses. The company also produces powdered milk. It has competent workers such as Marvin Marvelous Abelse which is the most famous person in the town [Main operator], one of many and Maintenance. The main focus of this group is to look after the CIP and produce powdered milk and clean milk Silos.
