= Calitzdorp =

Town in Western Cape, South Africa

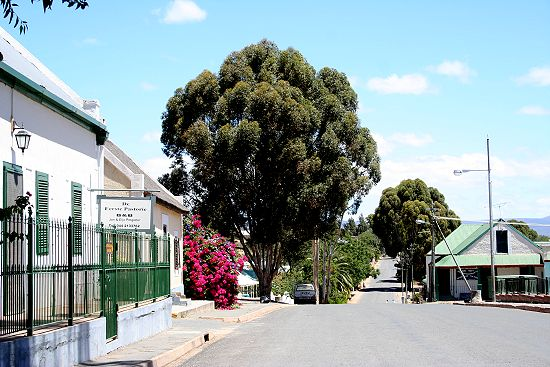
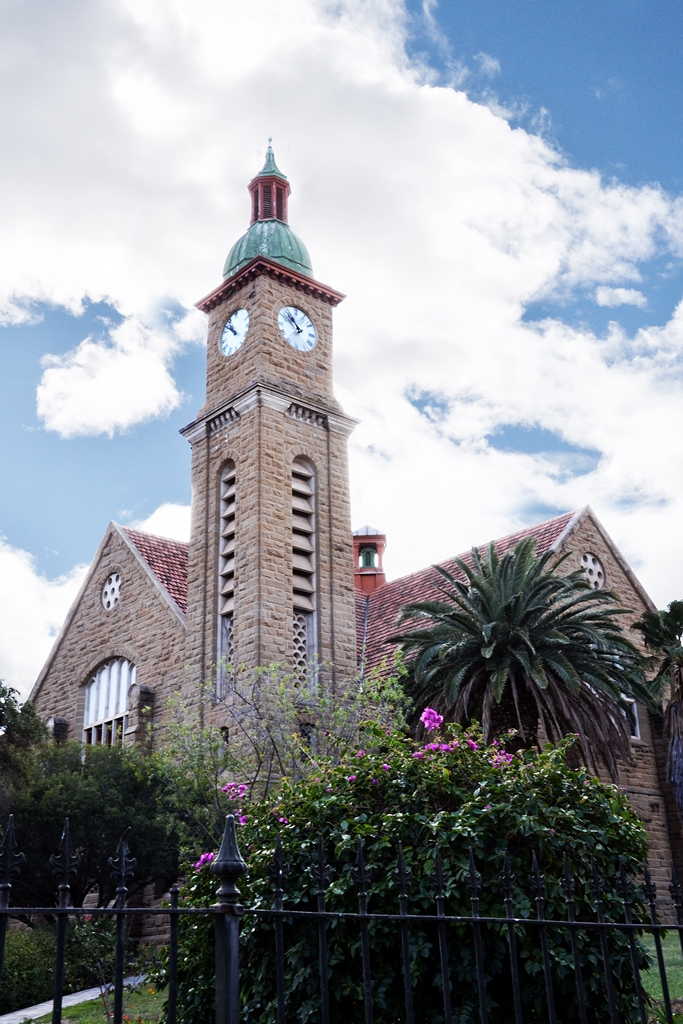
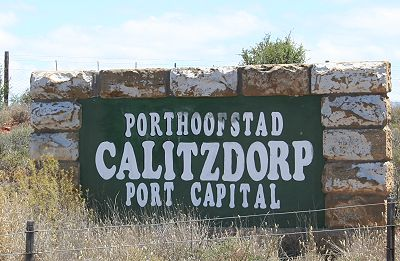
- Clockwise from Top: Calitzdorp Main Road, Calitzdorp sign, Dutch Reformed Church of Calitzdorp.

- Location within Western Cape Location within South Africa
- Coordinates: 33°32′15″S 21°41′07″E
- Country: South Africa
- Province: Western Cape
- District: Garden Route
- Municipality: Kannaland
- Proclaimed: 1909

Area
  - Total: 26.33 km^{2} (10.17 sq mi)
- Elevation: 240 m (790 ft)

Population (2011)
  - Total: 4,284
  - Density: 162.7/km^{2} (421.4/sq mi)

Racial makeup (2011)
  - Black African: 4.3%
  - Coloured: 85.5%
  - Indian/Asian: 0.5%
  - White: 8.9%
  - Other: 0.8%

First languages (2011)
  - Afrikaans: 94.2%
  - English: 3.3%
  - Other: 2.5%
- Time zone: UTC+2 (SAST)
- Postal code (street): 6660
- PO box: 6660
- Area code: 044

Calitzdorp is a town on the Western side of the Little or Klein Karoo in the Western Cape Province of South Africa and lies on South Africa's Route 62.

== History ==
The land on which Calitzdorp is situated was originally granted to Jacobus Johannes and Matthys Christian Calitz in 1821. They named the farm Buffelsvlei, after the local vegetation and wildlife found in the area.

In 1853, the Calitz brothers donated part of their farmland for the construction of a church. By 1858, the church had begun selling plots to members of the congregation.

Calitzdorp was officially proclaimed a town in 1909. By 1910, the town’s population had grown to around 4,000, creating the need for a larger church and school. Both buildings were completed in 1912. The church, built in a Neo-Byzantine style with a Marseilles-tiled roof. It was declared a national monument in 1991.

Construction also began in 1912 on the old Standard Bank building, which now houses the local museum, as well as the Calitzdorp Dam. The dam wall was one of first in South Africa to be built using concrete. However, the town later faced several setbacks, including droughts, the great influenza epidemic, and the collapse of the ostrich feather industry.

The town continued to develop after the construction of the railway line to Oudtshoorn in 1924. This was followed by electrification and the completion of the first concrete road between Calitzdorp and Oudtshoorn in 1937. The new R62 route was completed in 1978.

== Geography ==
=== Topography ===
The Swartberg (in the North), Rooiberge (to the South) and the Mountains of the Huisrivier Pass (to the West) surrounds Calitzdorp's challenging landscape with floods, droughts and extreme weather, from very hot to snow clad mountaintops in the winter.

=== Climate ===
Summers are very hot during the day, mainly a dry heat, up to 40 °C. Wind from the sea every afternoon allows for moderate, cool evenings. Winters have sunny days, very cold nights with occasional frost and snow often falling on the surrounding Swartberg Mountain Range. Rainfall is approximately 200 mm per year, often with the changing of seasons. Prevailing winds are mainly from the south in summer and hot wind from the North in August.

== Demographics ==
Population census

Year	Pop.	±% p.a.
1904	509	—
1911	724	+5.16%
1921	1,727	+9.08%
1936	1,993	+0.96%
1946	1,933	−0.31%
1951	2,134	+2.00%

Year	Pop.	±% p.a.
1960	2,299	+0.83%
1970	2,575	+1.14%
1980	2,880	+1.13%
2001	3,188	+0.48%
2011	4,284	+3.00%

== Tourism ==
Calitzdorp is a haven for enthusiasts of fishing, bird-watching, 4×4 and other scenic routes, horse-riding and wine tasting.

Calitzdorp is renowned as a centre of the port wine industry in South Africa with several major wine estates famous for their award-winning products. A Port festival takes place in the town in mid-June each year.
