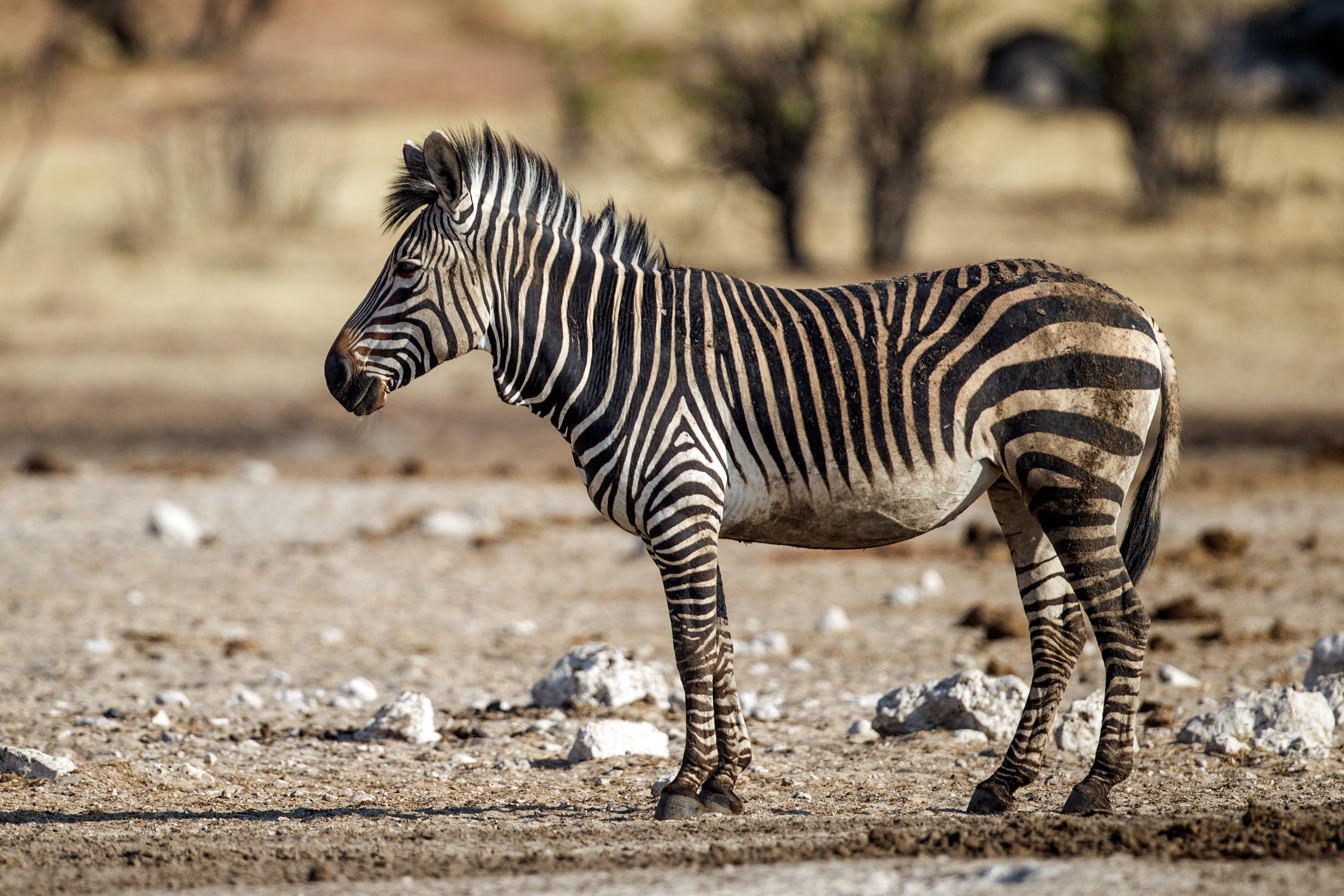
- Hartmann's mountain zebra (E. zebra hartmannae) in Etosha National Park, Namibia

Conservation status
- Vulnerable (IUCN 3.1)
- CITES Appendix II

Scientific classification
- Kingdom: Animalia
- Phylum: Chordata
- Class: Mammalia
- Order: Perissodactyla
- Family: Equidae
- Genus: Equus
- Subgenus: Hippotigris
- Species: E. zebra

Binomial name
- Equus zebra Linnaeus, 1758

Subspecies
- Equus zebra zebra; Equus zebra hartmannae; see text
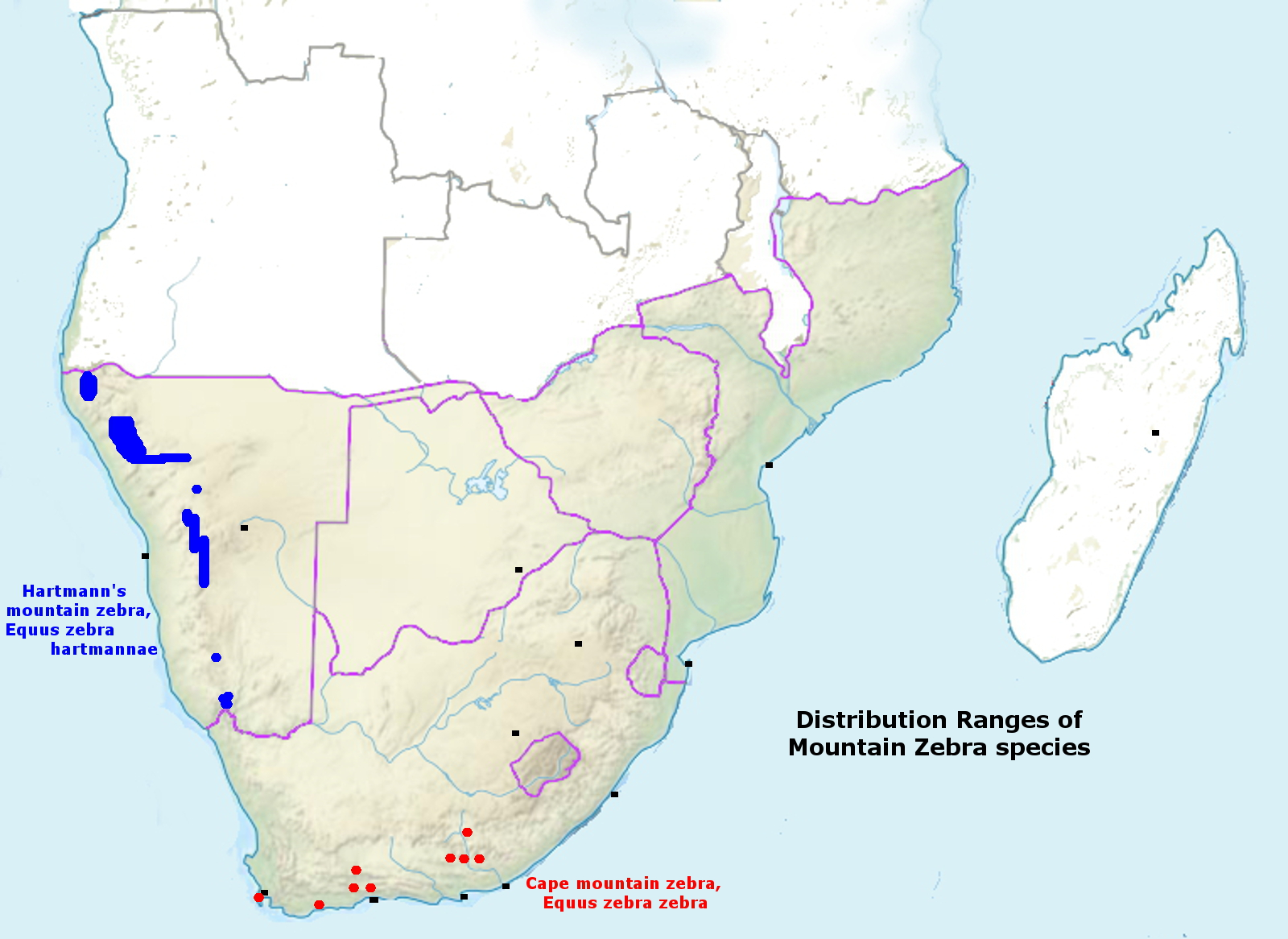
- Range map of Equus zebra zebra in red and Equus zebra hartmannae in blue

= Mountain zebra =

Mountain zebra Temporal range: Pleistocene - Recent

Species of zebra

The mountain zebra (Equus zebra) is a zebra species in the family Equidae, native to southwestern Africa. There are two subspecies, the Cape mountain zebra (E. z. zebra) found in South Africa and Hartmann's mountain zebra (E. z. hartmannae) found in south-western Angola and Namibia.

== Taxonomy ==
The mountain zebra comprises two subspecies:

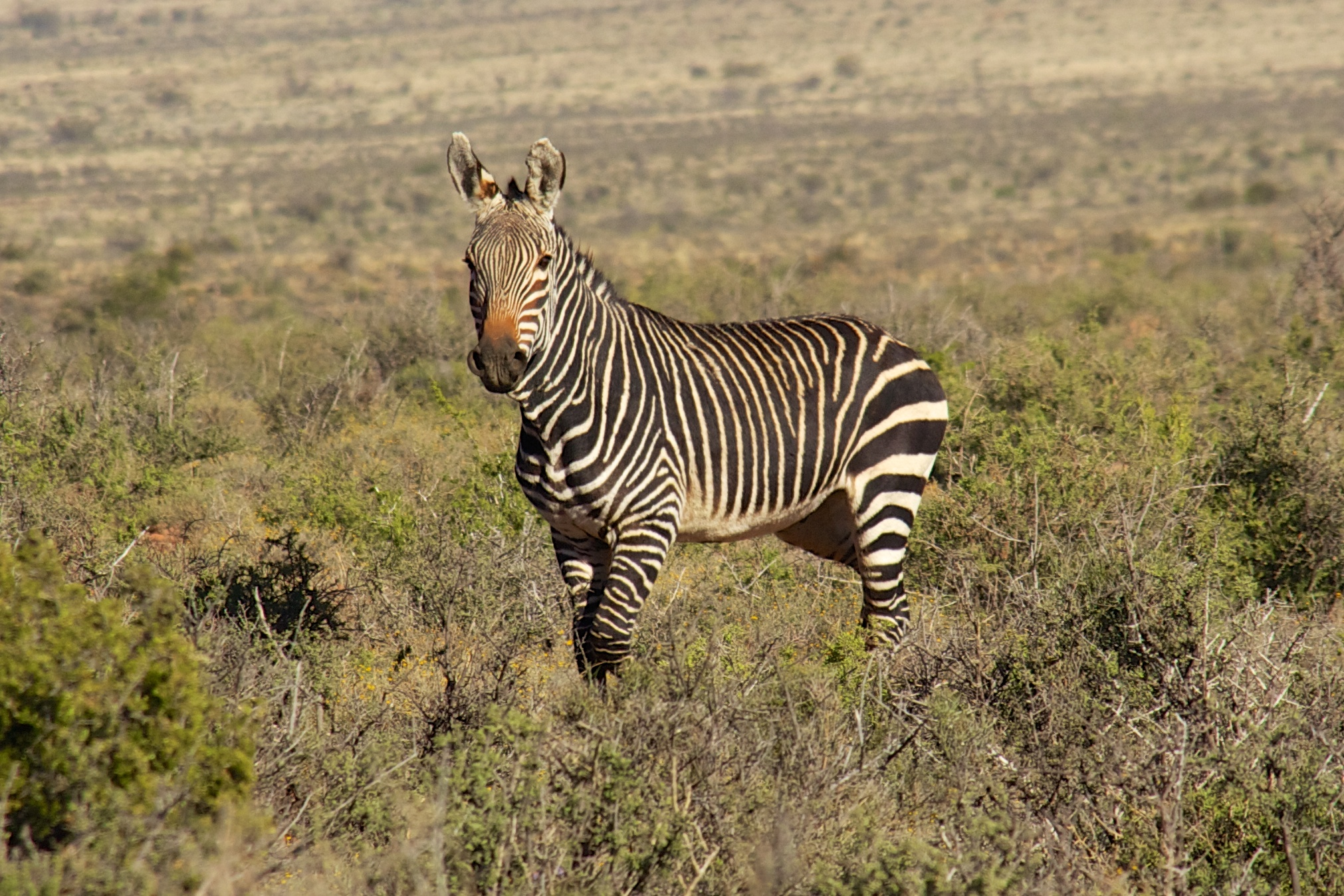
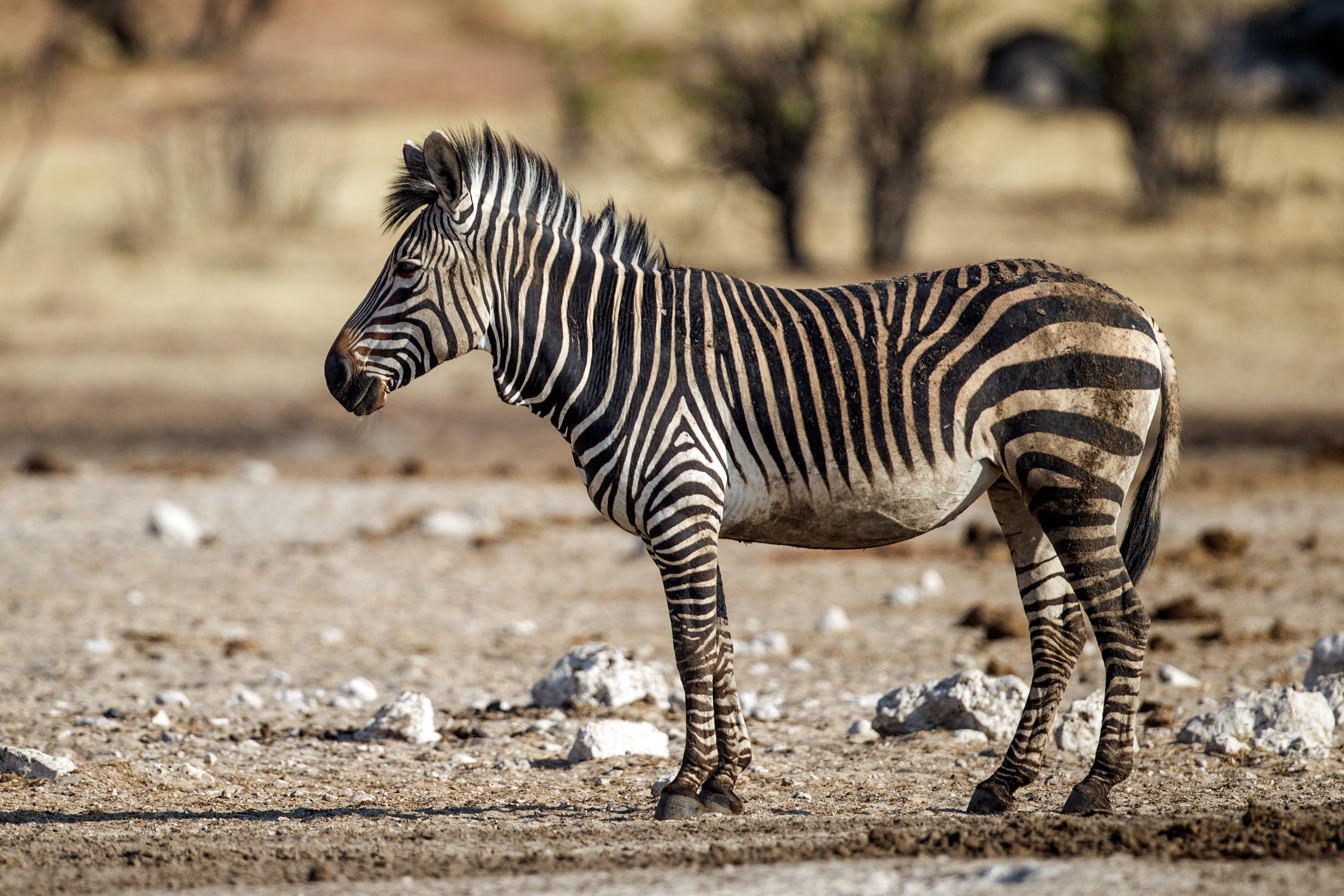
Image	Subspecies	Distribution
	Cape mountain zebra (E. z. zebra)	Western and Eastern Cape provinces of South Africa.
	Hartmann's mountain zebra (E. z. hartmannae)	south-western Angola and western Namibia.

In 2004, C. P. Groves and C. H. Bell investigated the taxonomy of the zebras (genus Equus, subgenus Hippotigris). They concluded that the Cape mountain zebra (Equus zebra zebra) and Hartmann's mountain zebra (Equus zebra hartmannae) are distinct, and suggested that the two would be better classified as separate species, Equus zebra and Equus hartmannae.

However, in a sexual genetic study that included 295 mountain zebra specimens, Moodley and Harley (2005) found nothing to support the separation of the two mountain zebra populations into separate species. They concluded that the Cape mountain zebra and Hartmann's mountain zebra should remain as subspecies.

This is consistent with the third edition of Mammal Species of the World (2005), which lists the mountain zebra as a single species (Equus zebra) with two subspecies.

== Appearance ==
A Hartmann's mountain zebra with a Barbary sheep behind it, in captivity at Ueno Zoo, Japan

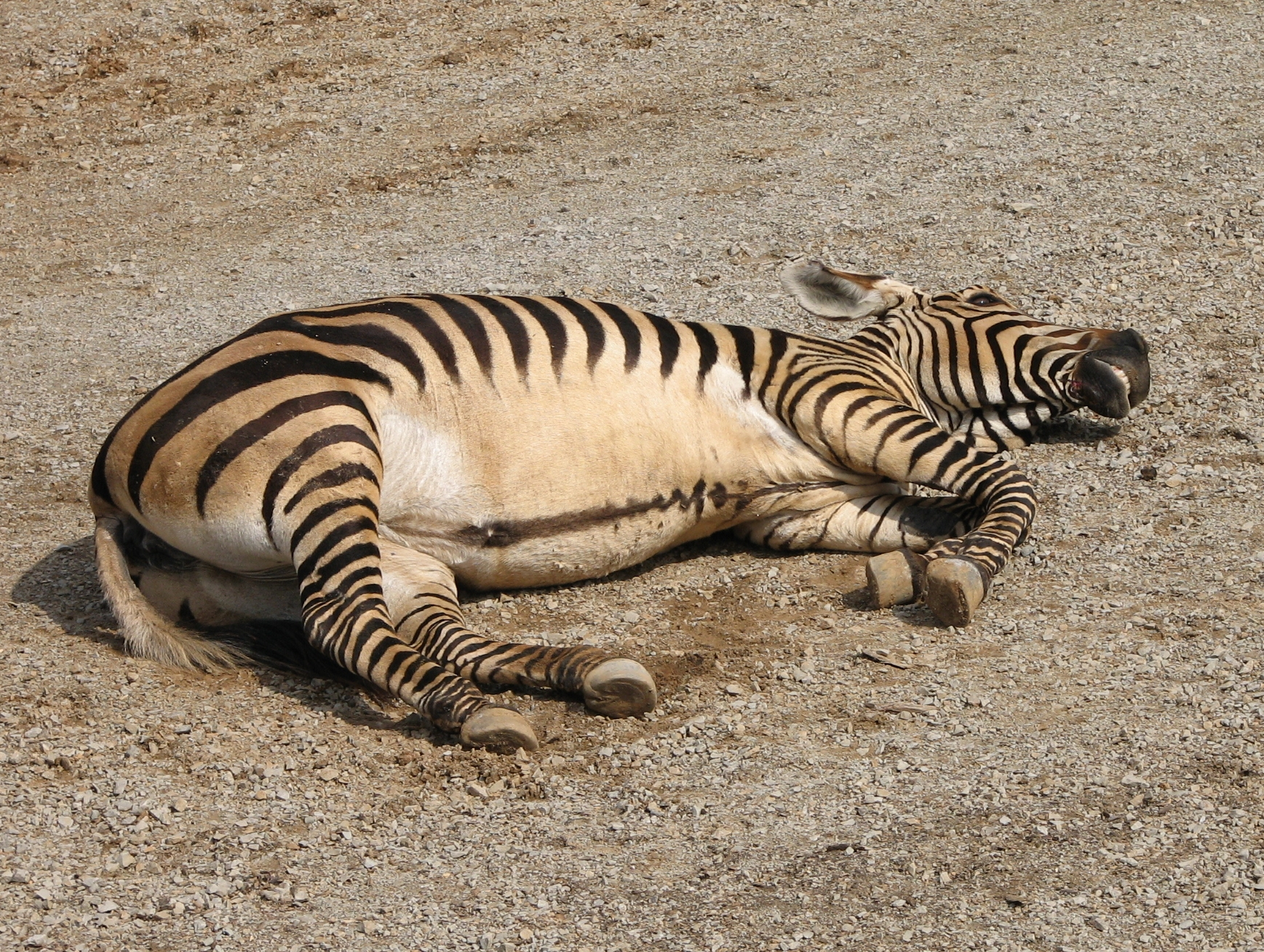
Hartmann's mountain zebra resting, showing its characteristic essentially unbarred belly

The mountain zebra has a dewlap, which is more conspicuous in E. z. zebra than in E. z. hartmannae. Like all extant zebras, mountain zebras are boldly striped in black or dark brown, and no two individuals look exactly alike. The whole body is striped except for the belly. In the Cape mountain zebra, the ground colour is effectively white, but the ground colour in Hartmann's zebra is slightly buff.

Adult mountain zebras have a head-and-body length of 2.1 to 2.6 m (6 ft 11 in to 8 ft 6 in) and a tail of 40 to 55 cm (16 to 22 in) long. Wither height ranges from 1.16 to 1.5 m (3 ft 10 in to 4 ft 11 in). They weigh from 204 to 372 kg (450 to 820 lb).

Groves and Bell found that Cape mountain zebras exhibit sexual dimorphism, females being larger than males, whereas Hartmann's mountain zebras do not. Hartmann's zebra is on average slightly larger than the Cape mountain zebra.

== Habitat ==
Mountain zebras are found on mountain slopes, open grasslands, woodlands, and areas with sufficient vegetation, but their preferred habitat is mountainous terrain, especially escarpment with a diversity of grass species.

== Ecology ==
Mountain zebras live in hot, dry, rocky, mountainous and hilly habitats. They prefer slopes and plateaus as high as 2,000 m (6,600 ft) above sea level, although they do migrate lower during winter. Their preferred diet is tufted grass, primarily Themeda triandra, but in times of shortage, they browse, eating bark, twigs, leaves, buds, fruit, and roots. Other grasses consumed include Cymbopogon pospischilii, Heteropogon contortus, Setaria sphacelata, and Enneapogon scoparius.

They drink every day. When no surface water is available due to drought, they commonly dig for ground water in dry river beds.

The Cape mountain zebra and Hartmann's mountain zebra are now allopatric, meaning that their present ranges do not overlap, which prevents them from crossbreeding. This was not always so, and the current situation is a result of their populations being fragmented when hunters exterminated them throughout the Northern Cape Province of South Africa. Historically, mountain zebras could be found across the entire length of the escarpments along the west coast of southern Africa and in the fold mountain region in the south. However, they generally inhabited poorly productive land and were nowhere really numerous in comparison to those species of zebras or antelope that inhabited the plains, for example.

== Behavior and life cycle ==
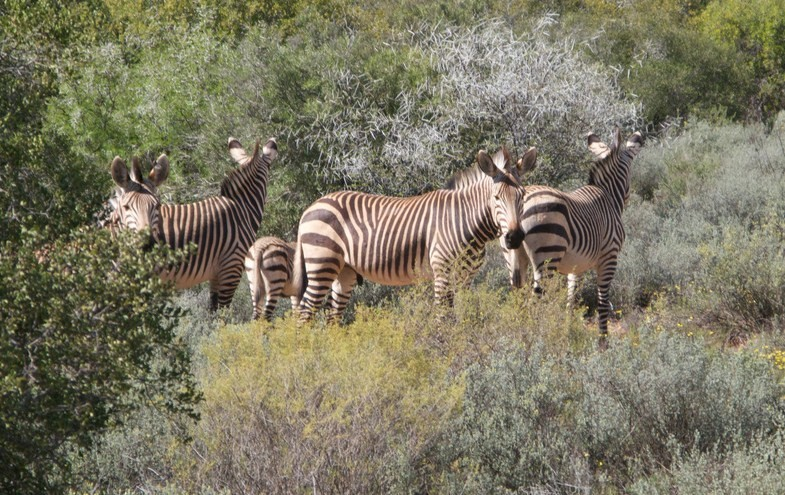
A harem of Cape mountain zebras

Mountain zebras do not aggregate into large herds like plains zebras; they form small family groups consisting of a single stallion and one to five mares, together with their recent offspring. Bachelor males live in separate groups, and mature bachelors attempt to capture young mares to establish a harem. In this they are opposed by the dominant stallion of the group.

Mares give birth to one foal at a time, for about 3 years baby foals gets weaned onto solid forage. Cape mountain zebra foals generally move away from their maternal herds sometime between the ages of 13 and 37 months. However, with Hartmann's mountain zebra, mares try to expel their foals when they are aged around 14 to 16 months. Young males may wander alone for a while before joining a bachelor group, while females are either taken into another breeding herd or are joined by a bachelor male to form a new breeding herd.

== Threats ==
The main threats to the species are the loss of habitat to agriculture, hunting, and persecution. Poaching for food (for example, during guerrilla fighting) has decreased their numbers.

== Conservation ==
The species is listed as vulnerable under the IUCN Red List and both sub-species are included in Appendix II of the Convention on International Trade in Endangered Species (CITES). The Cape mountain zebra was hunted to near extinction. In the 1930s, their population was reduced to about 100 individuals. However, consistent and vigorous conservation measures have succeeded in reversing the decline, and in 1998, the population of the Cape mountain zebra was estimated to have increased to some 1200, about 540 in national parks, 490 in provincial nature reserves, and 165 in other reserves. However, the population has increased to about over 2,700 in the wild due to conservation efforts.

Though both mountain zebra subspecies are currently protected in national parks, they are still threatened. The European Zoos Endangered Species Program and co-operative management of zoo populations worldwide have been set up for them.

== See also ==
- Mountain Zebra National Park
- Protected areas of Namibia#section Naukluft Mountain Zebra Park
- Quagga
- Table Mountain National Park#Table Mountain section
