= Mountain Zebra National Park =

National park in the Eastern Cape province of South Africa

- IUCN category II (national park)
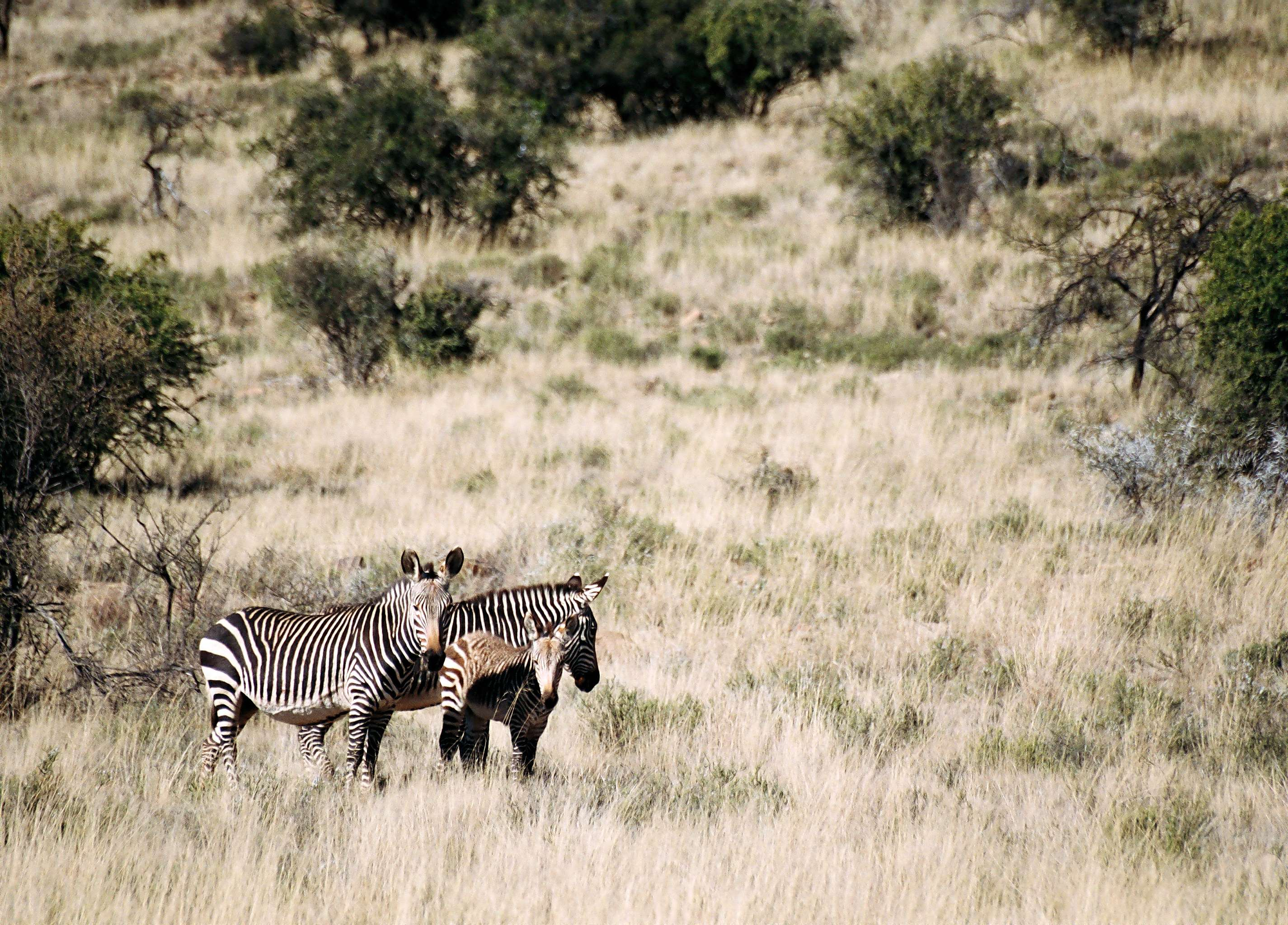
- Location of the park
- Location: Eastern Cape, South Africa
- Nearest city: Cradock
- Coordinates: 32°11′S 25°37′E
- Area: 284 km^{2} (110 sq mi)
- Established: July 2, 1937; 89 years ago
- Visitors: 31 210 (in 2017)
- Governing body: South African National Parks
- Website: www.sanparks.org/parks/mountain-zebra
- Mountain Zebra National Park (South Africa) Mountain Zebra National Park (Eastern Cape)

Mountain Zebra National Park is a national park in the Eastern Cape province of South Africa; established in July 1937 for the purpose of providing a nature reserve for the endangered Cape mountain zebra. It is surrounded by 896,146 hectares (2,214,420 acres; 8,961.46 km^{2}; 3,460.04 sq mi) of the Mountain Zebra-Camdeboo Protected Environment.

== History ==
In the early 1930s, the Cape mountain zebra was threatened with extinction. The National Parks Board of Trustees proclaimed a 17.12 km^{2} (6.61 sq mi) area for the zebra's preservation in 1938 after the purchase of the farm Babylons Toren, Cradock the year before. The mountain zebra population of the park comprised only five stallions and one mare and was insufficient to expand the population. By 1950 only two stallions remained, and a neighbouring farmer, Mr H L Lombard, improved the breeding pool by donating eleven zebra to the park, five stallions and six mares.

By 1964, there were only 25 zebra in the park. At this time, the park's size was increased to 65.36 km^{2} (25.24 sq mi) and Paul Michau donated six zebra to the park. From then on, the number of zebras increased steadily to about 140. In 1975, the zebras were re-introduced to the Western Cape at the De Hoop Nature Reserve.

Since 1978, capture and relocation of mountain zebra to new habitat have been part of the routine management of the park. Currently (2015) the park's herd has over 700 animals, and an average of about 20 animals are relocated each year. Through the years, additional farms have been purchased to increase the size of the park to the current 284 km^{2} (110 sq mi).

== Fauna ==
Besides the Cape mountain zebra, other common herbivores here include springbok, black wildebeest, red hartebeest, common eland, blesbok, mountain reedbuck, gray rhebok, greater kudu, steenbok, and klipspringer. Cape buffalo were reintroduced in 1998. Gemsbok and south-western black rhino were reintroduced in 2002.

Among carnivores, caracals were the primary carnivore found here, until reintroductions began for larger carnivores. Southeast African cheetah were reintroduced in 2007. Brown hyenas were reintroduced in 2008, and in 2013, three lions were reintroduced. All three species are successfully breeding in the park.

=== Mammals ===
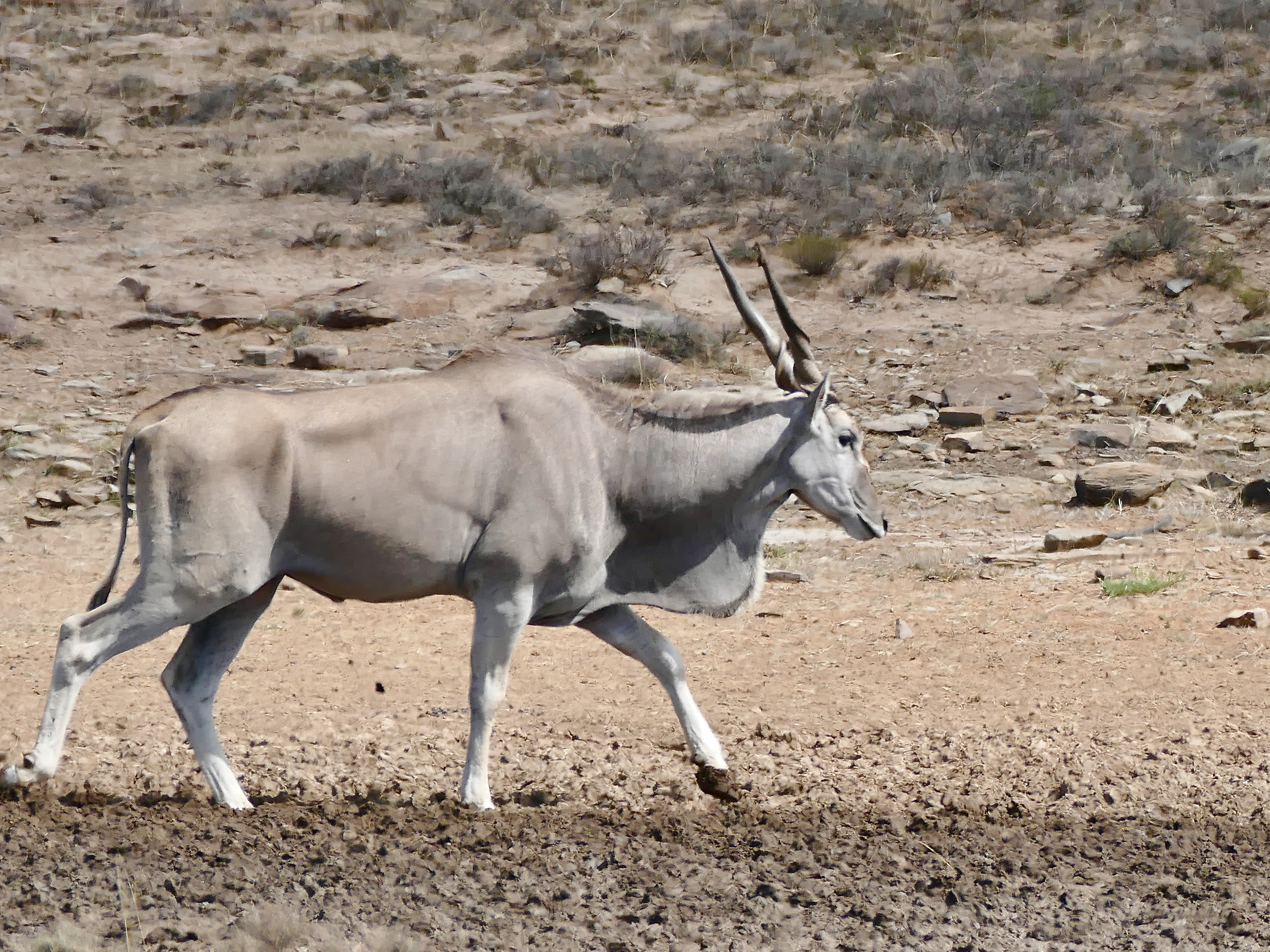
Eland

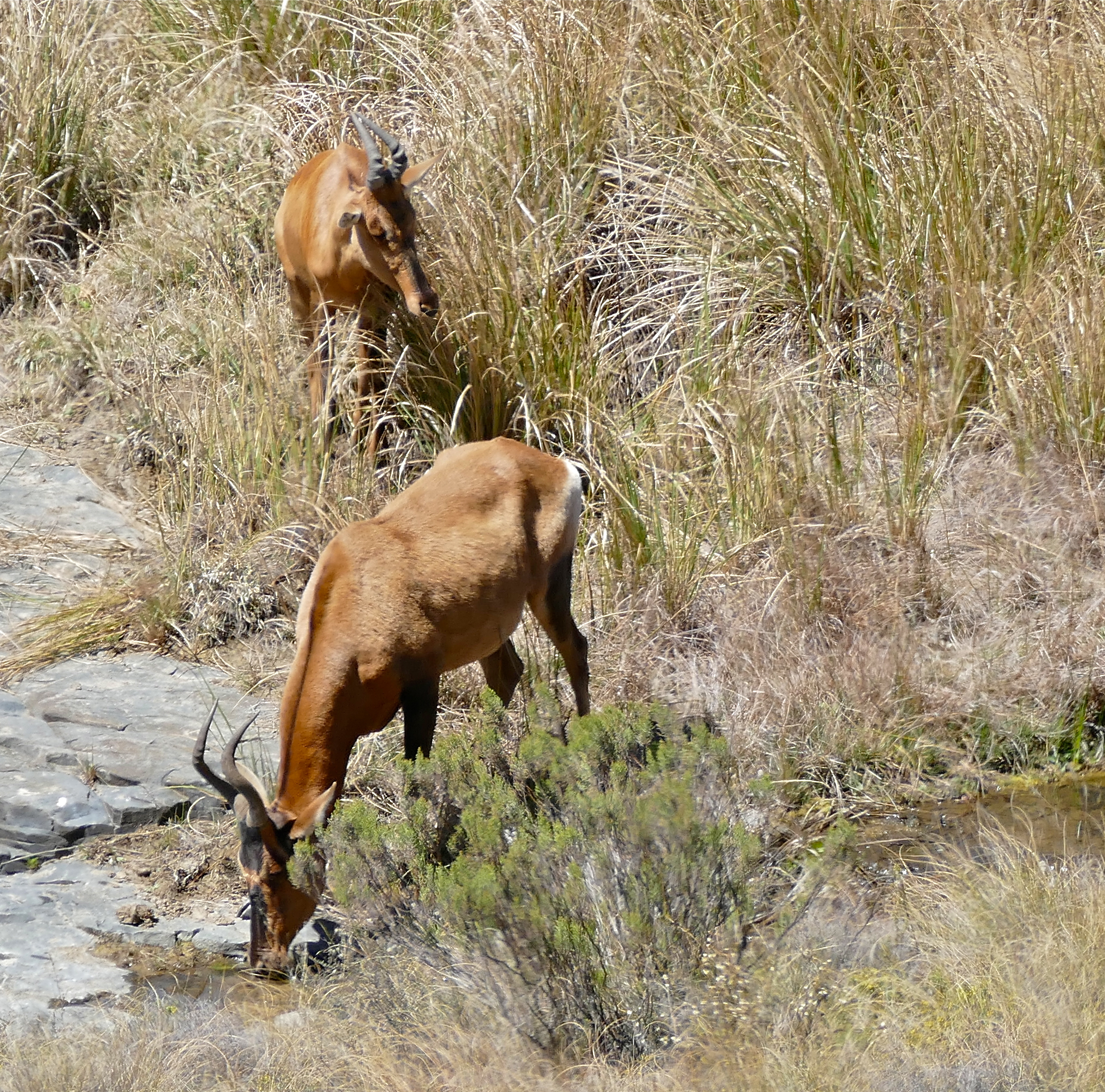
Red hartebeest

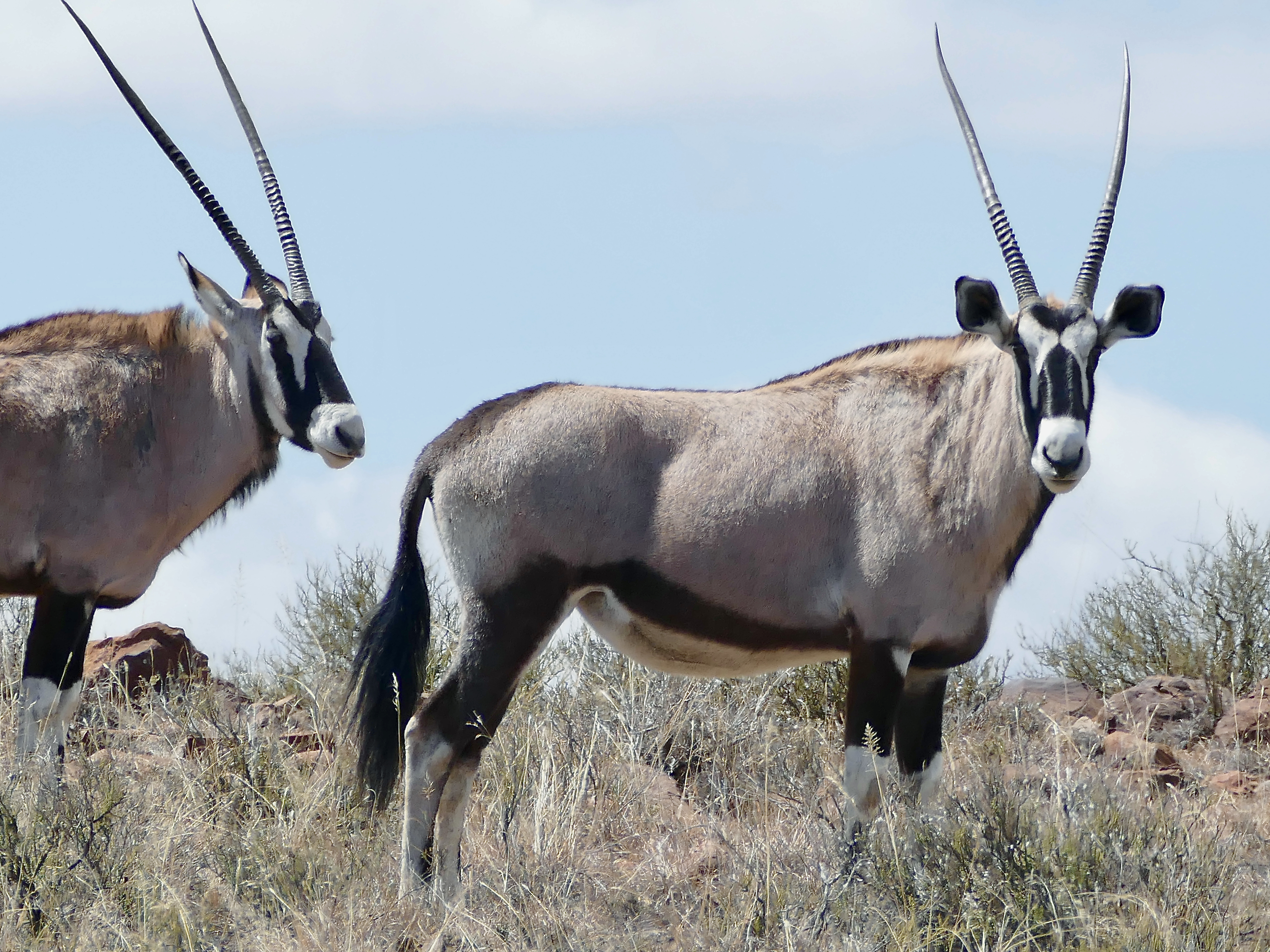
Gemsbok

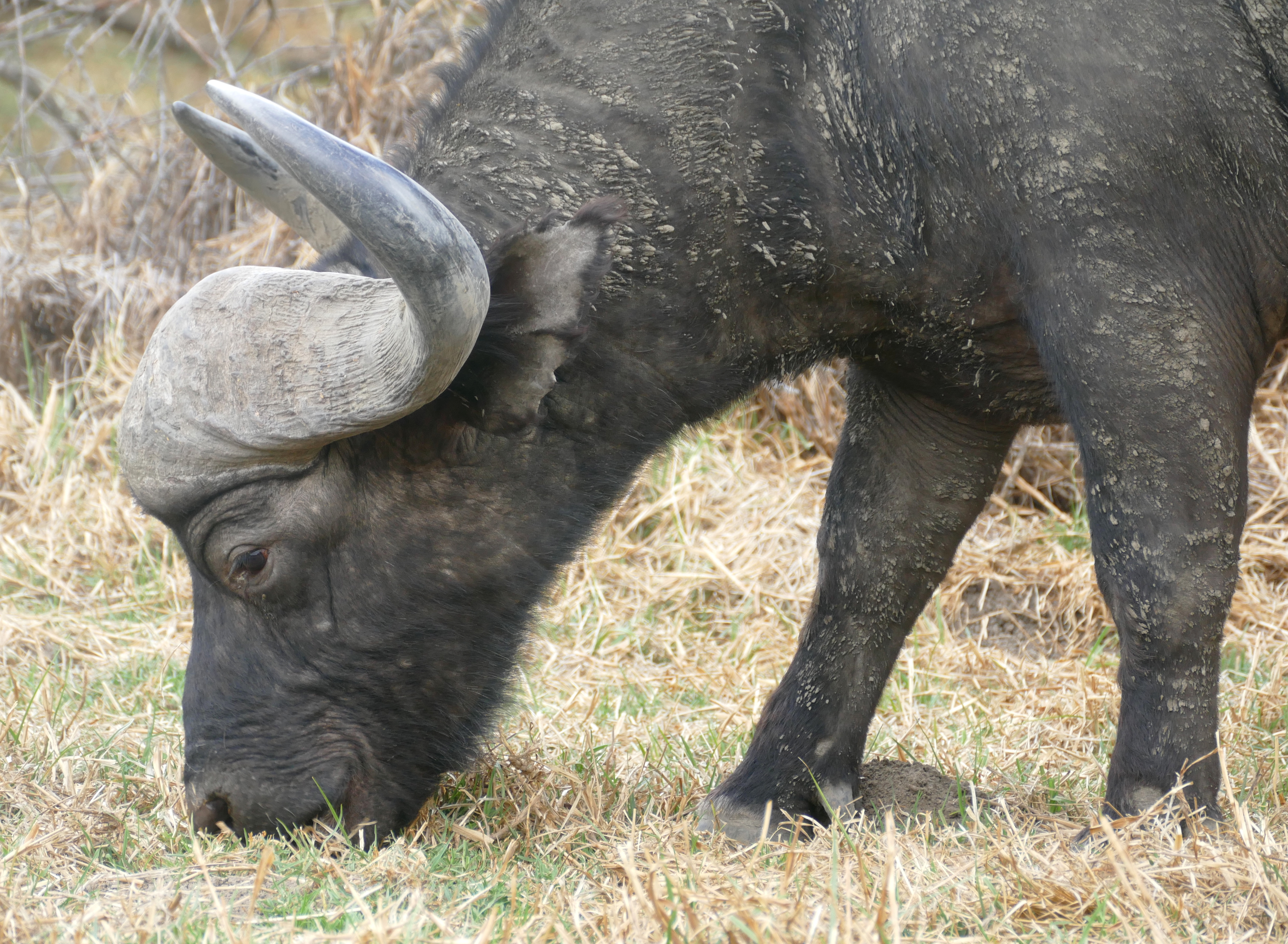
Cape buffalo

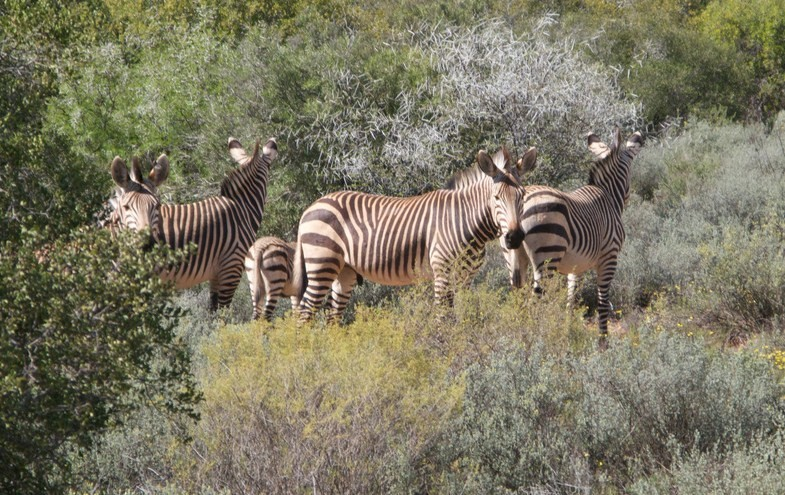
Mountain zebra harem

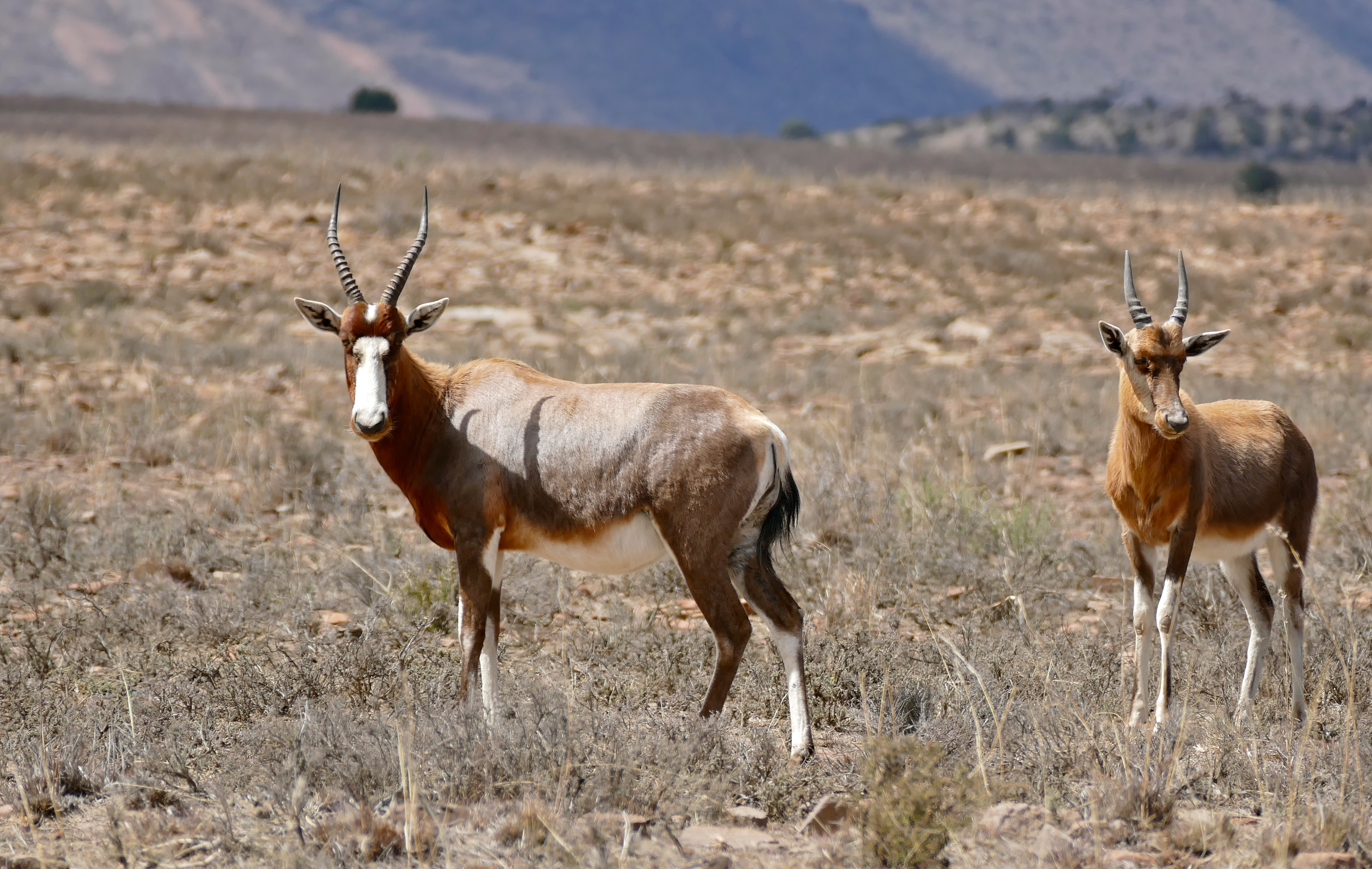
Blesboks

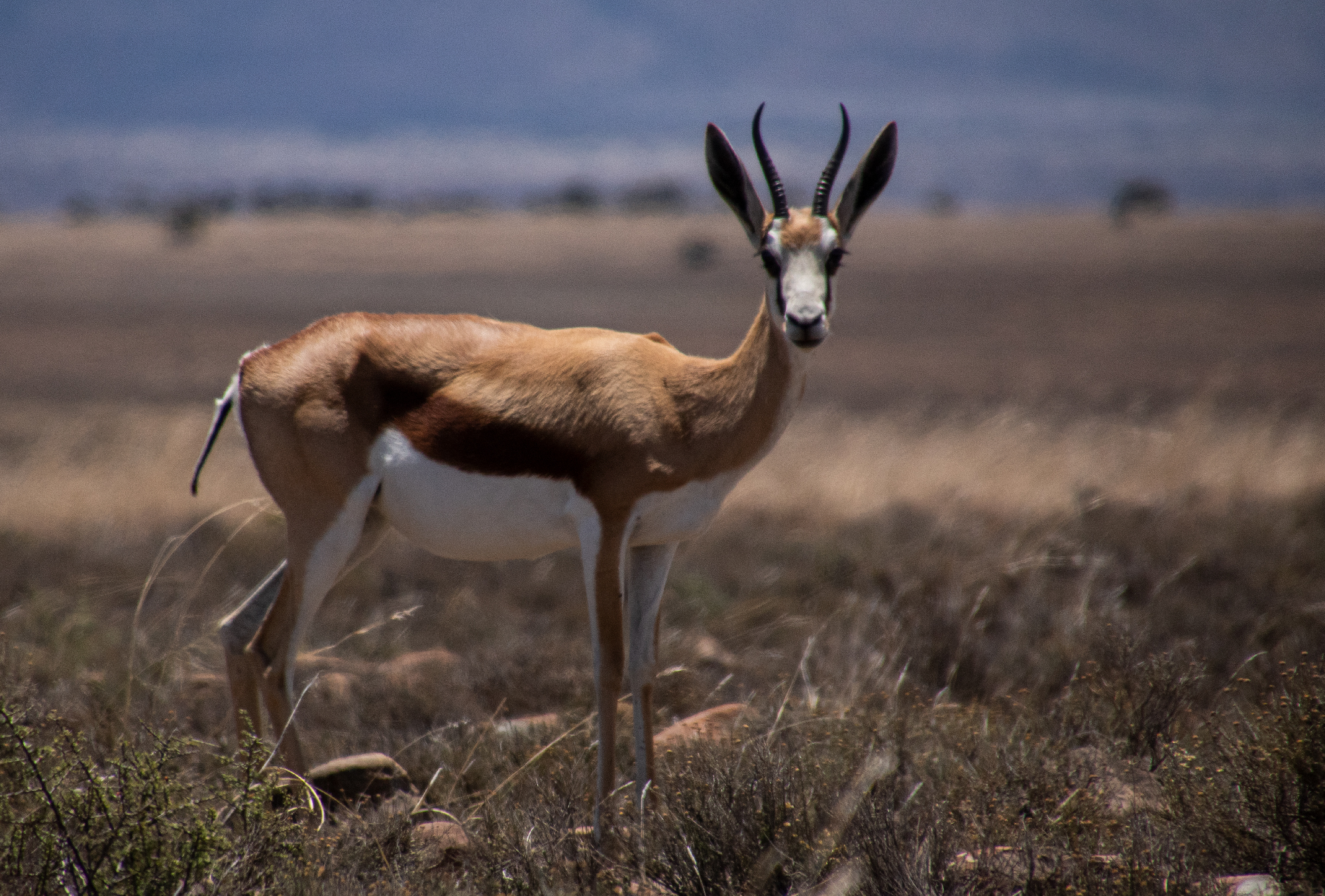
Springbok

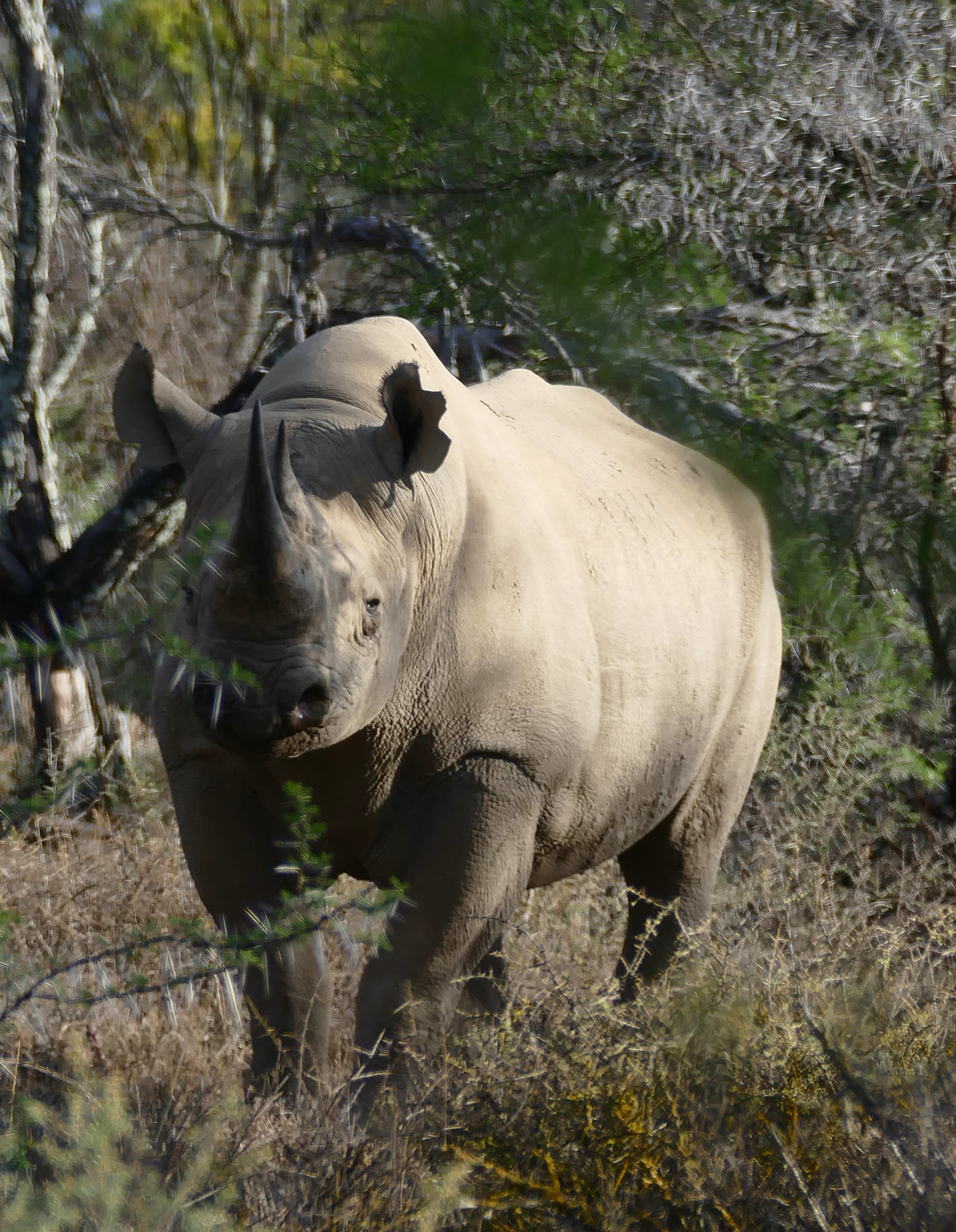
Black rhinoceros

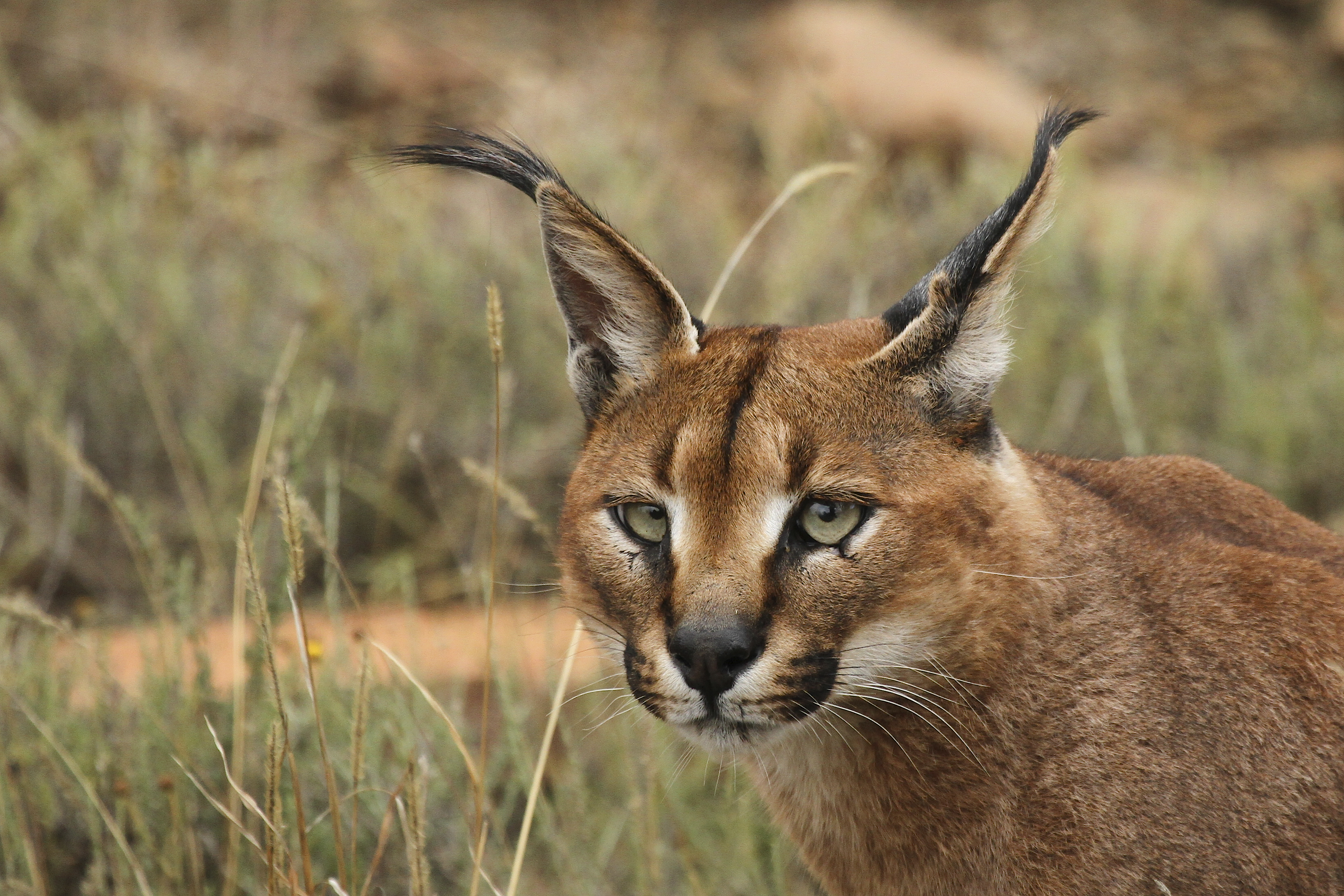
Caracal

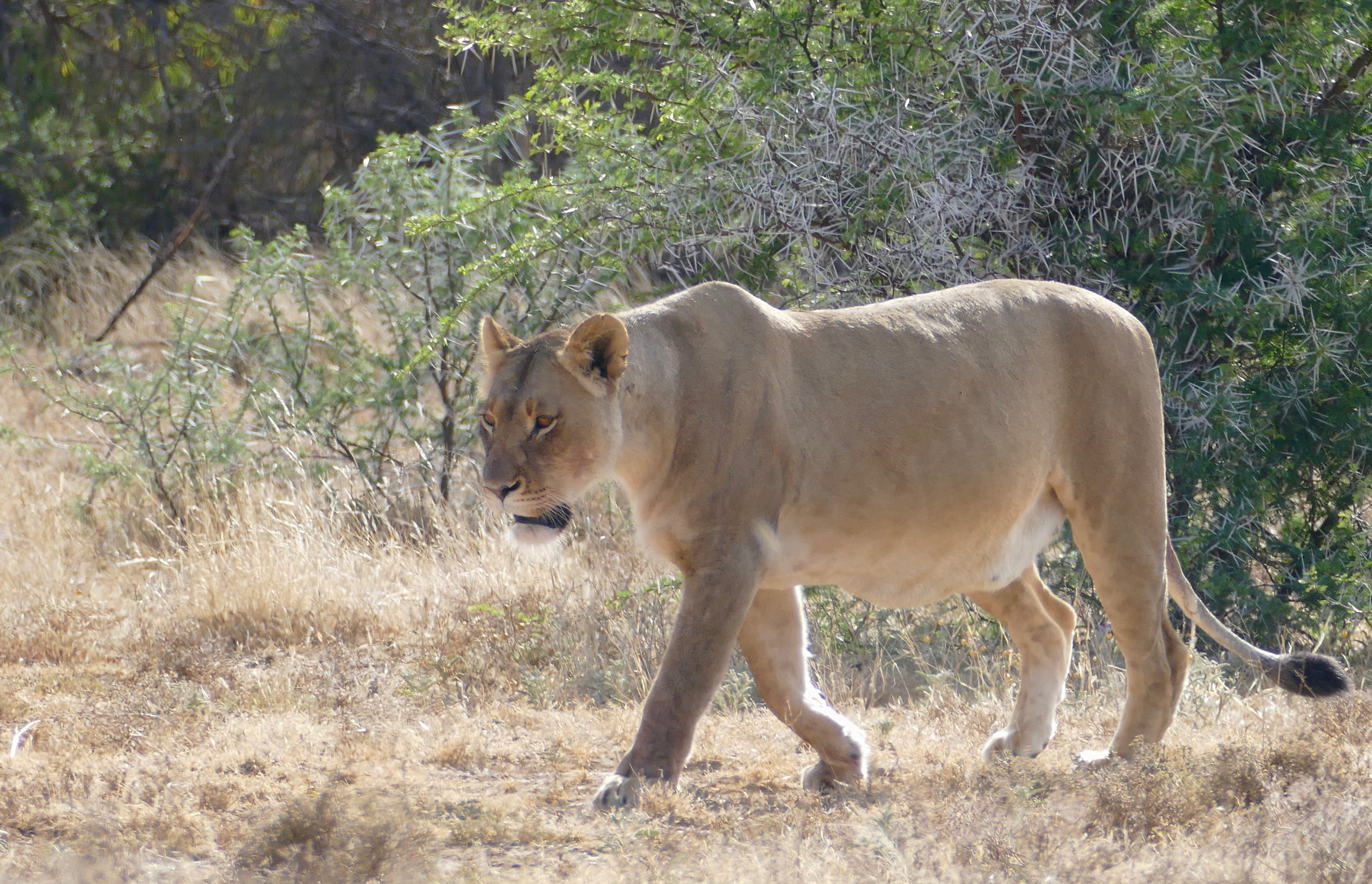
Lion

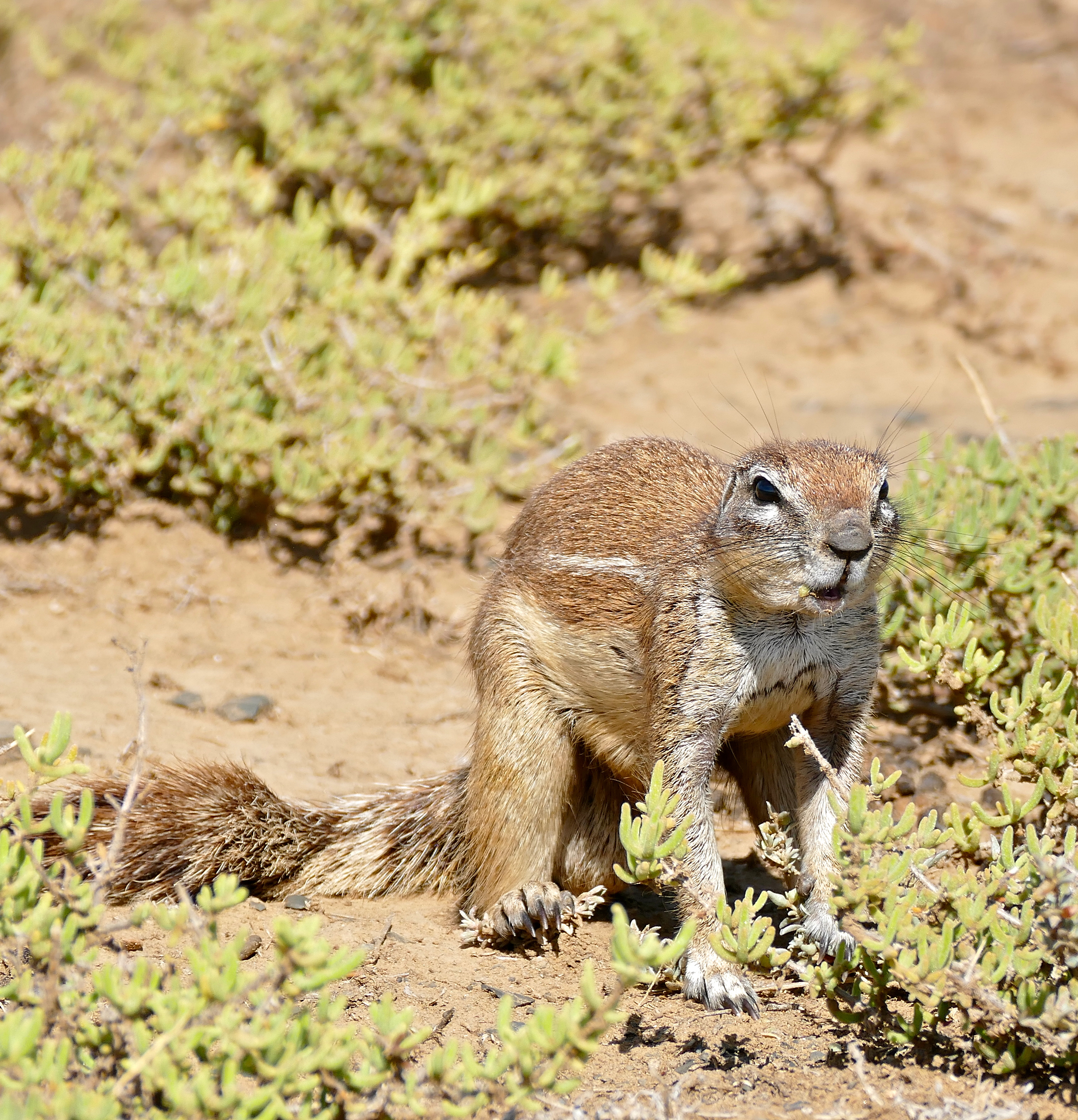
Ground squirrel

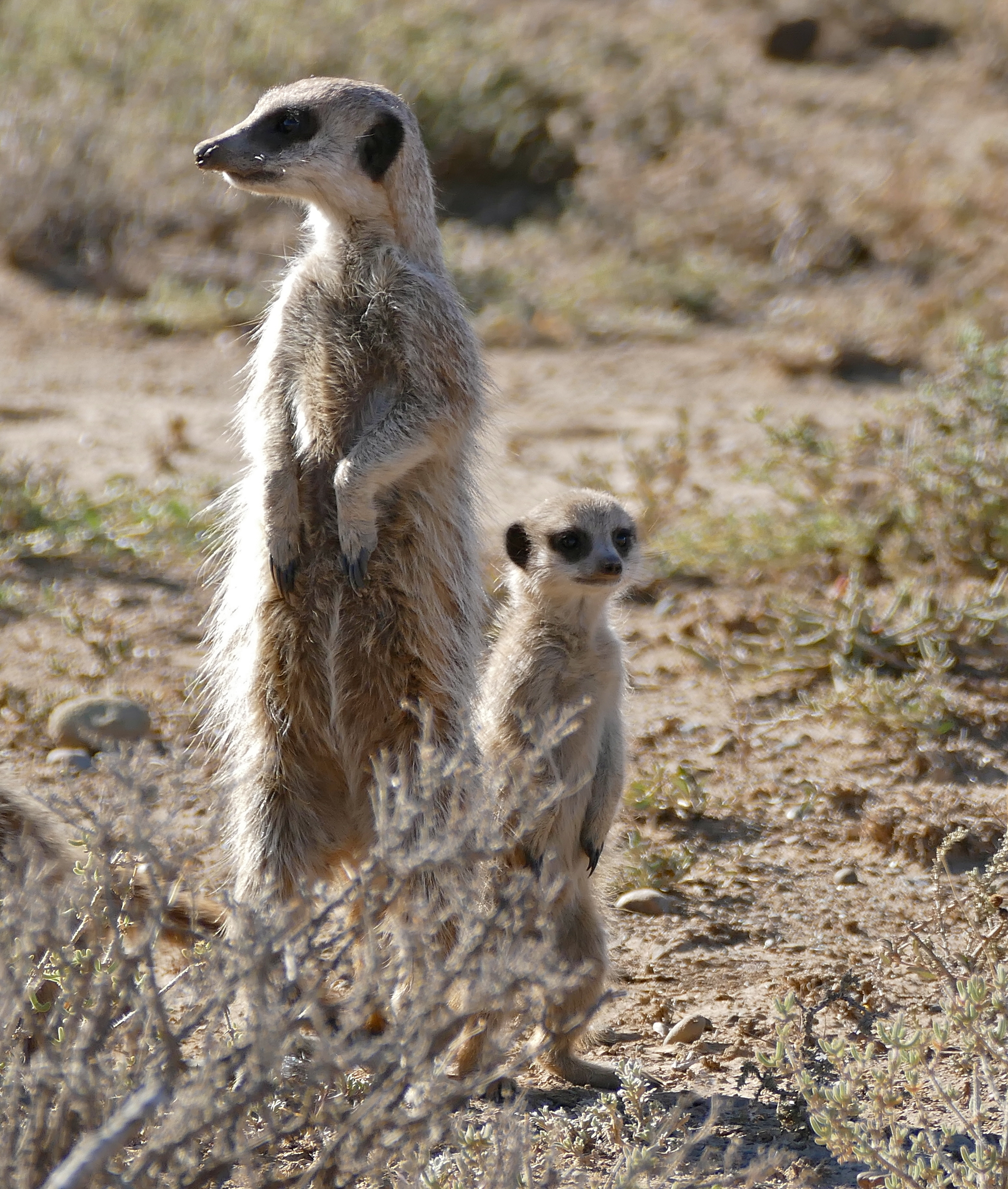
Meerkats

=== Birds ===
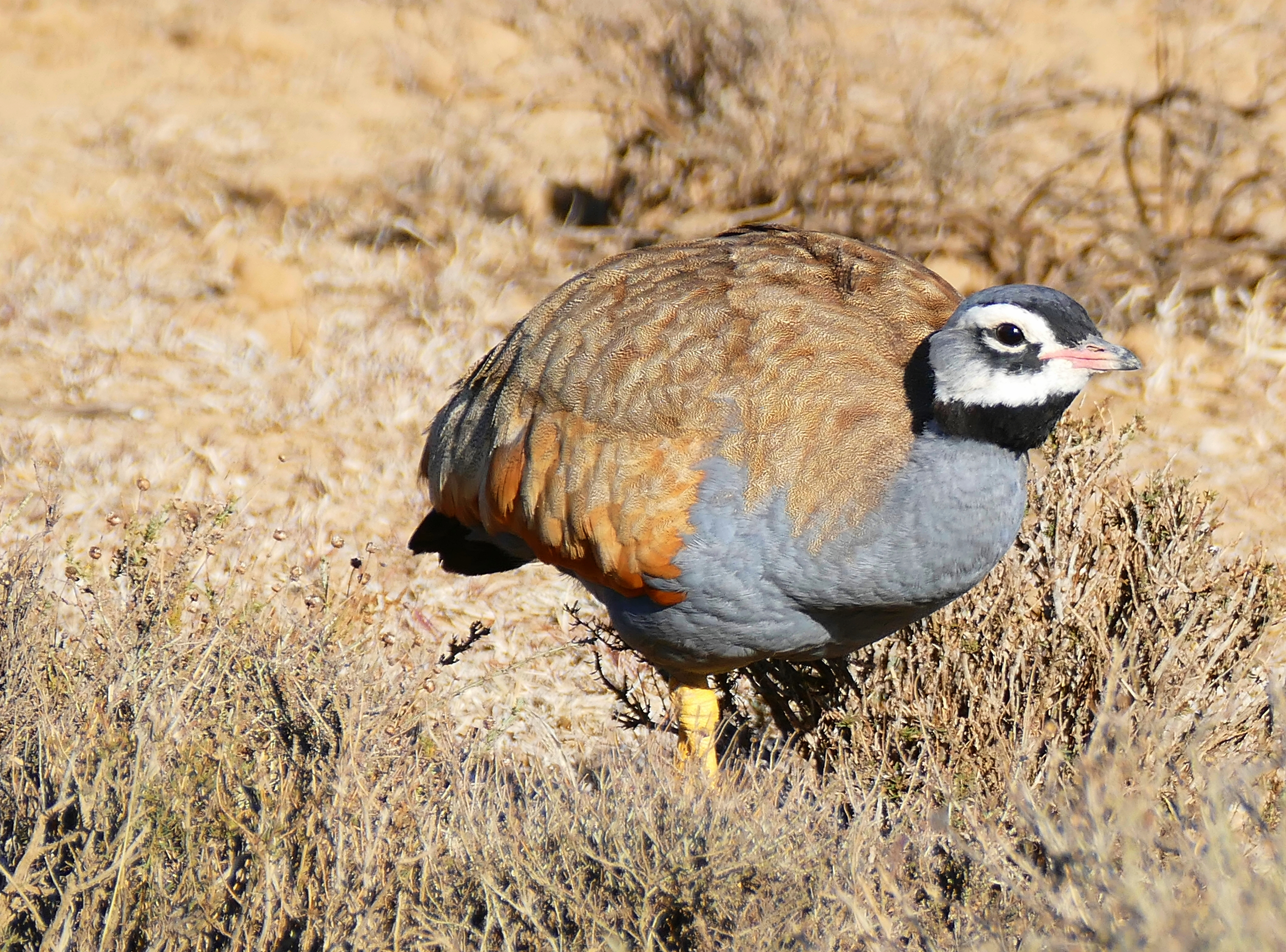
Blue korhaan

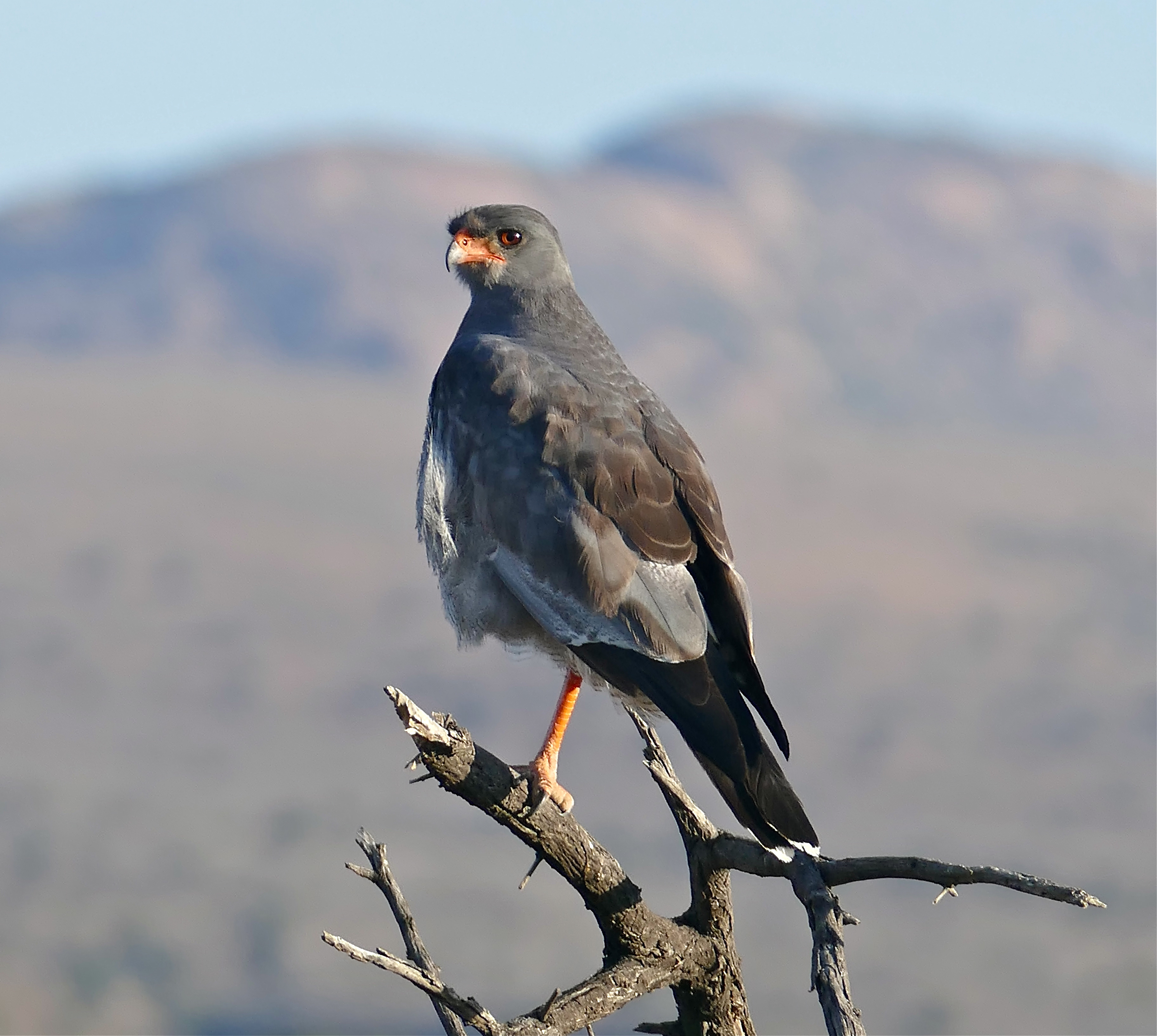
Pale chanting goshawk

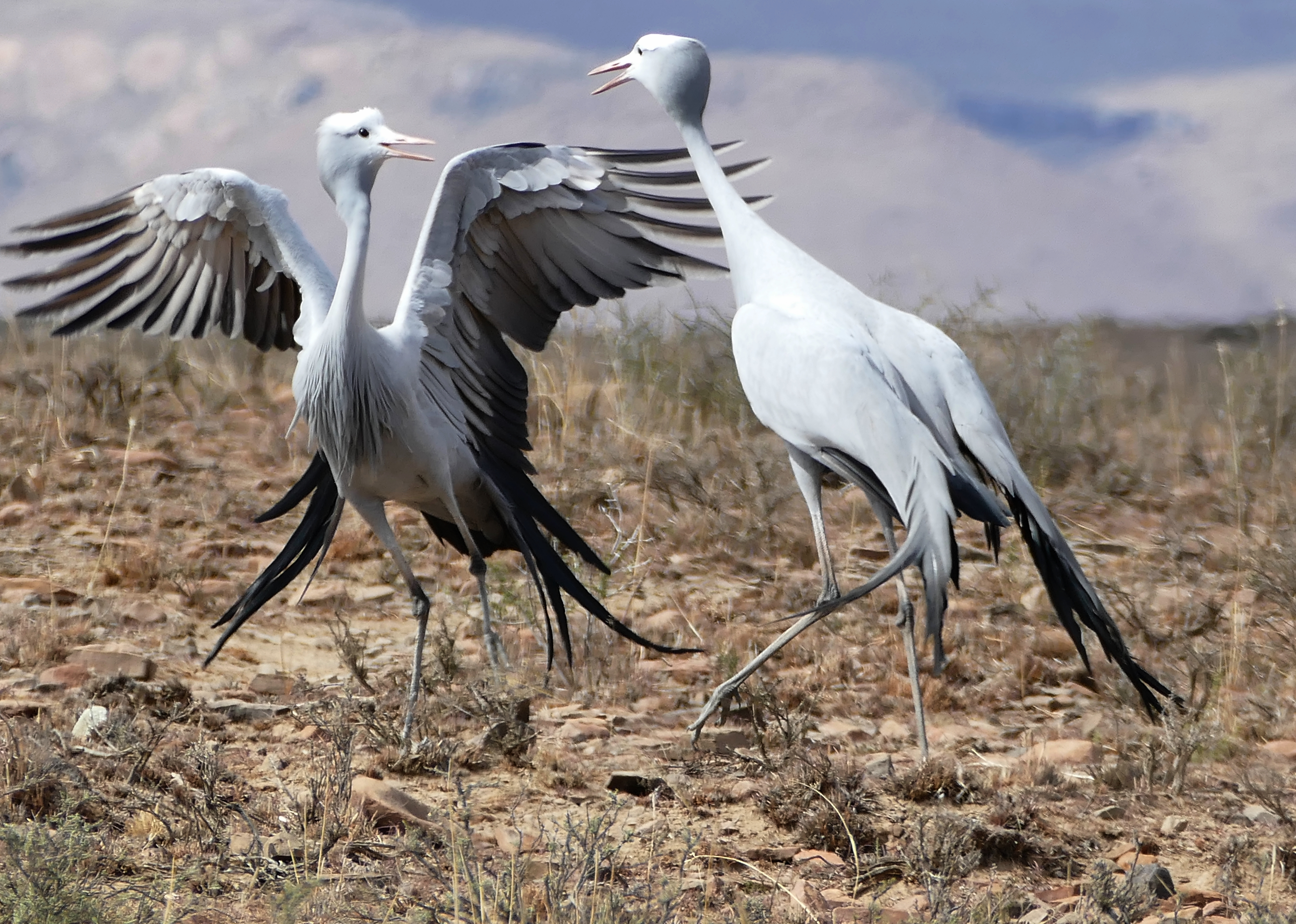
Blue crane

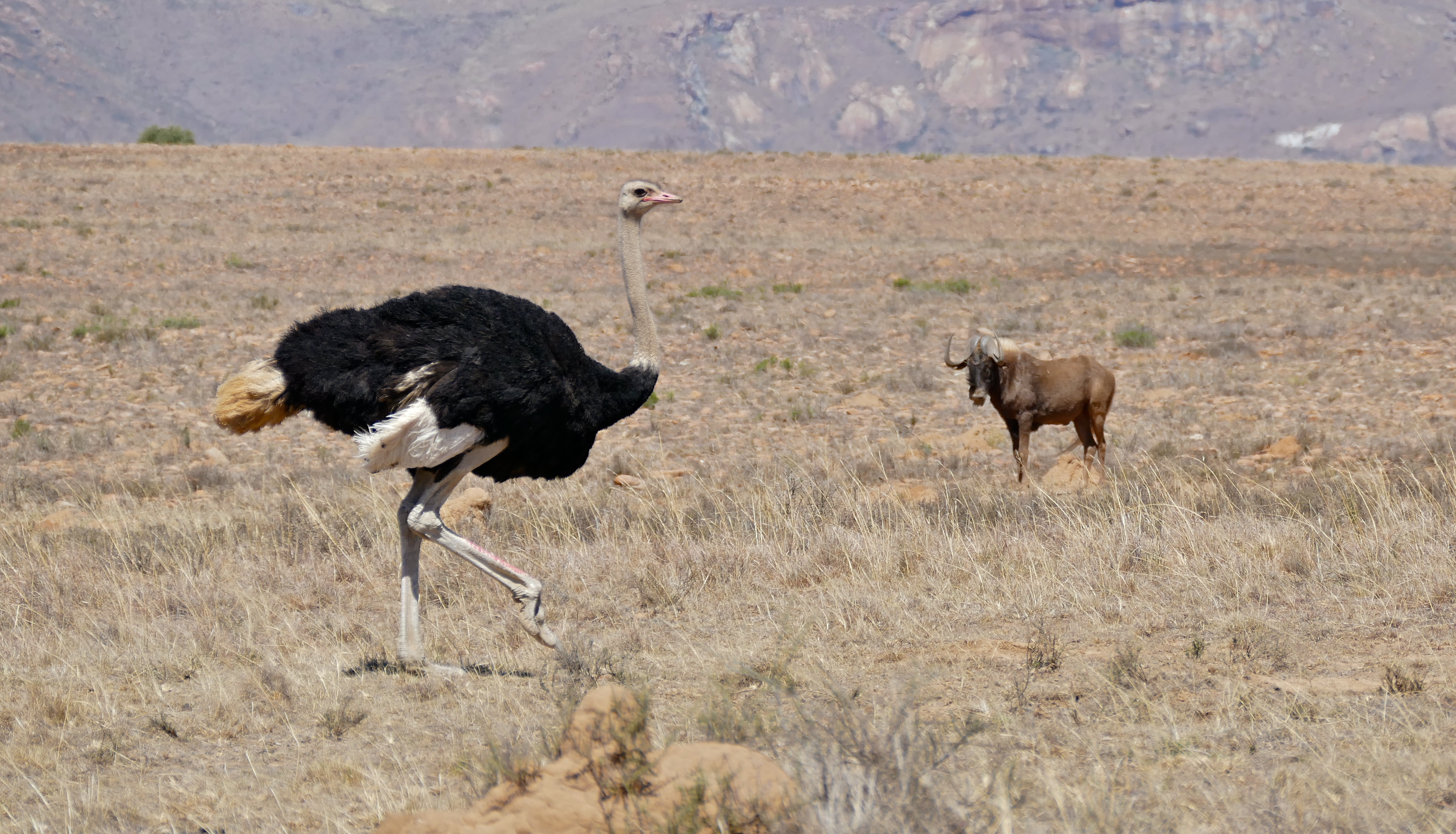
Ostrich

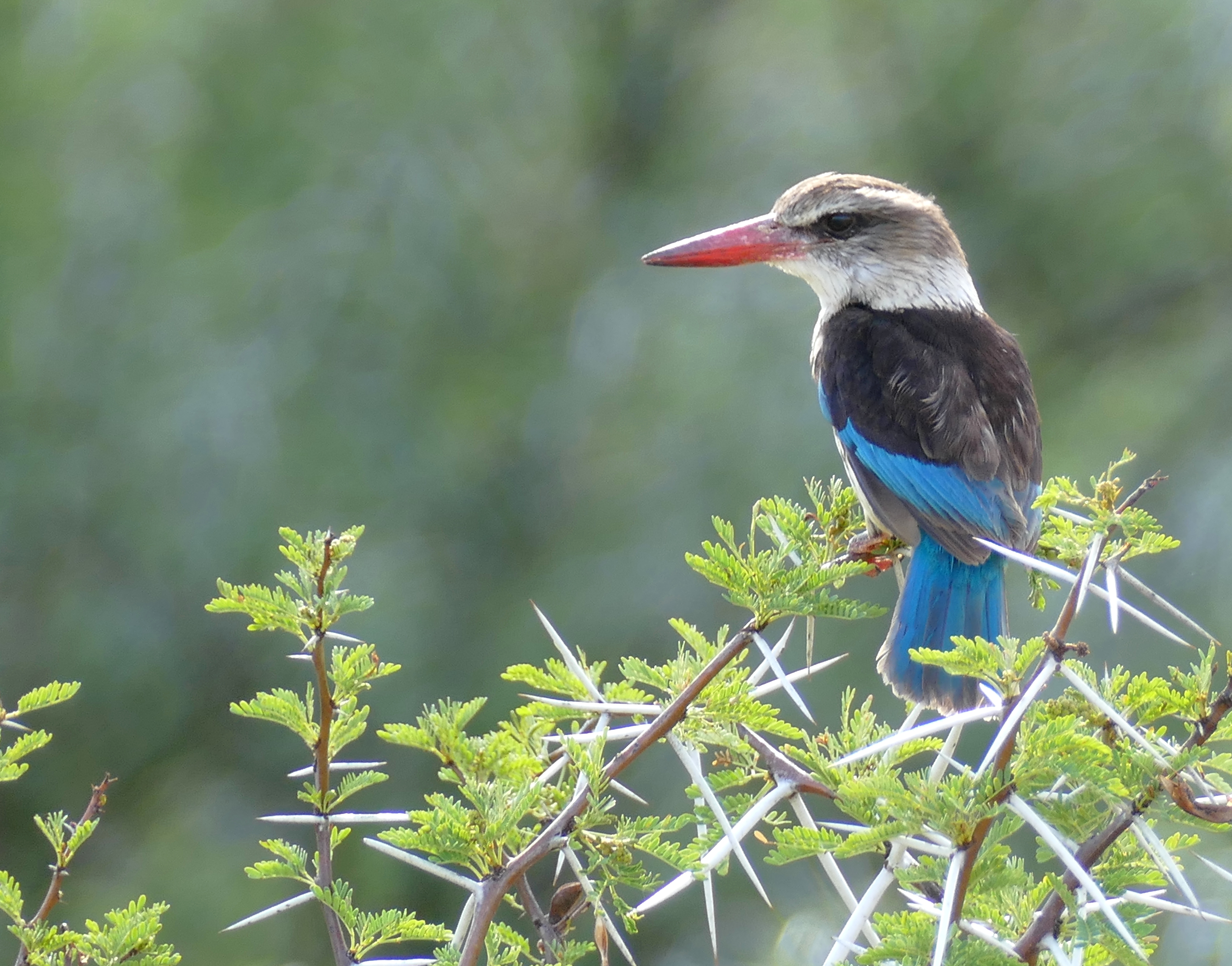
Brown-hooded kingfisher

== Flora ==
Species of trees found in the park are:

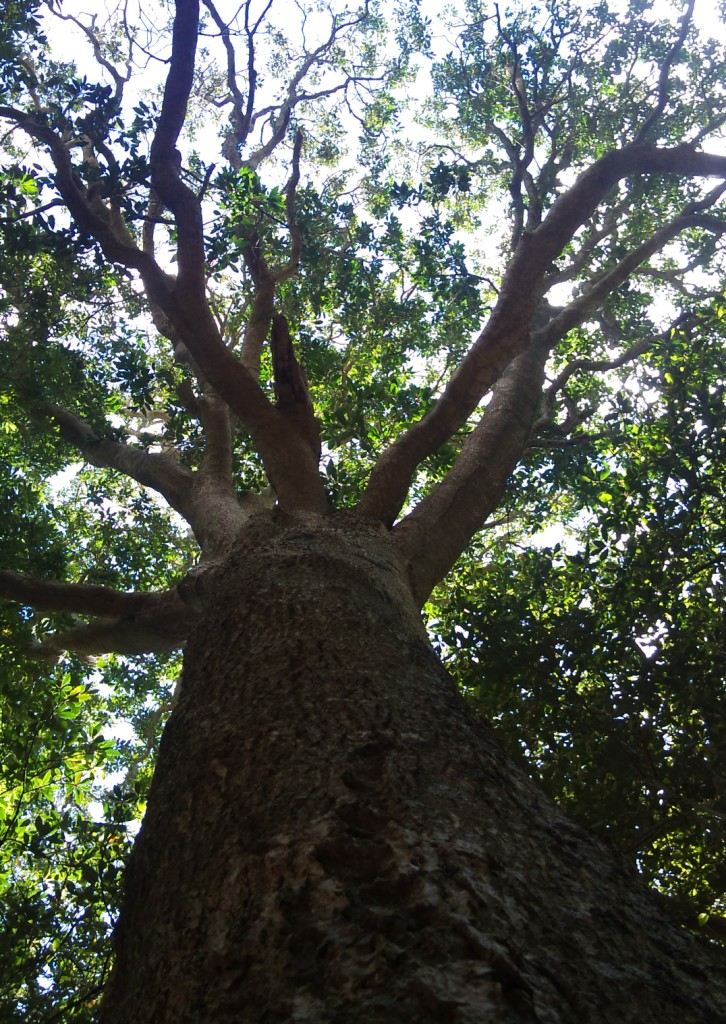
Rapanea melanophloeos (Cape beech)

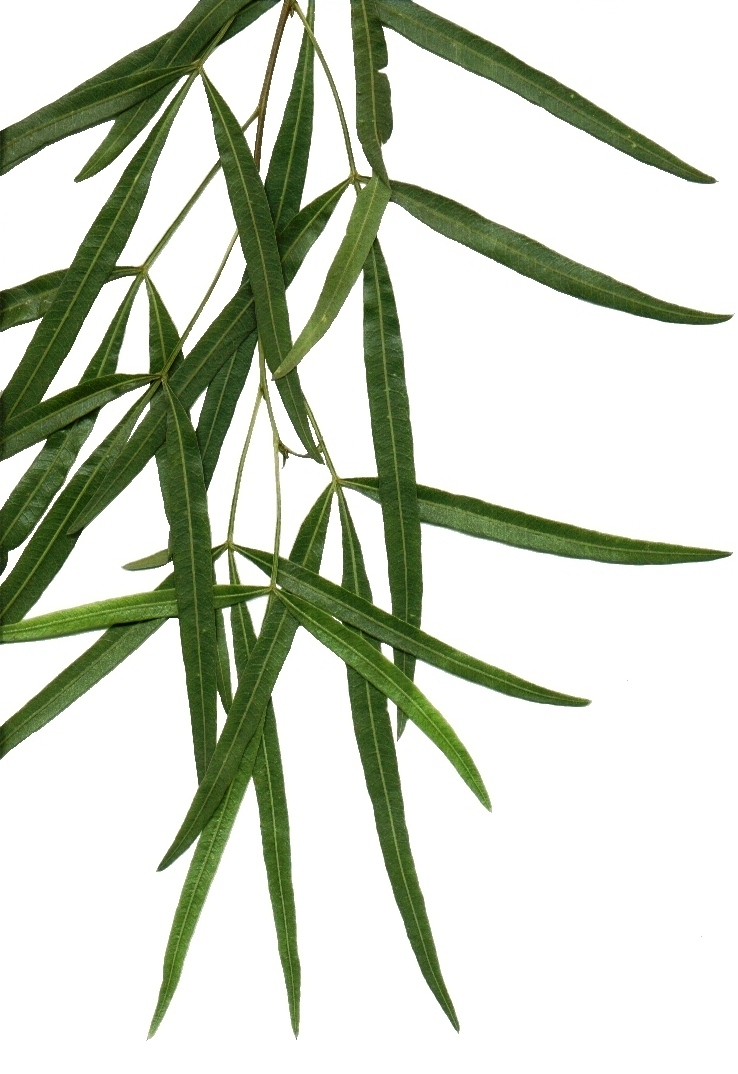
Rhus lancea ("Karee")

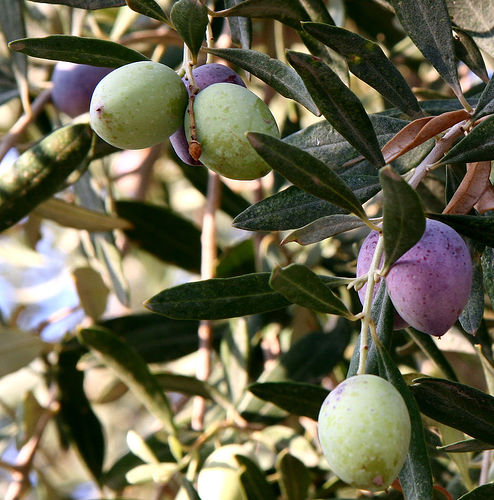
Olive

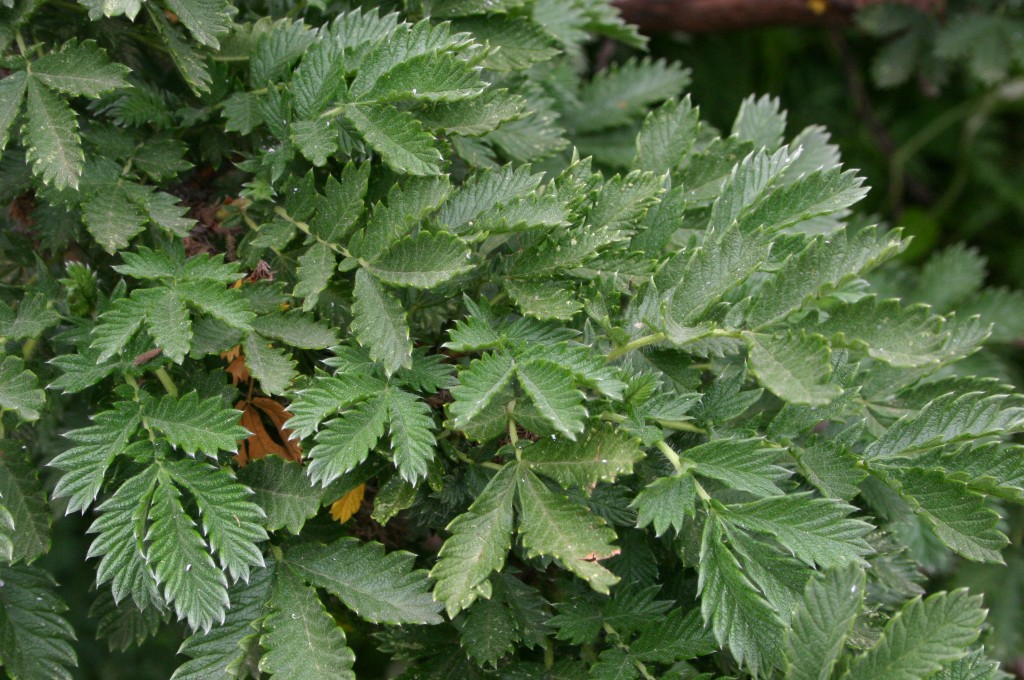
Leucosidea sericea ("Ouhout")

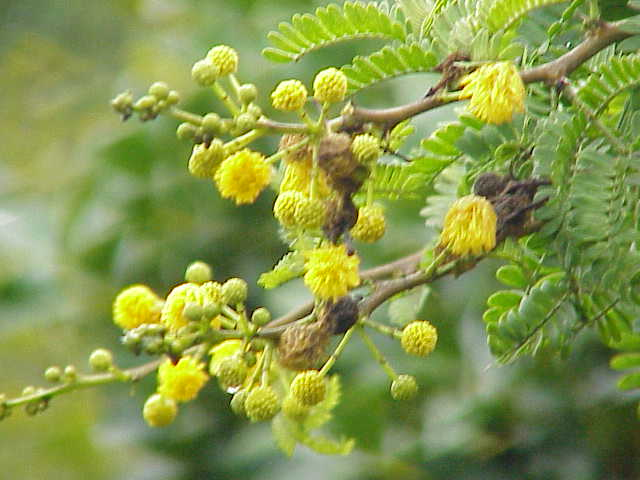
Vachellia karroo

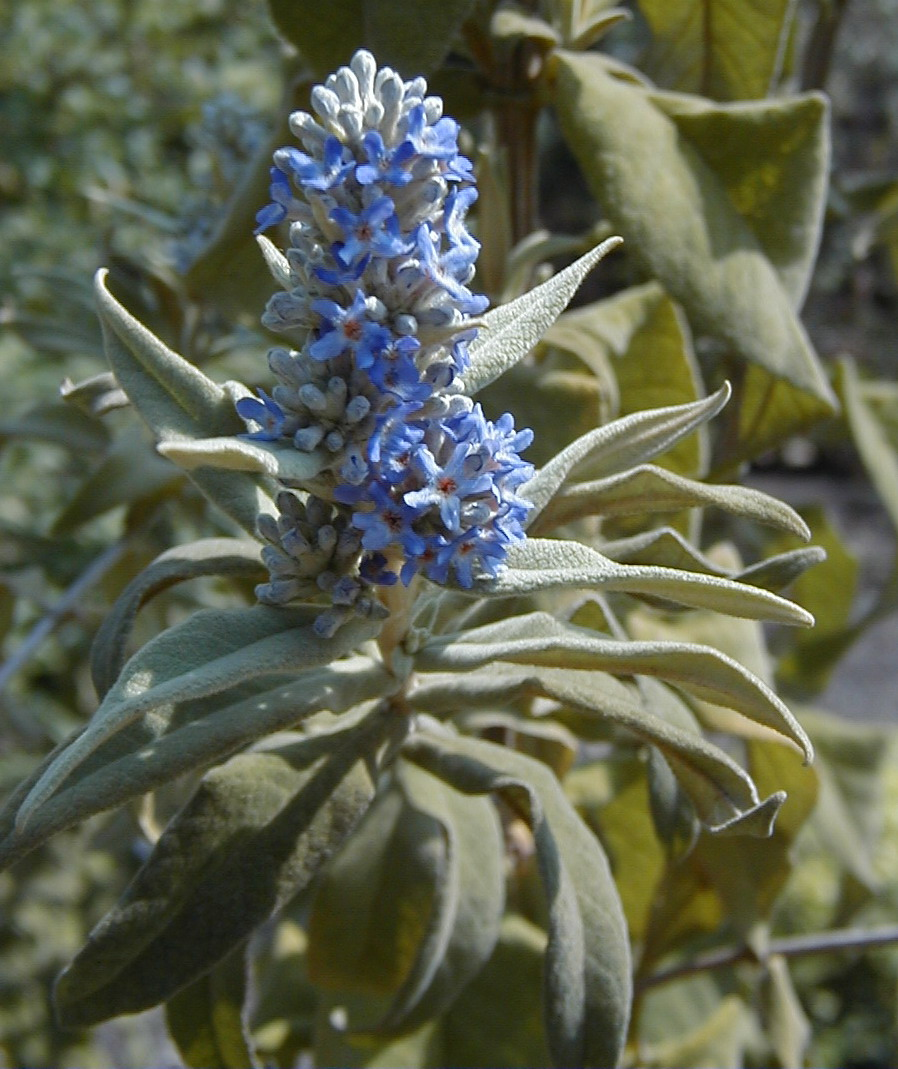
Buddleja salviifolia (sage)

== Tourism infrastructure ==
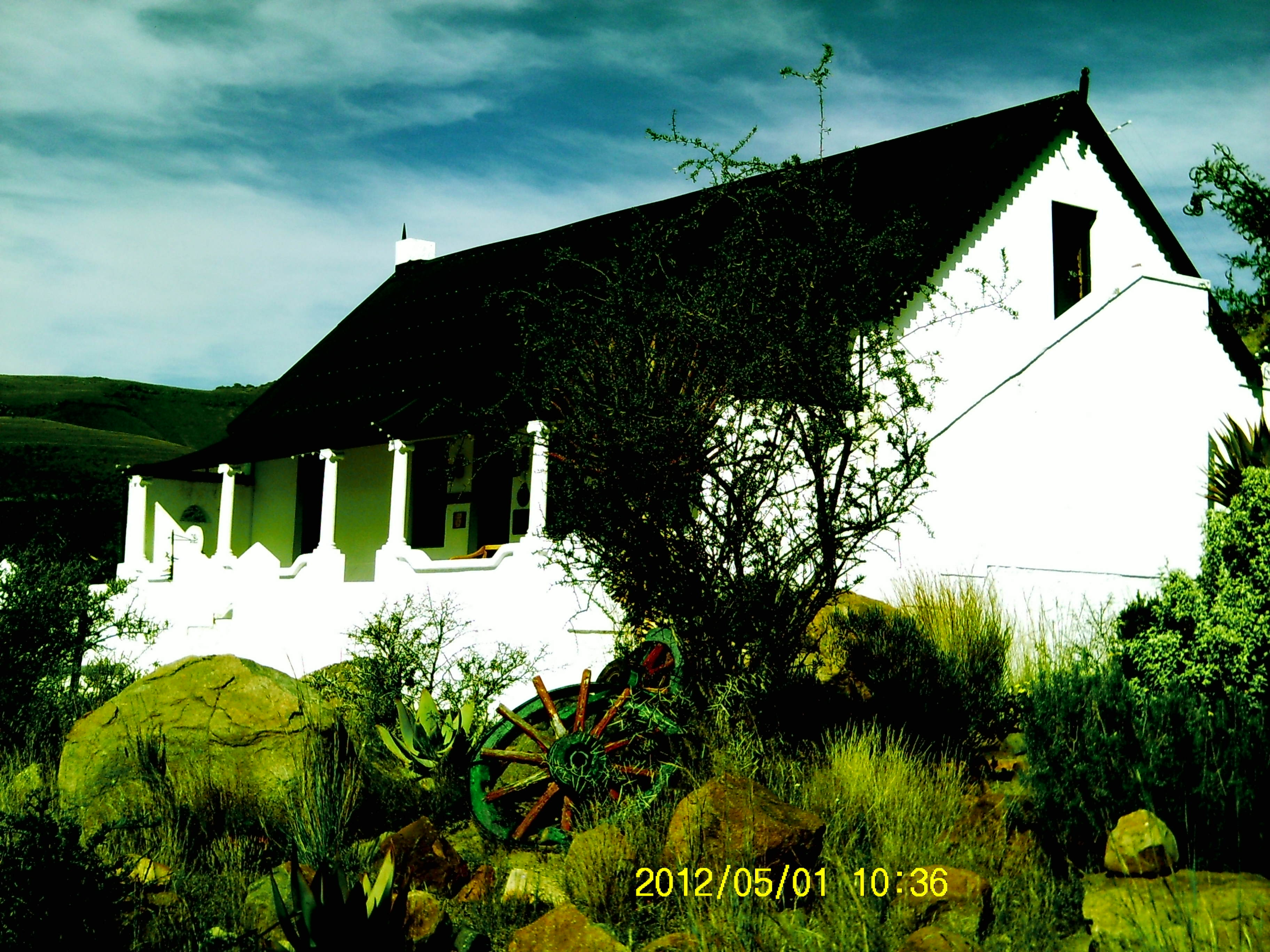
Doornhoek Guest house

- 19 Family cottages with 76 beds (each unit sleeps 4 people).
- One swimming pool (for overnight guests only).
- One camping terrain with 20 sites, each sleeping a maximum of 6 persons.
- Ablution and kitchen facilities on camp site
- One guest house sleeping 6 persons.
- Two overnight huts sleeping 10 persons each (for hiking trail) with approximately 39 km of hiking trails.

== Visitor numbers ==
From 1 April 2017 to 31 March 2018, the park received 31,210 visitors up from 27,965 in the previous year. This growth rate of 11.6% placed the park in the top five SANParks for percentage growth in visitors year-on-year.
