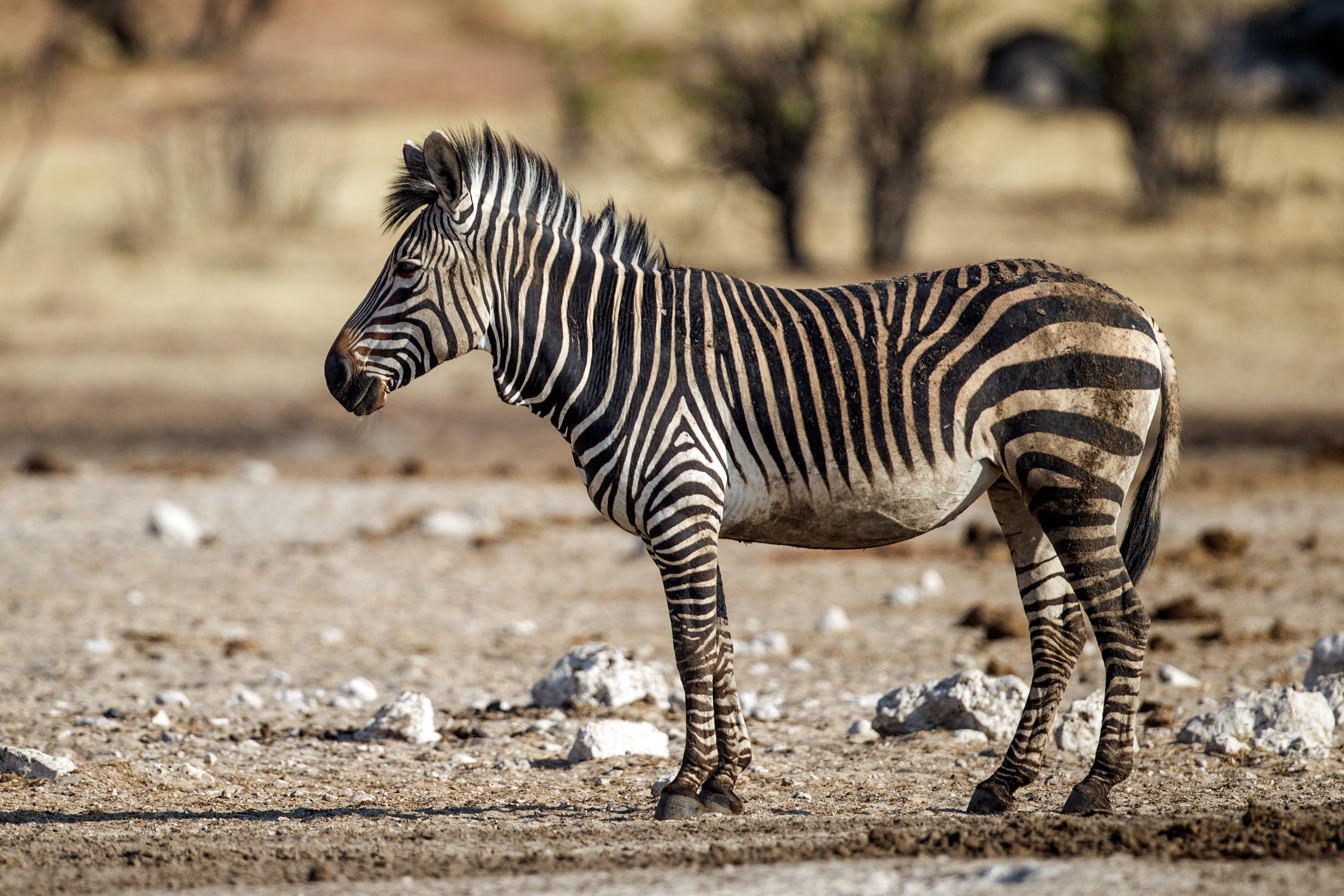
- Hartmann’s mountain zebra in Etosha National Park in Namibia

Conservation status
- Vulnerable (IUCN 3.1)
- CITES Appendix II

Scientific classification
- Kingdom: Animalia
- Phylum: Chordata
- Class: Mammalia
- Order: Perissodactyla
- Family: Equidae
- Genus: Equus
- Species: E. zebra
- Subspecies: E. z. hartmannae

Trinomial name
- Equus zebra hartmannae (Matschie, 1898)
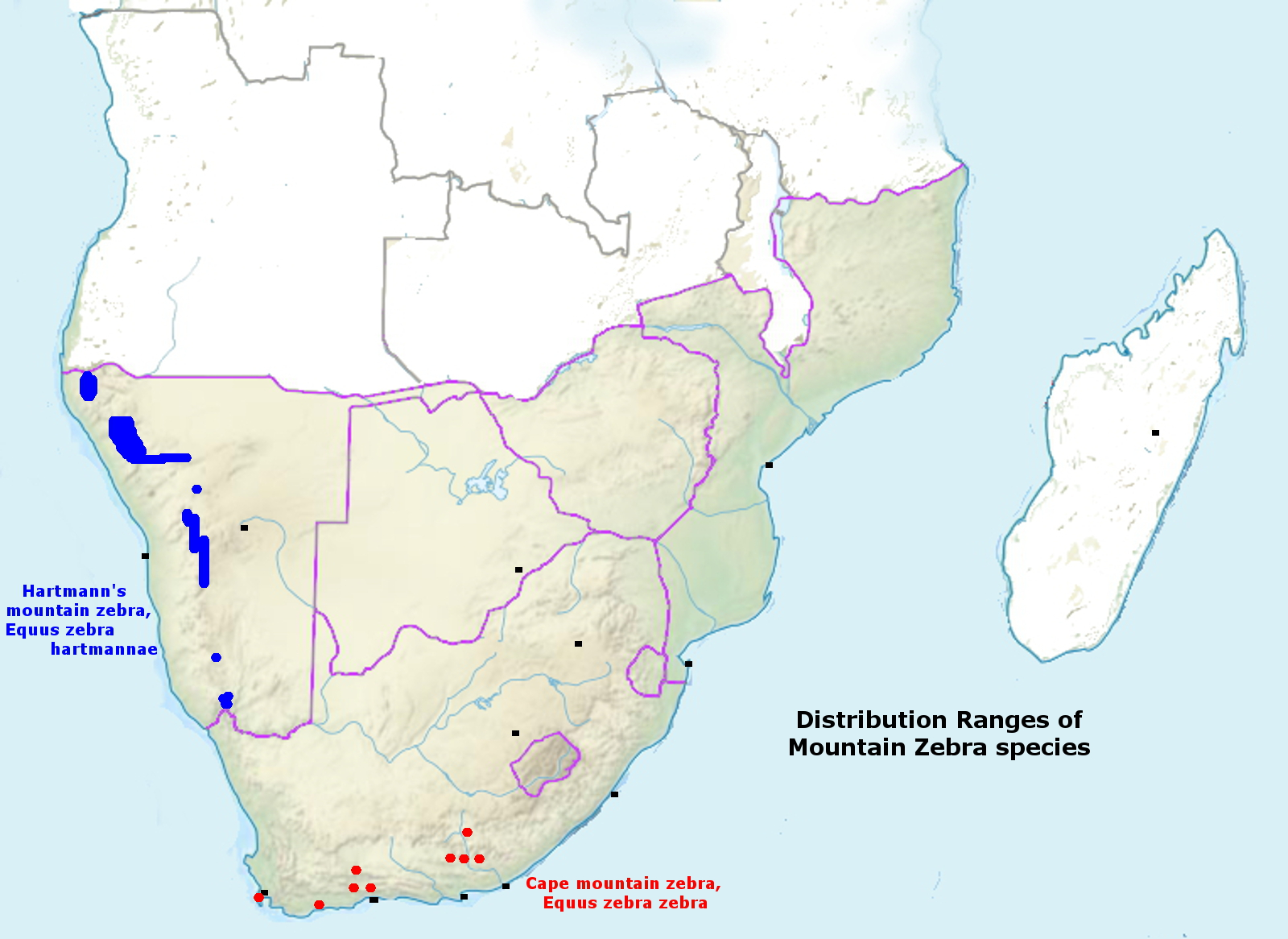
- Range map of Equus zebra hartmannae and Equus zebra zebra

= Hartmann's mountain zebra =

Subspecies of zebra

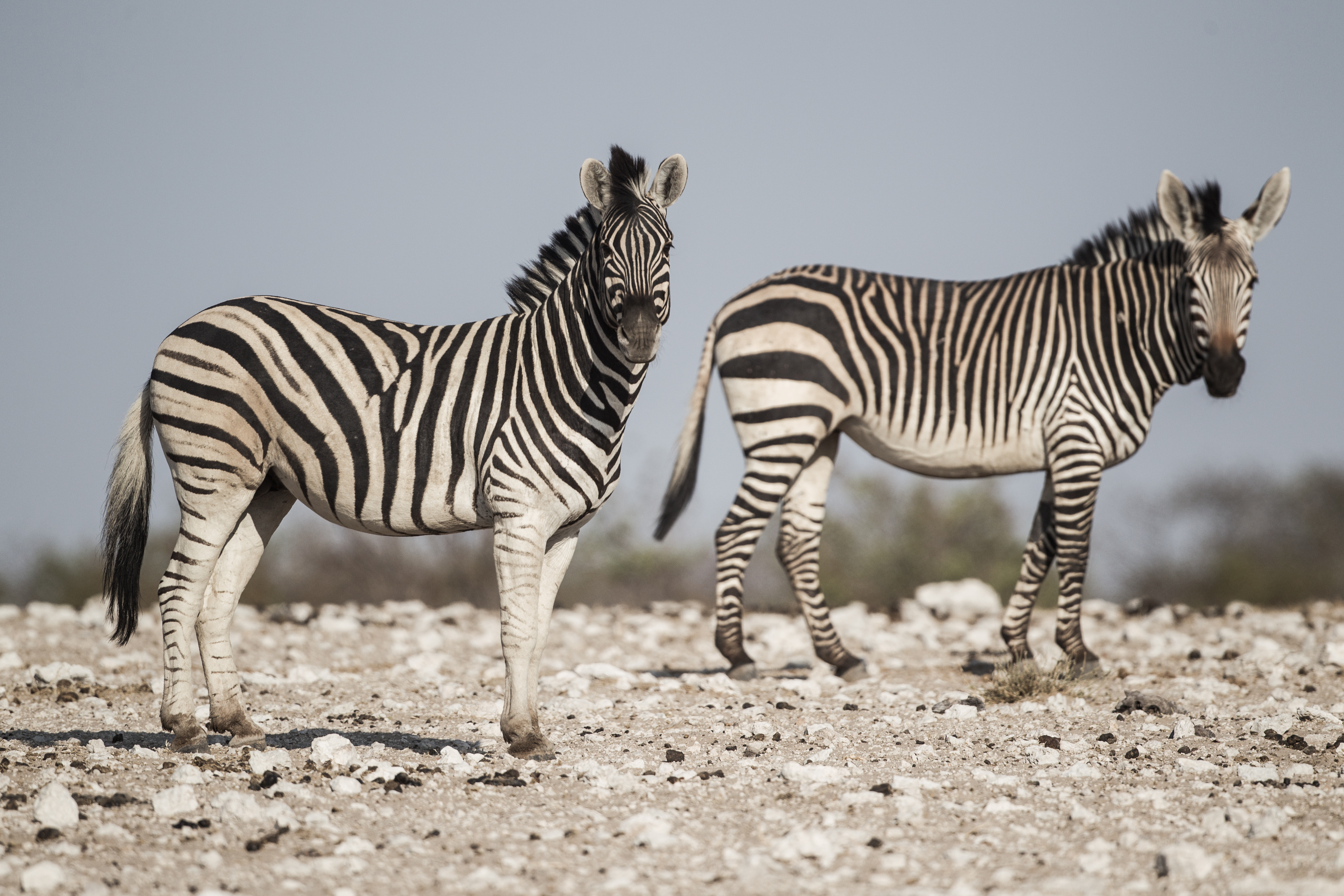
A mountain zebra (right) with a Burchell's zebra

Hartmann's mountain zebra (Equus zebra hartmannae) is a subspecies of the mountain zebra found in far south-western Angola and western Namibia, easily distinguished from other similar zebra species by its dewlap as well as the lack of stripes on its belly.

== Habitat and behaviour ==
They are agile climbers and are able to live in arid conditions and steep mountainous country.

Hartmann's mountain zebras prefer to live in small groups ranging from as little as 3 individuals to as many as 12. Herds will either be a breeding herd comprising one stallion and potentially many mares or it will be a bachelor group that consists primarily of young males. Young males raised as foals within the breeding herds will generally be kicked out when they are as young as 24 months, whereafter they may become the stallions of their own breeding herds within 5 years. When two breeding herds come into contact with one another, each respective stallion will engage the other in an elaborate posturing ritual.

Hartmann's mountain zebra has been described as an ecosystem engineer—while engaging in their unique dust bathing behavior they create a persistent depression known as a rolling pit. Even after the zebra abandons a rolling pit, they will generally remain visible for many years. These rolling pits appear to provide a favorable microsite for the native vegetation—ultimately leading to denser growth throughout the pit.

== Description ==
Hartmann's mountain zebras have a defining dewlap hanging from their throat and they are striped all the way down to their hooves with white bellies, whereas some other similar looking mountain zebra species only have stripes down to their knees and lack the completely white belly.

Hartmann's mountain zebras have a "gridiron" of narrow stripes across their back, small dewlap under the chin, and no shadow stripes. They're very good climbers compared to the other species of zebra and they have very hard and pointed hooves. They are in the horse family (Equids) and related to common zebras. Although the status of this sub-species is better than that of the Cape mountain zebra of South Africa, it is still considered vulnerable to extinction. They are managed by the International Studbook for Hartmann's mountain zebra. They are skilled climbers and have very hard and pointed hooves compared to other zebras and equids. Hartmann's mountain zebras are known for their playful demeanor compared to other zebra species.

== Taxonomy ==
It has been argued that Hartmann's mountain zebra should be considered a separate species from the Cape mountain zebra, but this is not supported by genetic evidence (see Mountain zebra#Taxonomy). Consequently, it is no longer considered a separate species in Mammal Species of the World. 2005.

A Hartmann's mountain zebra with a Barbary sheep behind it, in captivity at Ueno Zoo, Japan
