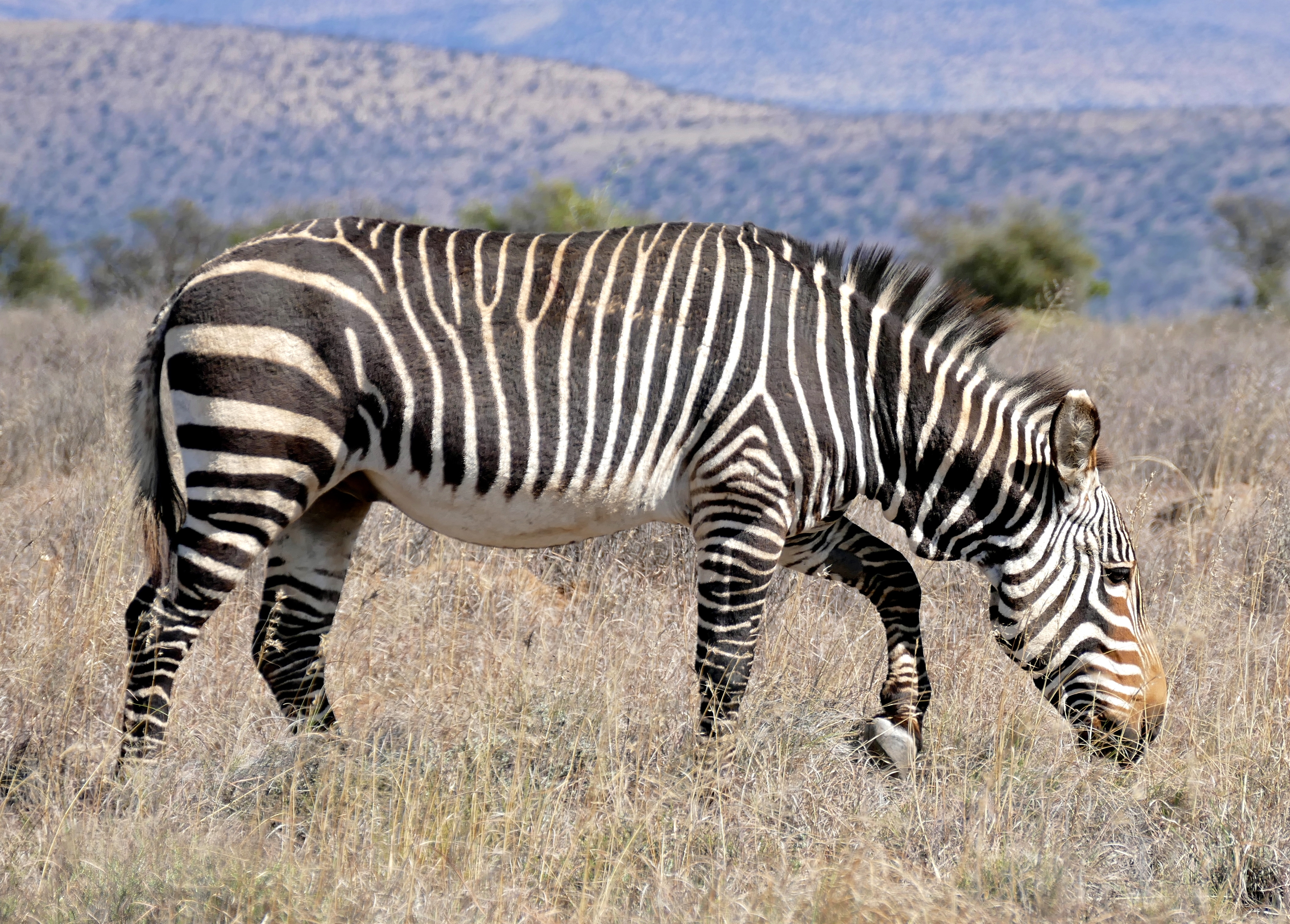

Conservation status
- Least Concern (IUCN 3.1)

Scientific classification
- Kingdom: Animalia
- Phylum: Chordata
- Class: Mammalia
- Order: Perissodactyla
- Family: Equidae
- Genus: Equus
- Species: E. zebra
- Subspecies: E. z. zebra

Trinomial name
- Equus zebra zebra Linnaeus, 1758
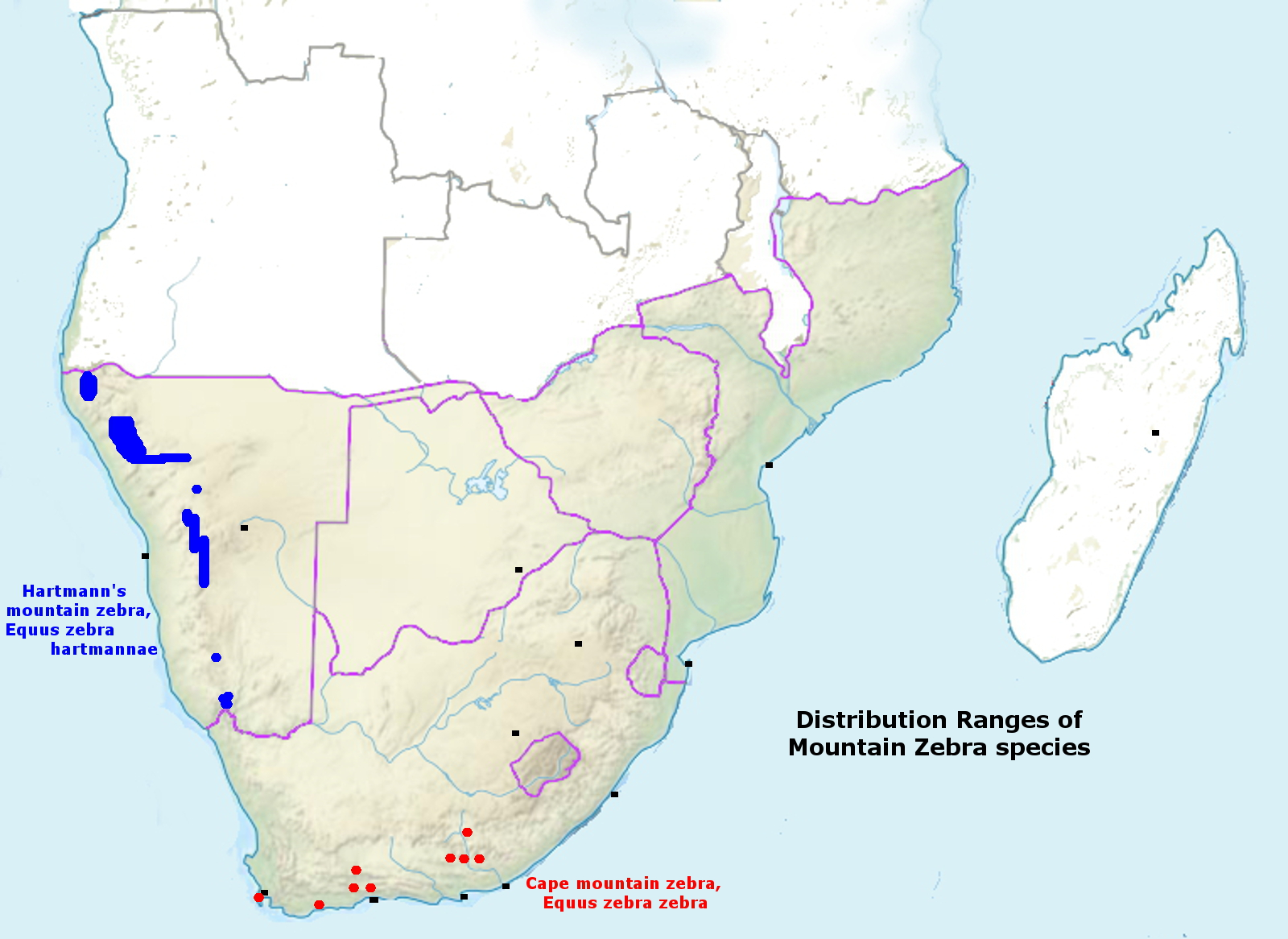
- Range map of Equus zebra zebra and Equus zebra hartmannae

= Cape mountain zebra =

Cape mountain zebra Temporal range: Pleistocene - Recent

Subspecies of zebra

The Cape mountain zebra (Equus zebra zebra) is a nominate subspecies of mountain zebra that occurs in certain mountainous regions of the Western and Eastern Cape provinces of South Africa.

It is the smallest of all existing zebra species and also the most geographically restricted. Although once nearly driven to extinction, the population has now been increased by several conservation methods, and is now classified as Least Concern by the IUCN.

== Taxonomy ==
The Cape mountain zebra is one of two geographically separated subspecies of the species Equus zebra (mountain zebra), the other being Hartmann's mountain zebra (Equus zebra hartmannae). The Cape mountain zebra was once regarded as a separate species from Hartmann's mountain zebra based on taxonomic evidence, but recent genomic evidence has led to the two populations now being reclassified as subspecies of Equus zebra.

== Appearance ==
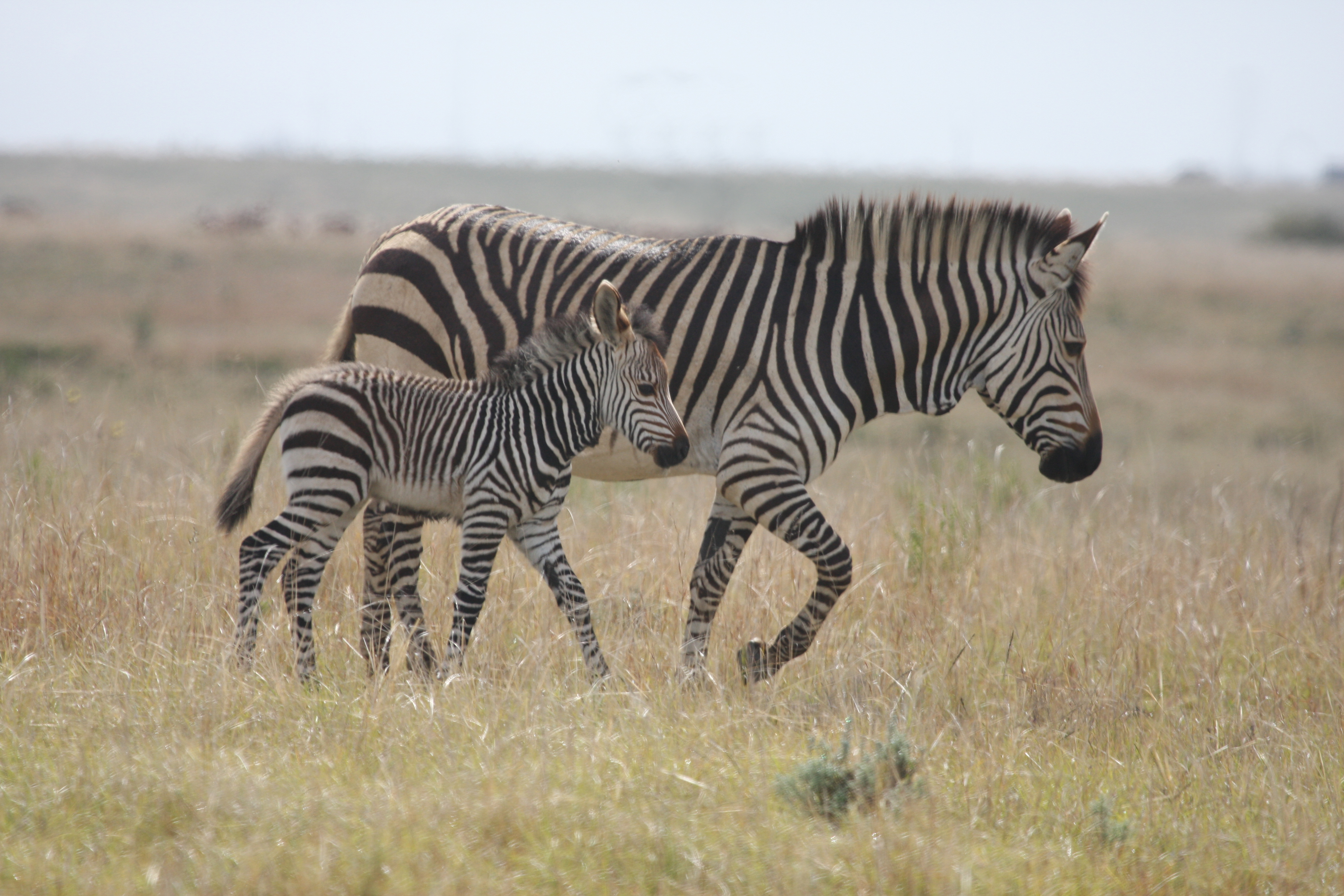
Cape mountain zebra and young

Like all zebra species, the Cape mountain zebra has a characteristic black and white striping pattern on its pelage, unique to individuals. As with other mountain zebras, it is medium-sized, thinner with narrower hooves than the common plains zebra, and has a white belly like the Grévy's zebra.

=== Physical attributes ===
==== Size and weight ====
The Cape mountain zebra differs slightly from the Hartmann's subspecies, being stockier and having longer ears and a larger dewlap. Adults have a shoulder height of 116 to 128 cm (46 to 50 in), making them the most lightly built subspecies of zebra. There is slight sexual dimorphism with mares having a mass of around 234 kg (516 lb) and stallions weighing around 255 kg (562 lb).

==== Stripes ====
Stripes of the Cape subspecies are narrower and therefore more numerous than the other two zebra species, although slightly wider than those of the Hartmann's subspecies. Stripes on the head are narrowest, followed by those on the body. Much broader, horizontal stripes are found in the hind area of Cape mountain zebra, lacking the "shadow stripes" seen in the plains zebra. Stripes on the hind legs are broader than those of the front legs, and striping continues all the way down to the hooves. However, the dark vertical stripes stop abruptly at the flanks, leaving the belly white.

== Distribution and habitat ==
Historically, the Cape mountain zebra occurred throughout the montane regions of the Cape Province of South Africa. Today they are confined to several mountain reserves and national parks: mainly the Mountain Zebra National Park, but also the Gamka Mountain Reserve and Karoo National Park, amongst many others. As its name implies, like all mountain zebras, the Cape mountain zebra is found on slopes and plateaus of mountainous regions, and can be found at up to 2,000 m (6,600 ft) above sea level in the summer, moving to lower elevations in the winter.

== Ecology and behaviour ==
The Cape mountain zebra (like Hartmann's subspecies) is predominantly diurnal or crepuscular, and is most active early morning and from late afternoon to sunset. It generally drinks twice a day, and a daily dustbath is usual.

=== Diet ===
The Cape mountain zebra is a graminivore, meaning that its diet consists mainly of grasses. It is a highly selective feeder, showing a preference for greener leafy plants, particularly the South African red grass and the weeping lovegrass. In marginal habitat such as fynbos, mountain zebra have been found to also feed on young restio shoots, as well as underground bulbs. Low growing, very coarse, small stalky grasses, as well as dying leaf material are usually avoided. It has been seen that the Cape subspecies is a climax grazer, meaning it feeds at quite a high level off the ground. This means that increasing the abundance of low level grazers such as springbok will reduce grass height to a level lower than the zebra's biting height, which could have detrimental consequences to the population.

=== Social structure ===
The Cape mountain zebra is not territorial, and populations consist of small groups of two types: breeding groups and bachelor groups. A breeding herd consists of a mature stallion and up to five mares and their foals. Stallions that cannot obtain mares associate in less defined bachelor groups. Once established, breeding groups normally stay together for many years; one stallion in the Mountain Zebra National Park is known to have stayed with his herd for more than a decade until he was at least 17 years old. Foals leave their herds on their own accord at around 22 months of age, and unlike the Hartmann subspecies whose mares force foals out, stallions of the Cape subspecies actually try to prevent them leaving. This behavior of foals in free-ranging populations could be a mechanism to prevent inbreeding.

If two breeding herds meet, the stallions of each herd will approach each other and perform a challenging ritual: body rubbing, touching noses and nasogenital contact. A dominance hierarchy exists but does not seem to correlate with leadership, which is selected randomly. It has been observed that the social hierarchy can change due to the birth of a foal: while fertile, lower ranking mares can threaten higher ranking ones, and mares with new-born foals are highly aggressive towards other members of the herd.

== Reproduction ==
A young Cape mountain zebra foal

Breeding occurs throughout the year with birth peaks in December to February (summer), and a gestation period of 1 year. A single new-born weighs 25 kg (55 lb), and are weaned off after 10 months. Bachelor males reach sexual maturity at 5–6 years when they are capable of becoming herd stallions, while mares produce their first foals at 3–6 years and can remain reproductively active until around 24 years of age.

== Conservation status and threats ==
Due to excessive and prolonged hunting and habitat destruction in South Africa, populations of Cape mountain zebra have declined greatly during the last 300 years. Although once classified as Endangered, the subspecies is currently listed as Least Concern by the IUCN Red List as its population is increasing. It is also listed on the CITES Appendix II due to being threatened with extinction and being affected by trade. The total population is currently estimated to be around 1,714 mature individuals, with low genetic variation indicating population fragmentation and drift. Mixing aboriginal populations is therefore used as a management strategy to try to avoid further loss of diversity.

Threats that the Cape subspecies still face are conversion of habitats to agricultural lands, competition with domestic livestock, hunting, persecution, and potential crossbreeding between the two subspecies, which would lead to further reduction of the already low genetic diversity.

Despite the increase of the Cape mountain zebra meta-population due to the growth of CMZ populations in state-owned protected areas, there are reasons for concern regarding the conservation status of CMZ and recommend further expansion and management of the meta-population. Many of the CMZ sub-populations are small and this renders them at risk of genetics drift, inbreeding depression, and susceptibility to disease.

=== Prevention of extinction ===
Although never locally abundant, the Cape mountain zebra historically occurred throughout the mountain ranges of the southern Cape Province of South Africa. By 1922 however, only 400 were believed to survive. In 1936, when Minister of Lands (and former Boer War general) Jan Kemp was asked to set aside a special reserve for the Cape mountain zebra, to which he gave his now infamous reply: "No! They're just a lot of donkeys in football jerseys."

A year later, in response to the continued decline, the government established the Mountain Zebra National Park on Acacia veld near Cradock, South Africa, but its small population of Cape mountain zebra died out in 1950. That same year reintroductions from nearby remnant populations began. Eleven animals were donated from a nearby farm in 1950, and in 1964 another small herd was added. By the late 1960s, the total Cape mountain population was only 140 but grew to 200 by 1979, with 75% of the animals residing in Mountain Zebra National Park. In 1984, the population was back to 400 individuals. Since then a few zebras have been reintroduced to the Cape Point Section of Table Mountain National Park.
