= Dysselsdorp =

- Location within Western Cape Location within South Africa
- Coordinates: 33°34′S 22°26′E
- Country: South Africa
- Province: Western Cape
- District: Garden Route
- Municipality: Oudtshoorn

Area
  - Total: 12.45 km^{2} (4.81 sq mi)

Population (2011)
  - Total: 12,544
  - Density: 1,008/km^{2} (2,610/sq mi)

Racial makeup (2011)
  - Black African: 3.9%
  - Coloured: 94.9%
  - Indian/Asian: 0.4%
  - White: 0.4%
  - Other: 0.4%

First languages (2011)
  - Afrikaans: 96.6%
  - English: 1.4%
  - Other: 1.9%
- Time zone: UTC+2 (SAST)
- Postal code (street): 6628
- PO box: 6628
- Area code: 044

Dysselsdorp is a small town that lies between Oudtshoorn and De Rust in the Little Karoo. It was founded as missionary station in 1838 for the emancipated slaves and dispossessed Khoekhoen who lived in the area. Since 1996 Dysselsdorp has been used as a case study for multiple agricultural reform programmes. 12 544 People live in Dysselsdorp and it is a predominantly Afrikaans-speaking coloured community. Majority of Dysselsdorp’s workers are employed in the agricultural industry or work in the nearby town of Oudtshoorn. Dysselsdorp is located in two wards of the Oudtshoorn Local Municipality.

== Name ==
There is no definite origin of the name Dysselsdorp. Documents as early as 1838 record a settlement in the same area by the name of Dysal’s Kraal. The name Dysseldorp is also found in reference to the same settlement in old documents.

== History ==
Human settlement in the area can be traced back as far as 1 700 years ago by the Khoekhoen. This can be evidenced by the numerous rock art found in the surrounding Swartberg and Kammanassie Mountains. Dysselsdorp was founded as a missionary station for the London Missionary Society in 1838 by Andrew Melvill. It served as a place of religious instruction and refuge for emancipated slaves and Khoekhoen inhabitants in the Little Karoo. In 1873 residents of the Dysselsdorp Missionary Station became private landowners of property that was ceded by the London Missionary Society. In 1892 a Town Council was established by Dysselsdorp residents, however it later fell under the administration of the Oudtshoorn Divisional Council in 1926.

In 1972, during the Apartheid era, residents inhabiting the area around Dysselsdorp were dispossessed of their residential and agricultural property. This made many residents impoverished and had to work as labourers on the surrounding farms. In 1985 there was an arson attack on a municipal building and in 1991 there was illegal occupation of the Dysselsdorp Police Station by ANC members as part of their Struggle against Apartheid. Since 1996 there have been multiple land reform programs launched in Dysselsdorp, although the socio-economic conditions have remained the same. In 2011 the former President Jacob Zuma visited the town to launch the National Rural Youth Service Corps, however this program has changed little the socio-economic conditions of many young people in Dysselsdorp.

== Geography ==
Dysselsdorp lies on the southern bank of the Olifants River, (Kwacao or “elephant river” in Khoekhoegowab) at the westernmost edge of the Kammanassie (“whirling waters” in Khoekhoegowab) Mountains. South of Dysselsdorp lies the Kammanassie River, and directly South lies the Kammanassie Dam. The Kammanassie River then confluences with the Doring (Kaukou or “thorny river” in Khoekhoegowab) before merging with the Olifants River between Dysselsdorp and Oudtshoorn. North of Dysselsdorp, across the Olifants river, lies the Cango (“wet mountains” in Khoekhoegowab) region, which are the foothills of the greater Swartberg Mountains. West of Dysselsdorp lies the town of Oudtshoorn and East of Dysselsdorp lies the smaller town of De Rust.

== Demographics ==
According to 2011 Census Dysselsdorp has a total population of 12 544. Compared to the 2001 Census where Dysselsdorp had a population of 11 491, indicating a population growth of 8.39%. In 2011 in Dysselsdorp 94.9% self-identified as Coloured and 96.6% had Afrikaans as their home language. 38.6% of Dysselsdorp’s inhabitants stated that they have some secondary school education, while 52.6% of the residents are female.

== Economy ==
The median income of Dysselsdorp’s inhabitants is between R19 601 and R38 200. Agriculture on the surrounding farms provides employment for certain residents, there is a liquorice extracting factory and nature reserves with private lodges surrounding the town. Dysselsdorp has also been described as a dormitory suburb for the nearby Oudtshoorn. Economic upliftment programmes such as the Comprehensive Rural Development have been launched in Dysselsdorp, however they end up failing.
