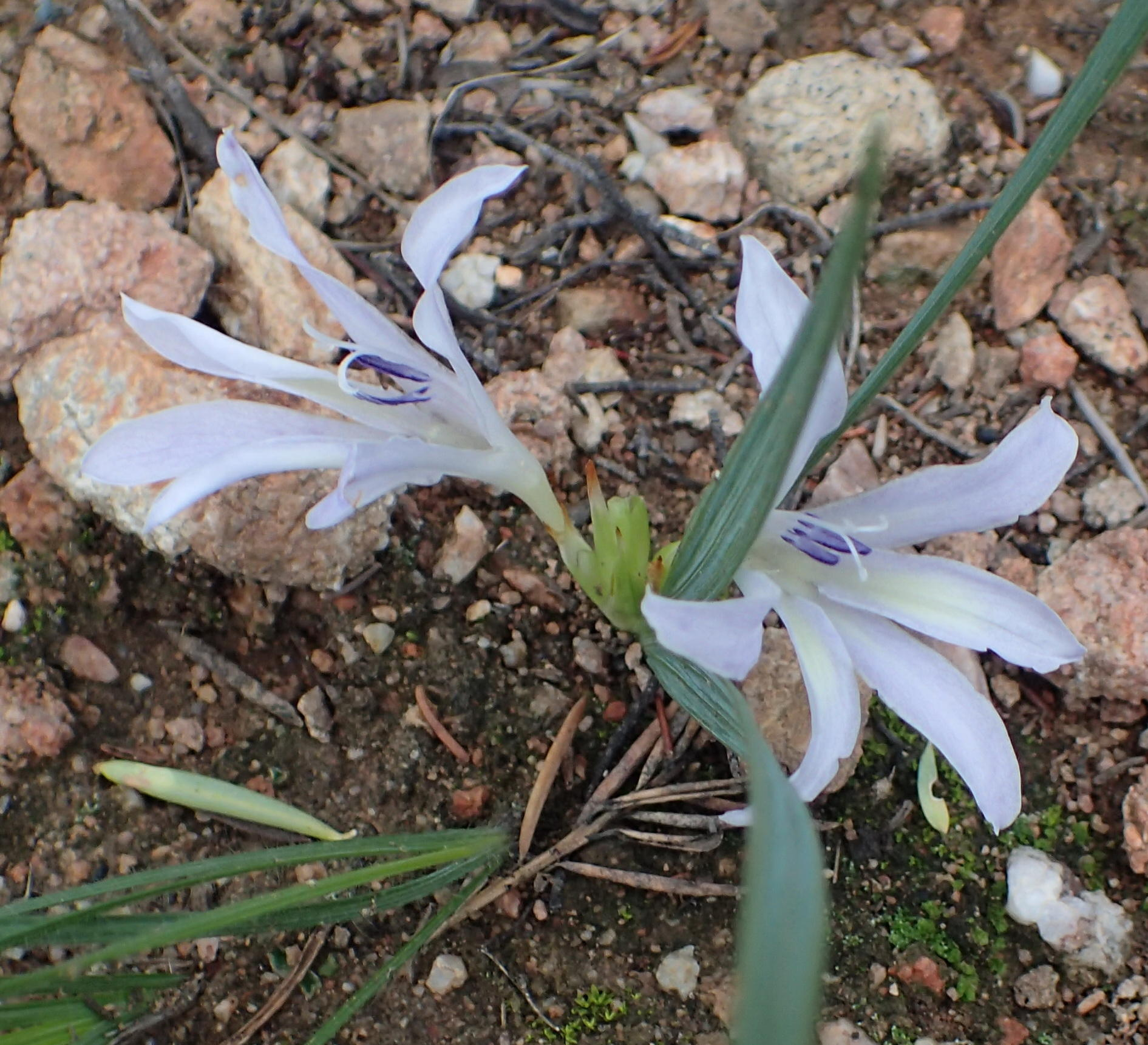

Scientific classification
- Kingdom: Plantae
- Clade: Tracheophytes
- Clade: Angiosperms
- Clade: Monocots
- Order: Asparagales
- Family: Iridaceae
- Genus: Babiana
- Species: B. karooica

Binomial name
- Babiana karooica Goldblatt & J.C.Manning, (2007)

= Babiana karooica =

Species of flowering plant

Babiana karooica is a species of geophytic, perennial flowering plant in the family Iridaceae. The species is endemic to the Western Cape and is part of the fynbos. It occurs from Oudtshoorn to De Rust and has a range of 120 km². The plant has lost its habitat to development and crop cultivation.
