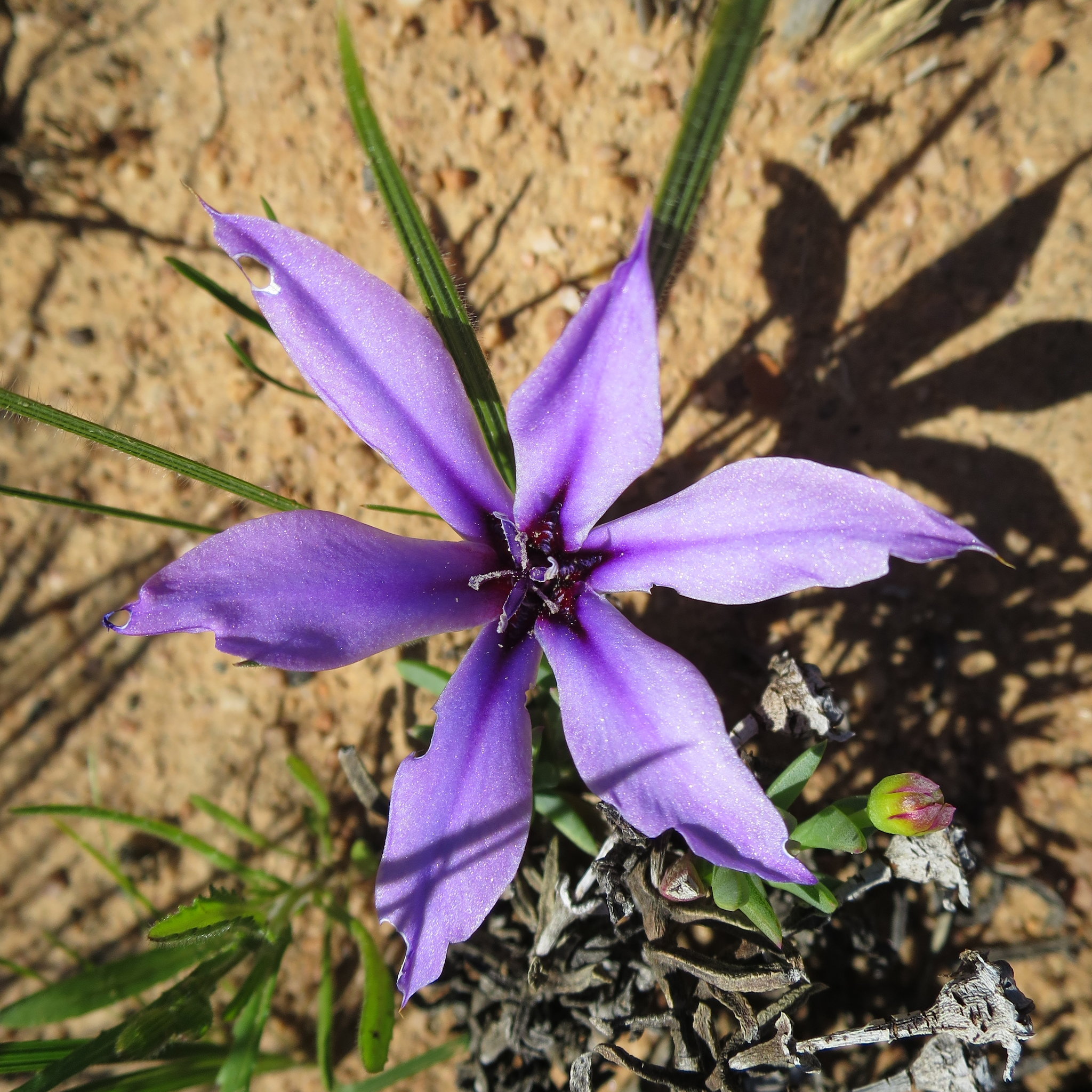

Scientific classification
- Kingdom: Plantae
- Clade: Tracheophytes
- Clade: Angiosperms
- Clade: Monocots
- Order: Asparagales
- Family: Iridaceae
- Genus: Babiana
- Species: B. radiata

Binomial name
- Babiana radiata Goldblatt & J.C.Manning

= Babiana radiata =

Species of flowering plant

Babiana radiata is a species of geophytic, perennial flowering plant in the family Iridaceae. The species is endemic to the Western Cape and occurs at De Rust near Oudtshoorn. It has an area of occurrence of less than 10 km^{2} and there were three small, fragmented subpopulations. However, one subpopulation was destroyed in 2006 during the expansion of agricultural activities. The other two grow on road shoulders and are threatened by road maintenance and construction.
