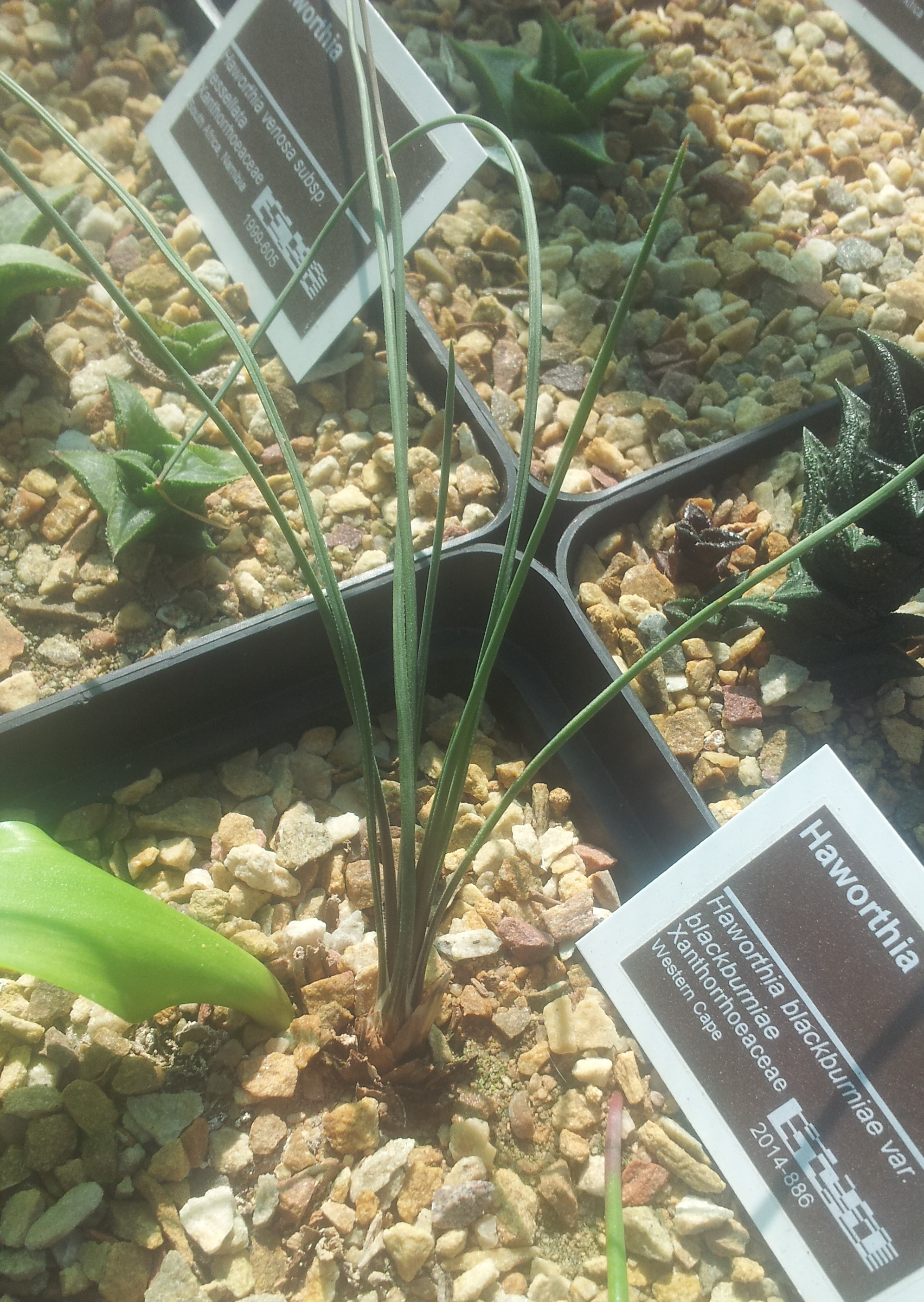

Scientific classification
- Kingdom: Plantae
- Clade: Tracheophytes
- Clade: Angiosperms
- Clade: Monocots
- Order: Asparagales
- Family: Asphodelaceae
- Subfamily: Asphodeloideae
- Genus: Haworthia
- Species: H. blackburniae

Binomial name
- Haworthia blackburniae W.F.Barker, (1937)

= Haworthia blackburniae =

Species of succulent

Haworthia blackburniae is a perennial succulent belonging to the genus Haworthia and is part of the fynbos and Succulent Karoo. The species is endemic to the Western Cape. It has a range of 3,717 km^{2} and the population is decreasing due to illegal trade in the succulent industry. The plant occurs on the foothills of the Swartberg between Ladismith and De Rust and southwards to Rooiberg and the Gamkaberg. The plant grows very slowly and is difficult to cultivate. At the foothills the plant is also threatened by invasive plants.
