= Kammanassie Dam =

- Interactive map of Kammanassie Dam
- Official name: Kammanassie Dam
- Location: Western Cape, South Africa
- Coordinates: 33°40′1″S 22°25′1″E
- Opening date: 1923
- Operators: Department of Water Affairs and Forestry

Dam and spillways
- Type of dam: gravity
- Impounds: Kammanassie River
- Height: 35 m
- Length: 390 m

Reservoir
- Creates: Kammanassie Dam Reservoir
- Total capacity: 35 870 000 m³
- Surface area: 351.6 ha

Kammanassie Dam is a gravity type dam located on the Kammanassie River, near De Rust, Western Cape, South Africa. It was established in 1923. The primary purpose of the dam is to provide water for irrigation, and its hazard potential has been ranked high (3).

== History ==
Followed unprecedented rain and the accompanied flood of 1916 in South Africa (after a long period of drought), special legislation was passed to provide relief to the victims of both the drought and the floods. The Department of Irrigation devoted itself to an active policy of continuous development, and this has led to the construction of a number of major dams with crest heights in excess of 20m. These include the Hartebeespoort Dam, Lake Mentz, the Tygerpoort Dam, the Kammanassie Dam, the Grassridge Dam, and Lake Arthur.

== See also ==
- List of reservoirs and dams in South Africa
- List of rivers of South Africa
