= De Hoop, South Africa =

De Hoop
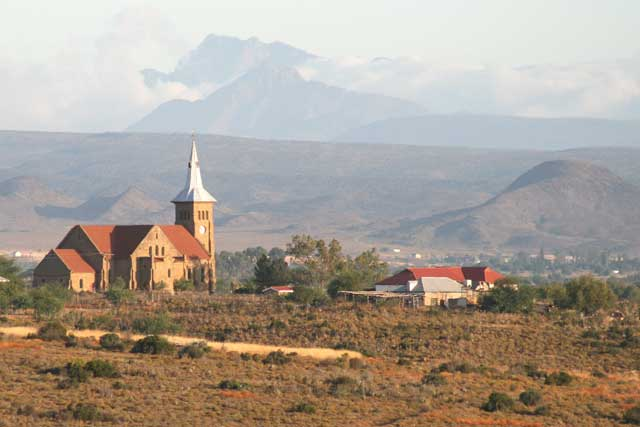
- De Hoop, Oudtshoorn

- Location within Western Cape Location within South Africa
- Coordinates: 33.607°S 22.045°E
- Country: South Africa
- Province: Western Cape
- District: Garden Route
- Municipality: Oudtshoorn

Area
  - Total: 0.57 km^{2} (0.22 sq mi)

Population (2011)
  - Total: 151
  - Density: 260/km^{2} (690/sq mi)

Racial makeup (2011)
  - Coloured: 71.3%
  - White: 28.7%

First languages (2011)
  - Afrikaans: 99.3%
  - Other: 0.7%
- Time zone: UTC+2 (SAST)

De Hoop is a town in Oudtshoorn Local Municipality in the Western Cape province of South Africa.

Village of the Dutch Reformed Church 16 km west of Oudtshoorn. It was laid out in July 1908 and so named with reference to Rom. 5:5, 'hope maketh not ashamed'; the definite article is often used in Dutch and Afrikaans in conjunction with abstract nouns.
