= Oudtshoorn Local Municipality =

Oudtshoorn
- Local municipality
- Seal

- Location in the Western Cape
- Coordinates: 33°40′S 22°10′E
- Country: South Africa
- Province: Western Cape
- District: Garden Route
- Seat: Oudtshoorn
- Wards: 13

Government
  - Type: Municipal council
  - Mayor: Jan van der Ross (ANC)
  - Deputy Mayor: Veronica Michaels (Suid-Kaap Saamstaan)
  - Speaker: Suzanne Jansen (PA)

Area
  - Total: 3,537 km^{2} (1,366 sq mi)

Population (2022)
  - Total: 138,257
  - Density: 39.09/km^{2} (101.2/sq mi)

Racial makeup (2022)
  - Black African: 8.0%
  - Coloured: 76.1%
  - Indian/Asian: 0.3%
  - White: 8.9%

First languages (2011)
  - Afrikaans: 91.0%
  - Xhosa: 4.8%
  - English: 2.3%
  - Other: 1.9%
- Time zone: UTC+2 (SAST)
- Municipal code: WC045

Oudtshoorn Municipality (Afrikaans: Oudtshoorn Munisipaliteit) is a local municipality within the Garden Route District Municipality, in the Western Cape province of South Africa. As of 2022, the population was 138,257.

== Geography ==
The municipality covers an area of 3,537 square kilometres (1,366 sq mi) in the Little Karoo, stretching from the Swartberg mountains in the north to the Outeniqua Mountains in the south, and from the Gamkaberg in the west to the Kammanassie Mountains in the east. It abuts on the Prince Albert Municipality to the north, the George Municipality to the east, the Mossel Bay Municipality to the south, the Hessequa Municipality to the southwest and the Kannaland Municipality to the west.

== Demographics ==
According to the 2022 South African census, the municipality had a population of 138,257 people. Of those, 76.1% identified as "Coloured," 8.9% as "White," and 8% as "Black African." Between 2011 and 2022, the population grew at an annual rate of 3.6%.

Most of the residents of the municipality live in the town of Oudtshoorn, which as of 2011 has a population of 61,507. East of Oudtshoorn are the towns of Dysselsdorp (pop. 12,544) and De Rust (pop. 3,566). There are small agricultural villages at Armoed (pop. 472) and De Hoop (pop. 151).

== History ==
At the end of the apartheid era, the area that is today the Oudtshoorn Municipality formed part of the Klein Karoo Regional Services Council (RSC). The towns of Oudtshoorn and De Rust were governed by municipal councils elected by their white residents. The coloured residents of Bridgton (Oudtshoorn) and Blomnek (De Rust) were governed by management committees subordinate to the white councils. Dysselsdorp was also governed by a management committee. Bongolethu was governed by a town council established under the Black Local Authorities Act, 1982.

After the national elections of 1994 a process of local government transformation began, in which negotiations were held between the existing local authorities, political parties, and local community organisations. As a result of these negotiations, the existing local authorities were dissolved and transitional local councils (TLCs) were created for each town and village. In December 1994 the De Rust/Blomnek TLC replaced the Municipality of De Rust and Blomnek Management Committee. In January 1995 the Oudtshoorn TLC replaced the Municipality of Oudtshoorn, Bridgton Management Committee and Bongolethu Town Council. In the same month the Dysselsdorp TLC replaced the Dysselsdorp Management Committee.

The transitional councils were initially made up of members nominated by the various parties to the negotiations, until May 1996 when elections were held. At the time of these elections the Klein Karoo District Council was established in place of the Klein Karoo RSC, and transitional representative councils (TRCs) were elected to represent rural areas outside the TLCs on the District Council. The area that was to become Oudtshoorn Municipality included the Oudtshoorn TRC and a small part of the Bo-Langkloof TRC.

At the local elections of December 2000 the TLCs and TRCs were dissolved and the Oudtshorn Municipality was established as a single local authority. At the same election the Klein Karoo District Council was dissolved and replaced by the Eden District Municipality.

== Politics ==
The municipal council consists of twenty-five members elected by mixed-member proportional representation. Thirteen councillors are elected by first-past-the-post voting in thirteen wards, while the remaining twelve are chosen from party lists so that the total number of party representatives is proportional to the number of votes received.

In the election of 4 November 2026 no party obtained a majority of seats on the council.

The following table shows the results of the 2026 election.

Party	Ward			List			Total seats
Party	Votes	%	Seats	Votes	%	Seats	Total seats
Democratic Alliance	9,776	37.40	10	10,031	38.17	0	10
African National Congress	5,107	19.54	3	5,131	19.52	2	5
Patriotic Alliance	3,243	12.41	0	3,301	12.56	3	3
Freedom Front Plus	2,700	10.33	0	2,636	10.03	3	3
Advieskantoor	972	3.72	0	894	3.40	1	1
Independent Civic Organisation of South Africa	907	3.47	0	928	3.53	1	1
Restore Azania Movement	701	2.68	0	653	2.48	1	1
Bridgton Civic Association	541	2.07	0	518	1.97	1	1
Independent candidates	46	0.18	0				0
14 other parties	2,149	8.22	0	2,188	8.33	0	0
Total	26,142	100.00	13	26,280	100.00	12	25
Valid votes	26,142	98.61		26,280	98.73		
Invalid/blank votes	369	1.39		339	1.27		
Total votes	26,511	100.00		26,619	100.00		
Registered voters/turnout	56,473	46.94		56,473	47.14		

== Coats of arms ==
Municipality (1) — The town council adopted the Van Reede van Oudtshoorn arms "with certain modifications" on 7 February 1908. The arms were : Argent, two bars dancetty Sable (i.e. a silver shield with two black zig-zag stripes across it), with two golden gryphons as supporters. A golden mural crown was placed above the shield (this appears to have been the "modification").

Oudtshoorn coat of arms (1960)

Municipality (2) — The arms were re-designed in 1959 by Ivan Mitford-Barberton and H. Ellis Tomlinson, and granted by the College of Arms on 9 September 1960. They were registered with the Cape Provincial Administration in June 1961 and at the Bureau of Heraldry in October 1970.

The changes to the design were the addition of a red chief bearing a golden mural crown to the shield; the addition of a crest consisting of a pair of black wings inside a golden ring; and each supporter was given an ostrich feather to hold. For some reason, the municipal council later changed the colours: the chief was changed to gold and the mural crown to red, the wings were changed to silver and the ring to red, and the gryphons were changed from gold to red. The registration at the Bureau does not appear to have been amended to reflect these alterations.

== Corruption ==
On 15 December 2021, employees of the municipality allegedly paid R3 million to an entity masquerading as a legitimate contractor.
