= Karoo =

Semi-desert region in South Africa

Karoo Karo
- Natural region
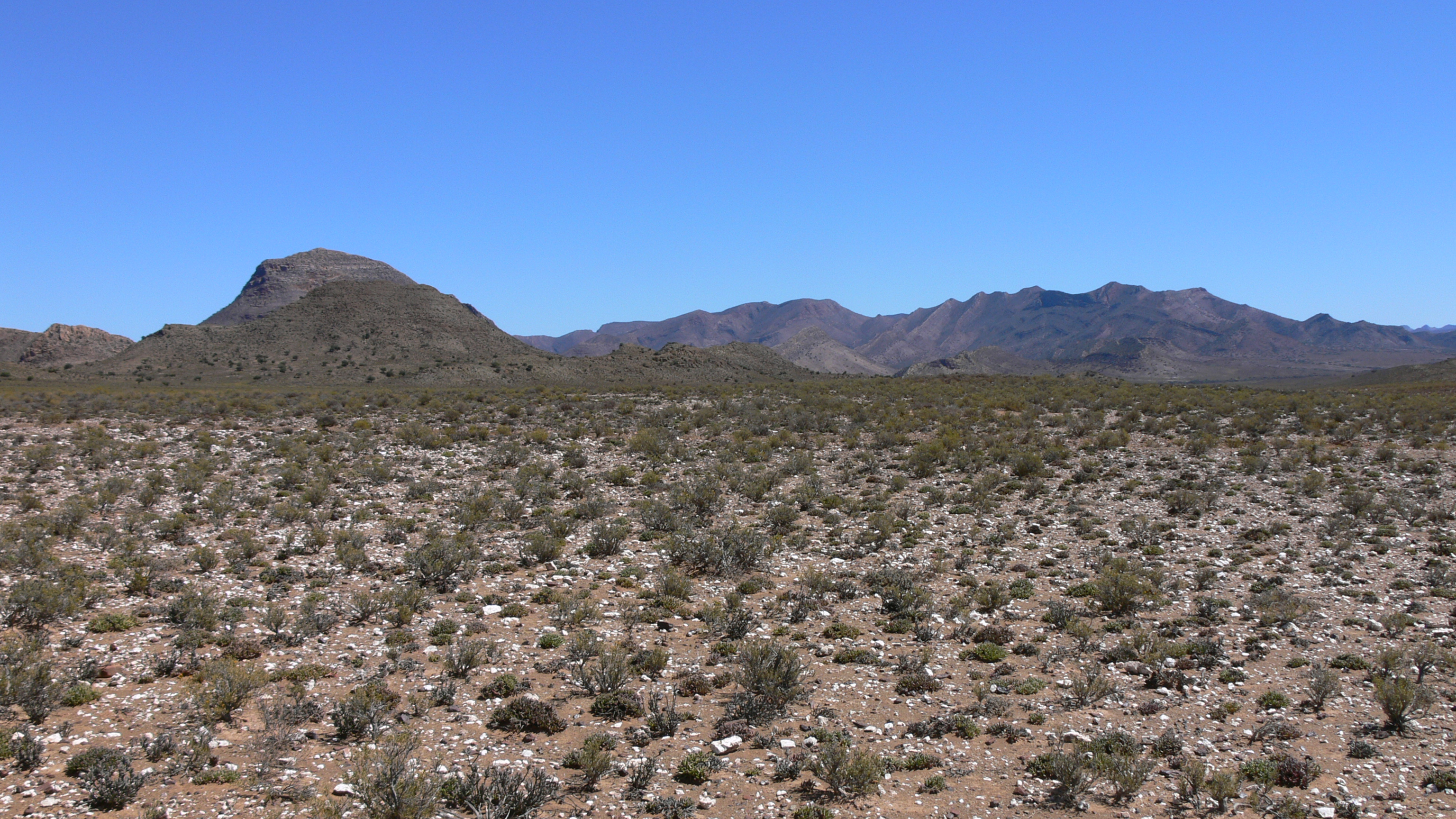
- Typical Karoo vegetation to the south of Matjiesfontein, with the Anysberg Mountains visible in the background

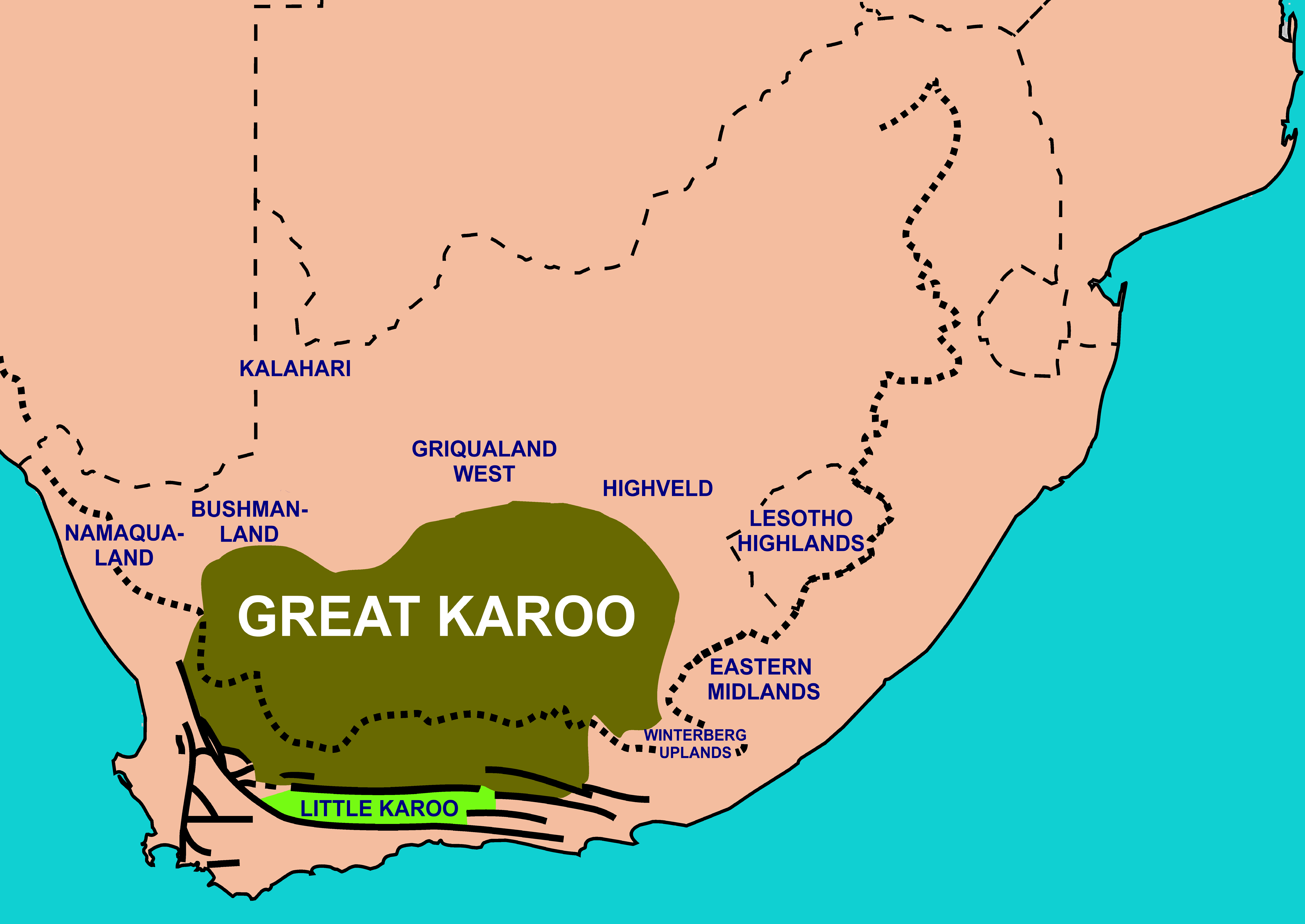
- Extent of the Karoo (olive-green) and Klein Karoo (bright green) in South Africa, with the names of surrounding areas in blue. The thick interrupted line indicates the course of the Great Escarpment which delimits the Central South African Plateau. To the immediate south and south-west the solid lines trace the parallel ranges of the Cape Fold Belt.
- Coordinates: 32.27°S 22.31°E
- Country: South Africa

The Karoo (/kəˈruə/ kə-ROO-ə; likely from Khoikhoi (also known as Khoekhoegowab/Namagowab) word Karo (Korana for 'hard, dry, desert')) is a semidesert natural region of South Africa. No exact definition of what constitutes the Karoo is available, so its extent is also not precisely defined. The Karoo is partly defined by its topography, geology and climate, and above all, its low rainfall, arid air, cloudless skies, and extremes of heat and cold. The Karoo is also known for the exposure of fossiliferous rocks of the Karoo Supergroup, which record in detail ecological changes in the region when it formed part of southern Pangaea from the Middle Permian to the Early Jurassic, around 270 to 200 million years ago.

The Karoo formed an almost impenetrable barrier to the interior from Cape Town, and early adventurers, explorers, hunters, and travelers on the way to the Highveld unanimously denounced it as a frightening place of great heat, great frosts, great floods, and great droughts. Today, it is still a place of great heat and frosts, with an annual rainfall of between 50 and 250 mm (2.0–9.8 in). On some of the surrounding mountains it can be 250 to 500 mm (9.8–19.7 in) higher than on the plains. However, underground water is found throughout the Karoo, which is tapped by boreholes, making permanent settlements and sheep farming possible.

The xerophytic vegetation consists of aloes, mesembryanthemums, crassulas, euphorbias, stapelias, and desert ephemerals, spaced 50 cm (20 in) or more apart, becoming very sparse going northwards into Bushmanland and, from there, into the Kalahari Desert. The driest region of the Karoo, however, is its southwestern corner, between the Great Escarpment and the Cederberg-Skurweberg mountain ranges, called the Tankwa Karoo, which receives only 75 mm (3.0 in) of rain annually. The eastern and north-eastern Karoo are often covered by large patches of grassland. The typical Karoo vegetation previously supported large game, sometimes in vast herds.

Today, sheep thrive on the xerophytes, though each sheep requires about 4 hectares (9.9 acres) of grazing to sustain itself.

== Divisions ==
The Karoo is divided into the Great Karoo and the Klein Karoo. The Klein Karoo is delimited in the south by the Outeniqua–Langeberg Mountains that run east–west parallel to the coast, and in the north by the Swartberg Mountain Range that also runs east–west. The Great Karoo lies to the north of the Swartberg.

=== Great Karoo ===
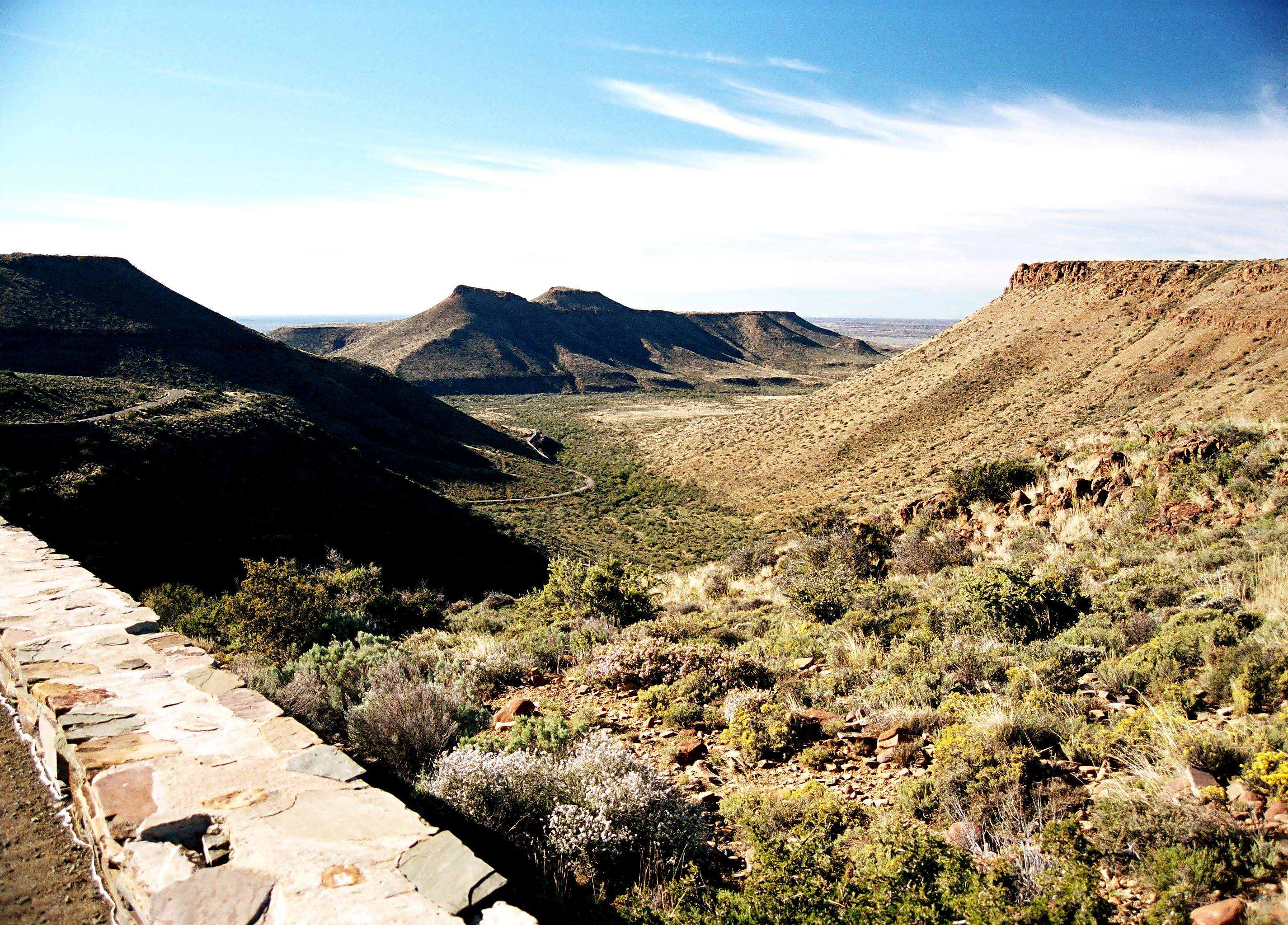
A view from the top of the Great Escarpment in the Karoo National Park near Beaufort West, looking south across the plains of the Lower Karoo: Note the remnants and extent of the former central plateau on the plain below the escarpment (see diagram on the right). Also note the dolerite sills which top the escarpment and mountains in the middle distance, giving these structures their characteristic flat-topped appearance.

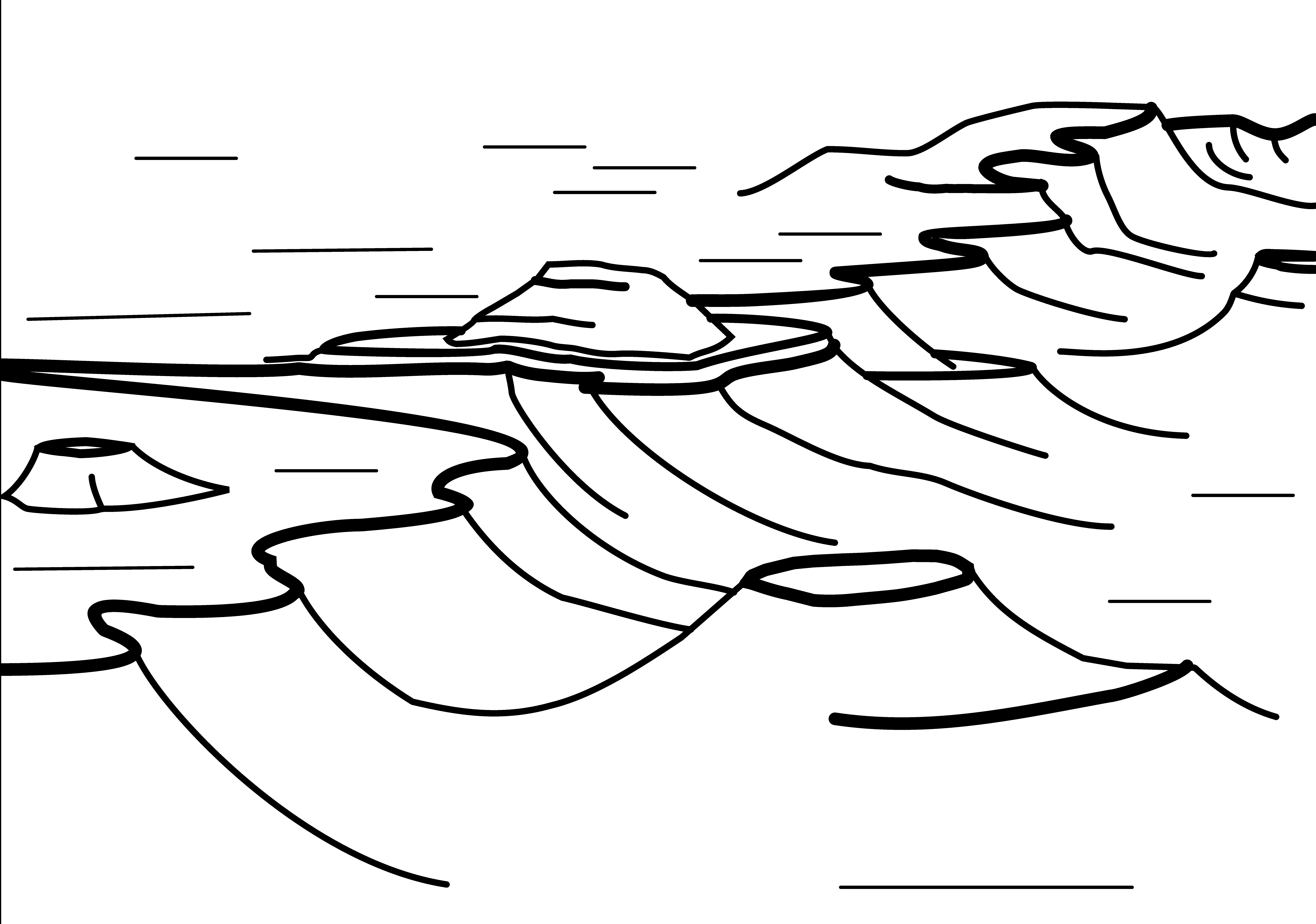
A stylized illustration of the Great Escarpment, based particularly on its appearance in the Great Karoo, where thick erosion resistant dolerite sills (see below; represented here by the thick black lines. The thinner dolerite sills are not drawn in this diagram to avoid clutter) generally form the upper, sharp edge of the escarpment. (In other parts of the escarpment, hard erosion-resistant geological layers similarly form the upper, abrupt edge.) Note the island remnants of the earlier extent of the plateau on the plain below the escarpment (the Lower Karoo), left behind as the escarpment has gradually eroded further inland.

The only sharp and definite boundary of the Great Karoo is formed by the most inland ranges of Cape Fold Mountains to the south and south-west. The extent of the Karoo to the north is vague, fading gradually and almost imperceptibly into the increasingly arid Bushmanland towards the north-west. To the north and north-east, it fades into the savannah and grasslands of Griqualand West and the Highveld. The boundary to the east grades into the grasslands of the Eastern Midlands. The Great Karoo is itself divided by the Great Escarpment into the Upper Karoo (generally above 1,200–1,500 m (3,900–4,900 ft)) and the Lower Karoo on the plains below at 700–800 m (2,300–2,600 ft). A great many local names, each denoting different subregions of the Great Karoo, exist, some more widely, or more generally, known than others. In the Lower Karoo, going from west to east, they are the Tankwa Karoo, the Moordenaarskaroo, the Koup, the Vlakte, and the Camdeboo Plains. The Hantam, Kareeberge, Roggeveld, and Uweveld are the better known subregions of the Upper Karoo, though most of it is simply known as the Upper Karoo, especially in the north.

=== Klein Karoo ===
The Klein Karoo's boundaries are sharply defined by mountain ranges to the west, north, and south. The road between Uniondale and Willowmore is considered, by convention, to form the approximate arbitrary eastern extremity of the Klein Karoo. Its extent is much smaller than that of the Great Karoo. It is called the Klein Karoo, Afrikaans for Little Karoo.

== Geography ==
=== Great Karoo ===
The Great Karoo straddles the 30° S parallel on the west of the continent, in a similar position to other semidesert areas on earth, north and south of the equator. It is in the rainfall shadow of the Cape Fold Mountains along the western coastline. The western "Lower Karoo" (the Tankwa Karoo and Moordenaarskaroo) contain remnants of the Cape Fold Mountains (e.g. the Witteberg and Anysberg Mountains) which give it a moderate hilly appearance, but further east, the Lower Karoo becomes a monotonously flat plain. The "Upper Karoo" has been intruded by dolerite sills (see below), creating multiple flat-topped hills, or Karoo Koppies, which are iconic of the Great Karoo.

The vegetation of the Upper is similar to the Lower Karoo, so few people make a distinction between the two.

The main highway (the N1) and railway line from Cape Town to the north enter the Lower Karoo from the Hex River Valley just before Touws River and follow a course about 50 km (31 mi) south of the Great Escarpment up to Beaufort West. Thereafter, they gradually ascend the Great Escarpment along a broad valley to Three Sisters on the Central Plateau and the Upper Karoo.

Turning north from the N1 between Touws River and Beaufort West, at Matjiesfontein, the road ascends the Great Escarpment through the Verlatenkloof Pass to reach Sutherland, at 1,456 m (4,777 ft) above sea level, which is reputedly the coldest town in South Africa with average minimum temperatures of −6.1 °C (21.0 °F) during winter. Parts of the eastern Mpumalangan Highveld do at times experience lower temperatures than Sutherland, but not as consistently as Sutherland does. Snowfall is not infrequent during the southern winter months. The South African Astronomical Observatory has an emplacement of telescopes about 20 km (12 mi) east of the town, on a small plateau 1,798 m (5,899 ft) above sea level, and is home to the Southern African Large Telescope, the largest optical telescope in the Southern Hemisphere. To the north, still on the Plateau, and 75 km (47 mi) north-west of Carnarvon, seven radio dishes form part of the Square Kilometer Array which will, 2500 in total, be scattered in other parts of South Africa and Australia, to survey the southern skies at radio frequencies. Our galaxy, the Milky Way, one of the main targets of this enterprise, is best viewed from the Southern Hemisphere. The Upper Karoo is indeed an ideal site for an astronomical observatory. This is not only because of the clear skies, absence of artificial lights, and high altitude, but also because it is tectonically completely inactive (meaning that there are no fault lines or volcanoes nearby, and no earth tremors or earthquakes occur, even at great distances).

=== Klein Karoo ===
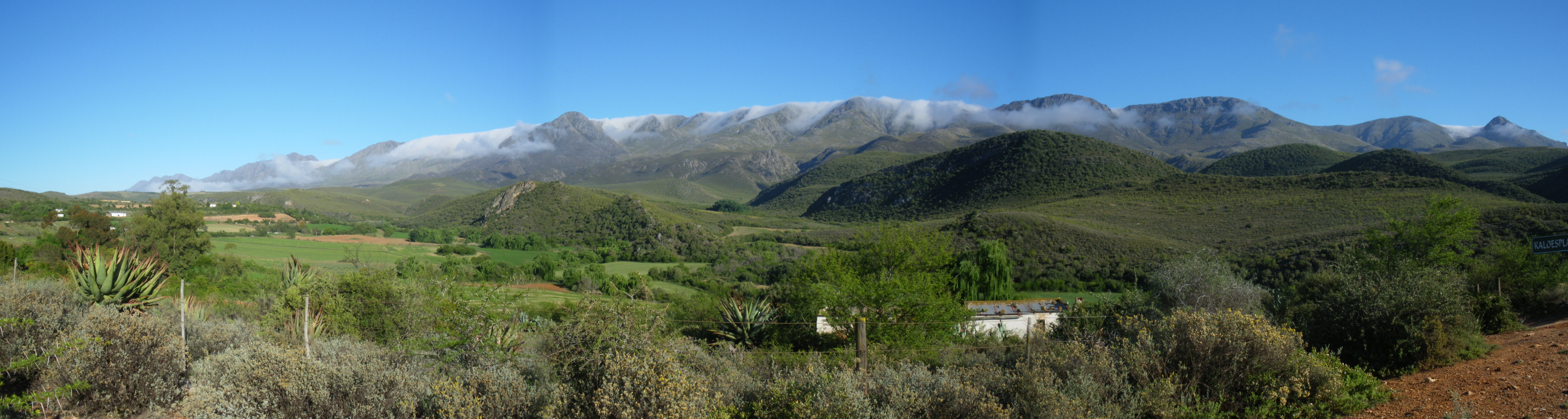
Farmlands along the well-watered, fertile foothills of the plus 2,000 m (6,600 ft) high Swartberg Mountains (in the background) along the northern strip of the Klein Karoo

The Klein Karoo is separated from the Great Karoo by the Swartberg Mountain range. Geographically, it is a 290 km (180 mi) long valley, only 40 to 60 km (25–37 mi) wide, formed by two parallel Cape Fold Mountain ranges, the Swartberg to the north, and the continuous Langeberg-Outeniqua range to the south. The northern strip of the valley, within 10–20 km (6.2–12.4 mi) from the foot of the Swartberg mountains is least karoo-like, in that it is a well-watered area both from the rain and the many streams that cascade down the mountain, or through narrow defiles in the Swartberg from the Great Karoo. The main towns of the region are situated along this northern strip of the Klein Karoo: Montagu, Barrydale, Ladismith, Calitzdorp, Oudtshoorn, and De Rust, as well as such well-known mission stations such as Zoar, Amalienstein, and Dysselsdorp.

The southern 30 to 50 km (19–31 mi) wide strip, north of the Langeberg range, is as arid as the western Lower Karoo, except in the east, where the Langeberg range (arbitrarily) starts to be called the Outeniqua Mountains.

The Klein Karoo can only be accessed by road through the narrow defiles cut through the surrounding Cape Fold Mountains by ancient, but still flowing, rivers. A few roads traverse the mountains over passes, the most famous and impressive of which is the Swartberg Pass between Oudtshoorn in the Klein Karoo and Prince Albert on the other side of the Swartberg mountains in the Great Karoo. Also, the main road between Oudtshoorn and George, on the coastal plain, crosses the mountains to the south via the Outeniqua Pass. The only exit from the Klein Karoo that does not involve crossing a mountain range is through the 150 km (93 mi) long, narrow Langkloof valley between Uniondale and Humansdorp, near Plettenberg Bay.

== Geology of the Karoo ==
=== The Great Karoo ===
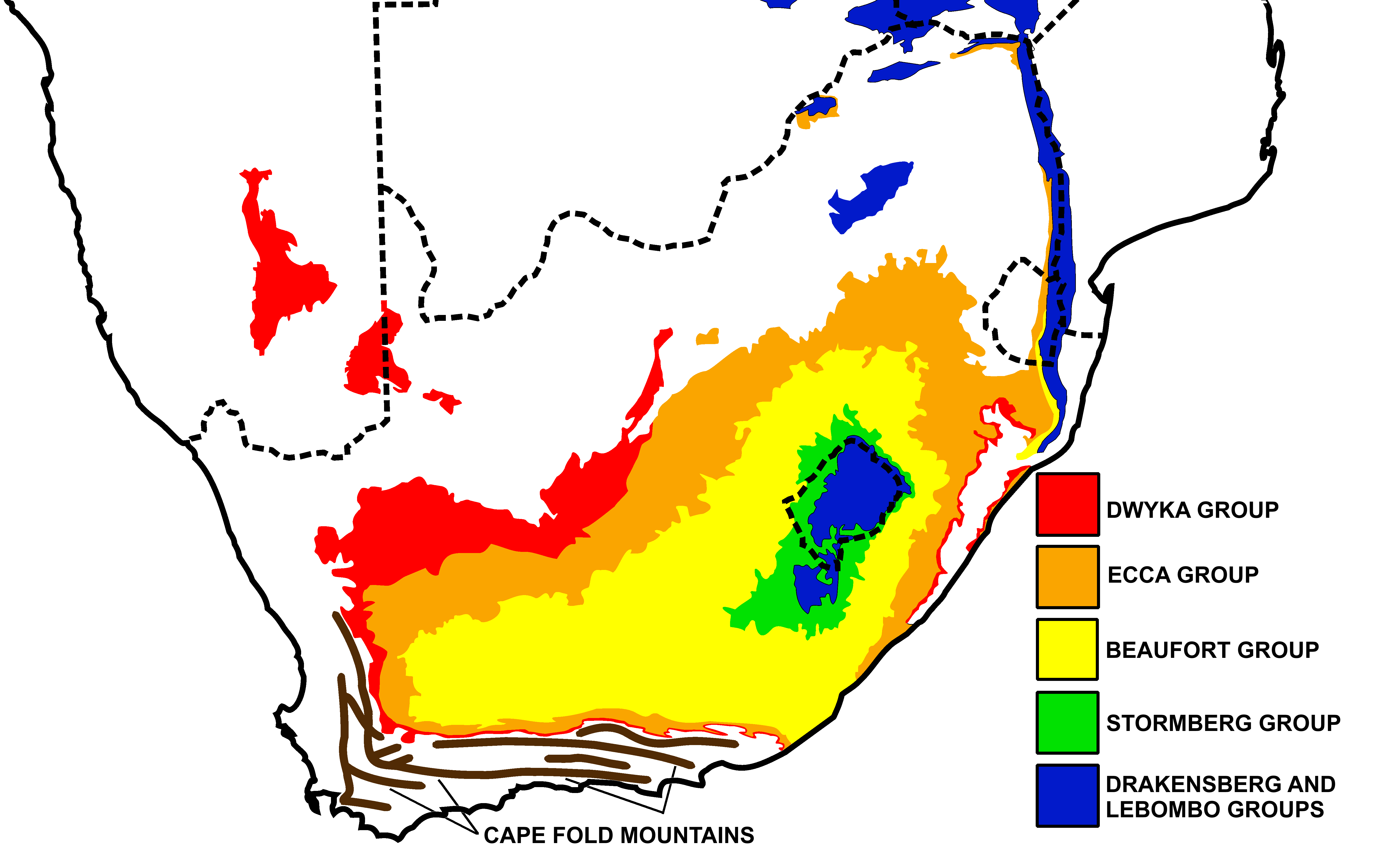
A schematic geological map of the outcrops (surface exposures) of the Karoo Supergroup rocks in Southern Africa: The location and approximate structure of the Cape Fold Mountains are also diagrammatically indicated for reference purposes.

In geological terms, the Karoo Supergroup refers to an extensive and geologically recent (180–310 million years old) sequence of sedimentary and igneous rocks, which is flanked to the south by the Cape Fold Mountains, and to the north by the more ancient Ventersdorp Lavas, the Transvaal Supergroup and Waterberg Supergroup. It covers two-thirds of South Africa and extends in places to 8,000 m (26,000 ft) below the land surface, constituting an immense volume of rocks which was formed, geologically speaking, in a short period of time. Although almost the whole of the Great Karoo is situated on Karoo Supergroup rocks, the geological Karoo rocks extend over a very much larger area, both within South Africa and Lesotho, but also beyond its borders and onto other continents that formed part of Gondwana.

=== Geological history of the Karoo Supergroup ===
Extinct Karoo vertebrates

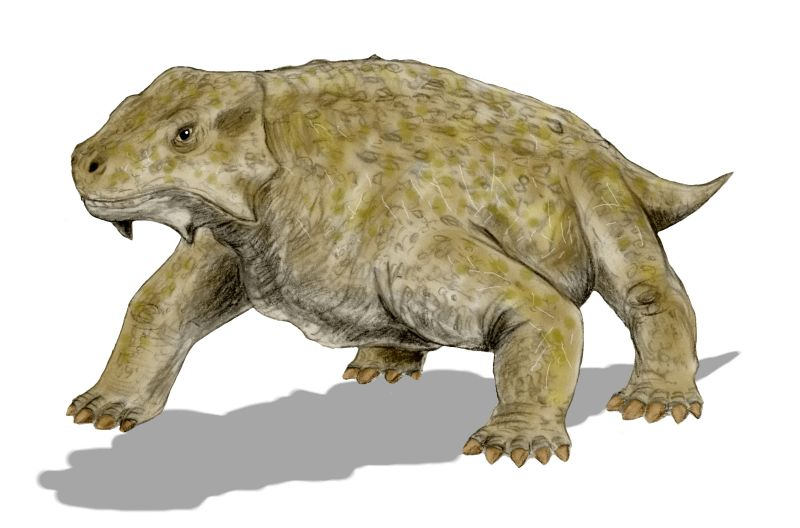
Bradysaurus

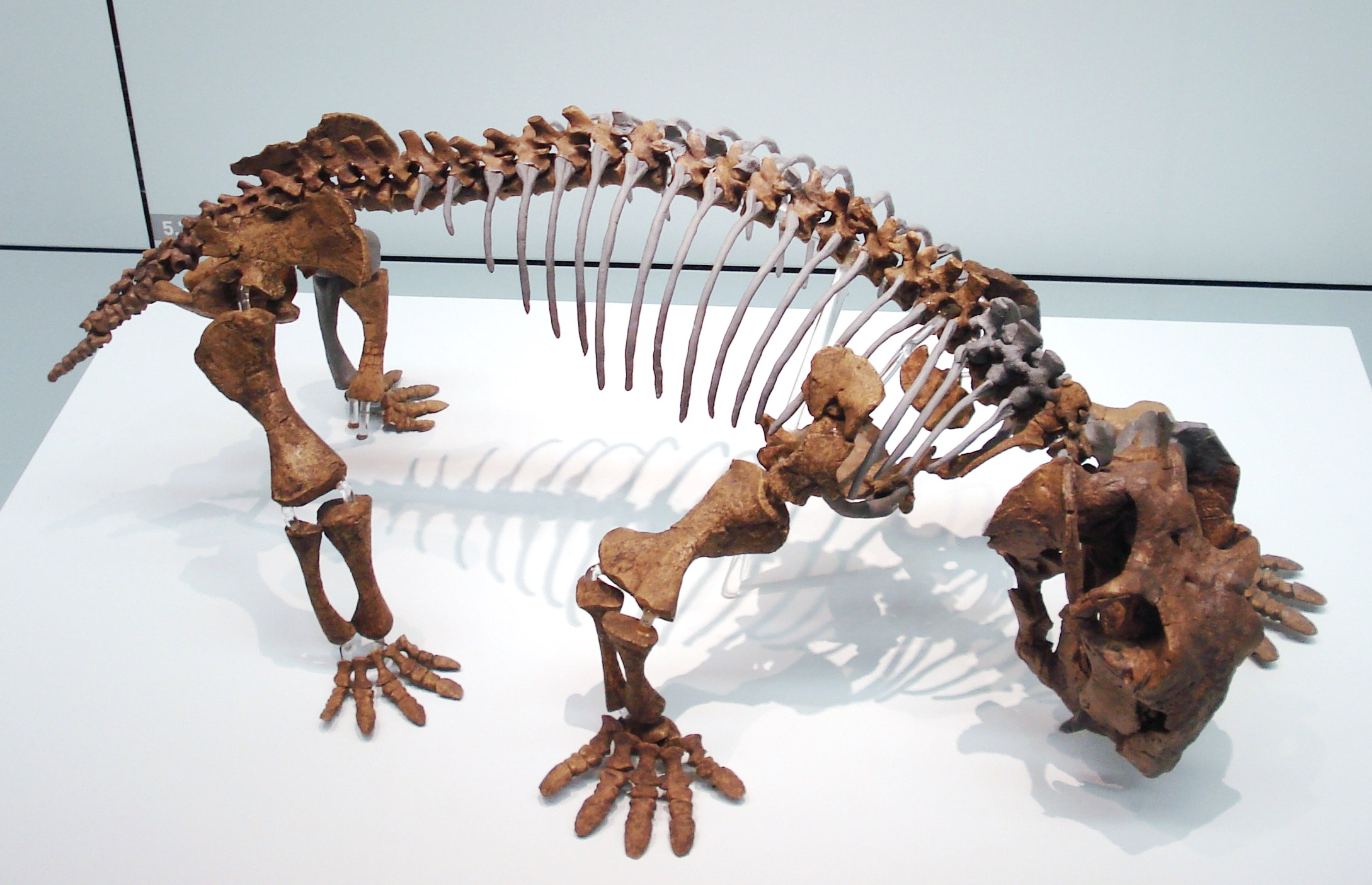
Lystrosaurus

The Karoo Supergroup was formed in a vast inland basin starting 320 million years ago, at a time when that part of Gondwana which would eventually become Africa, lay over the South Pole. Icebergs that had calved from the glaciers and ice sheets to the north deposited a one kilometre (0.62 mi) thick layer of mud containing dropstones of varying origins and sizes into this basin. This became the Dwyka Group consisting primarily of tillite, the lowermost layer of the Karoo Supergroup. As Gondwana drifted northwards, the basin turned into an inland sea with extensive swampy deltas along its northern shores. The peat in these swamps eventually turned into large deposits of coal which are mined in KwaZulu-Natal and on the Highveld. This three kilometres (1.9 mi) thick layer is known as the Ecca Group, which is overlain by the 5.6 km (3.5 mi) thick Beaufort Group, laid down on a vast plain with Mississippi-like rivers depositing mud from an immense range of mountains to the south. Ancient reptiles and amphibians prospered in the wet forests, and their remains have made the Karoo famous amongst palaeontologists. The first of these Karoo fossils was discovered in 1838 by Scottish born Andrew Geddes Bain at a road cutting near Fort Beaufort. He sent his specimens to the British Museum, where fellow Scotsman Robert Broom recognised the Karoo fossils' mammal-like characteristics in 1897.

After the Beaufort period, Southern Africa (still part of Gondwana) became an arid sand desert with only ephemeral rivers and pans. These sands consolidated to form the Stormberg Group, the remnants of which are found only in the immediate vicinity of Lesotho. Several dinosaur nests, containing eggs, some with dinosaur fetal skeletons in them, have been found in these rocks, near what had once been a swampy pan.

Finally, about 180 million years ago, volcanic activity took place on a titanic scale. This brought an end to a flourishing reptile evolution. Some of the, mainly pre-dinosaur, reptile genera of the Karoo which became extinct are shown in the list below.

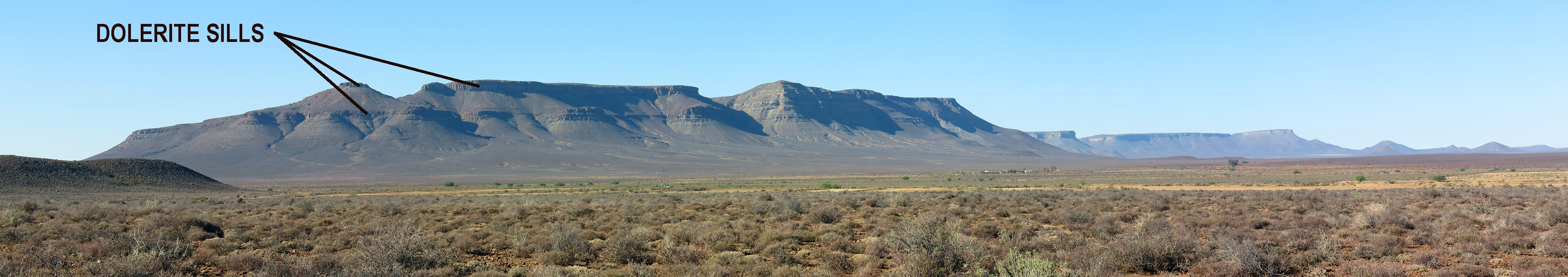
Flat-topped hills (called Karoo Koppies) are highly characteristic of the southern and southwestern Karoo landscape.

Karoo Koppies are hills which are capped by hard, erosion-resistant dolerite sills. This is solidified lava that was forced under high pressure between the horizontal strata of the sedimentary rocks that make up most of the Karoo's geology. This occurred about 180 million years ago, when huge volumes of lava were extruded over most of Southern Africa and adjoining regions of Gondwana, both on the surface and deep below the surface between the sedimentary strata. Since this massive extrusion of lava, Southern Africa has undergone a prolonged period of erosion, exposing the older, softer rocks, except where they were protected by a cap of dolerite. The reptile genera which became extinct through the volcanic anctivity include:

- Mesosaurus, aquatic Dwyka carnivore
- Bradysaurus, Beaufort Group herbivore
- Owenetta, Beaufort Group insectivore
- Procolophon, Beaufort Group omnivore
- Diictodon, Permian synapsid
- Rubidgea, Permian predator
- Lystrosaurus, Triassic herbivorous therapsid
- Thrinaxodon, Triassic carnivorous therapsid
- Euparkeria, archosaur
- Massospondylus, late Triassic to early Jurassic herbivorous, bipedal dinosaur
- Megazostrodon, early mammal

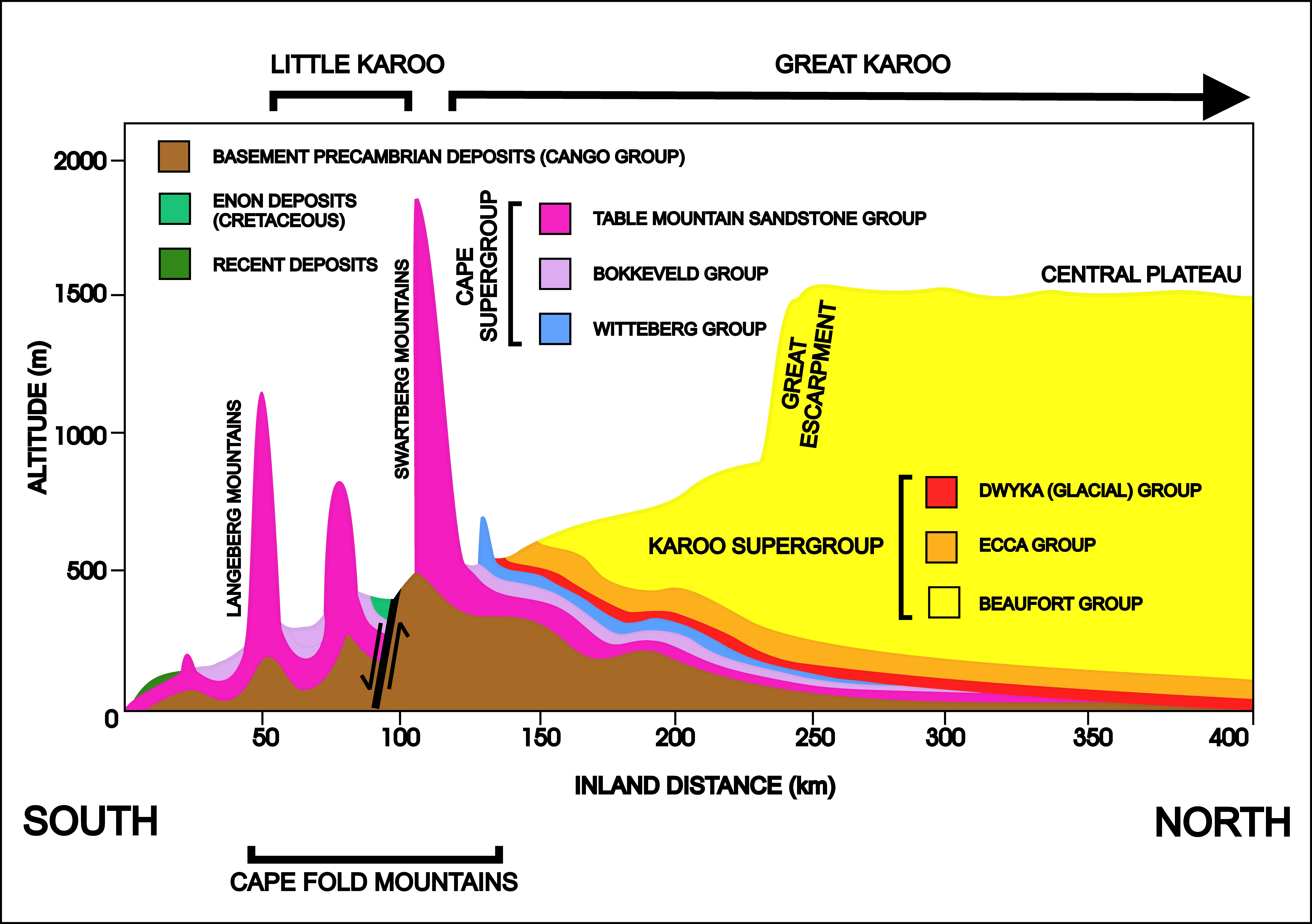
A diagrammatic 400 km north–south cross-section through the southern portion of the country at approximately 21° 30' E (i.e. near Calitzdorp in the Klein Karoo), showing the relationship between the Cape Fold Mountains (and their geological structure) and the geology of the Klein and Great Karoo, as well as the position of the Great Escarpment. The colour code for the Karoo rocks is the same as those used in the above diagram. The heavy black line flanked by opposing arrows is the fault that runs for nearly 300 km along the southern edge of the Swartberg Mountains. The Swartberg range owes some of its great height to upliftment along this fault line. The subsurface structures are not to scale.

The lava outpourings that ended the Karoo deposition of rocks, not only covered the African surface, and other parts of Gondwana with a 1.6 km (0.99 mi) thick layer basaltic lava, but it also forced its way, under high pressure, between the horizontal layers of sedimentary rocks belonging to the Ecca and Beaufort groups, to solidify into dolerite sills. The long vertical fissures through which the lava welled up solidified into dikes which resemble the Great Wall of China from the air. From about 150 million years ago the South African surface has been subjected to an almost uninterrupted period of erosion, particularly during the past 20 million years, shaving off many kilometers of sediments. This exposed the dolerite sills, which were more resistant to erosion than the Karoo sediments, forming one of the most characteristic features of the Karoo landscape, namely the flat-topped hills, called "Karoo Koppies".

=== Geology of the Klein Karoo ===
The geology of the Klein Karoo bears no resemblance to that of the Great Karoo (see the diagram on the left, of a NS geological cross-section through the Klein and Great Karoos). The valley is an integral part of the Cape Fold Mountain Belt, with the two ranges on either side composed of extremely hard, erosion-resistant, quartzitic sandstone belonging to the 450 to 510-million-year-old Table Mountain Group (i.e. the oldest layer of the Cape Supergroup). The valley floor is covered, in the main, by the next (younger) layer of the Supergroup, namely the much softer Bokkeveld shales. The dolerite of the Great Karoo did not penetrate these rocks, so Karoo Koppies are not seen in the Klein Karoo.

The Klein Karoo contains two other geological features that give the landscape a special character. During the erosion of the African interior following the bulging of the continent during the massive lava outpourings that ended the Karoo sedimentation 180 million years ago, some of the eroded material was trapped in the valleys of the Cape Fold Mountains, especially during the Cretaceous period, about 143 to 66 million years ago. These "Enon Conglomerates", as they are known, were deposited by high energy, fast flowing rivers, and are found between Calitzdorp and Oudtshoorn, where they form the strikingly red "Redstone Hills".

The second special geological feature that marks the Klein Karoo is the 300 km (190 mi) fault line along the southern edge of the Swartberg Mountains. The Swartberg Mountains were lifted up along this fault, to such an extent that in the Oudtshoorn region, the rocks that form the base of the Cape Supergroup are exposed. These are locally known as the Cango Group, but are probably continuous with the Malmesbury Group that forms the base of Table Mountain on the Cape Peninsula, and similar outcrops in the Western Cape. In the Klein Karoo, the outcrop is composed of limestone, into which an underground stream has carved the impressively extensive Cango Caves.

== Karoo flora ==
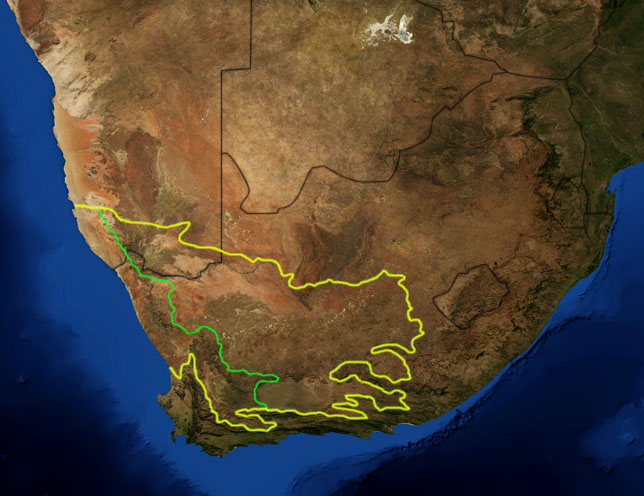
Two separate and independent Karoo biomes, or botanical regions, of South Africa bear the name Karoo: the Succulent Karoo to the west of green line, and the Nama Karoo to the east.

The World Wildlife Fund has classified the Great Karoo and Klein Karoo as almost entirely within two of what they consider South Africa's eight botanical biomes, they have coined their biomes succulent Karoo and the Nama Karoo, although both, like the geological Karoo Supergroup, are more extensive than the geographical or historical Karoo described in South African atlases and guide books (compare the map on the right with the map at the beginning of the article).

=== Succulent Karoo biome ===
The succulent Karoo biome runs along the West Coast, from approximately Lamberts Bay northwards to over 200 km into southern Namibia. It starts in the south just north of the sandveld geographical region, about 250 km north of Cape Town, and continues through Namaqualand, the Richtersveld, immediately south of the Orange River, and on into the Namaqualand or Namaland region of southern Namibia. None of these regions is ever referred to, either geographically or locally, as "Karoo". However, it has a major extension inland into the Tankwa Karoo and Moordenaarskaroo regions of the Lower Karoo, and adjoining Upper Karoo region of the geographic Great Karoo. It also occurs to the south, in part of the Breede River Valley, as the Robertson Karoo. From here, it continues eastwards into the western half of the Klein Karoo.

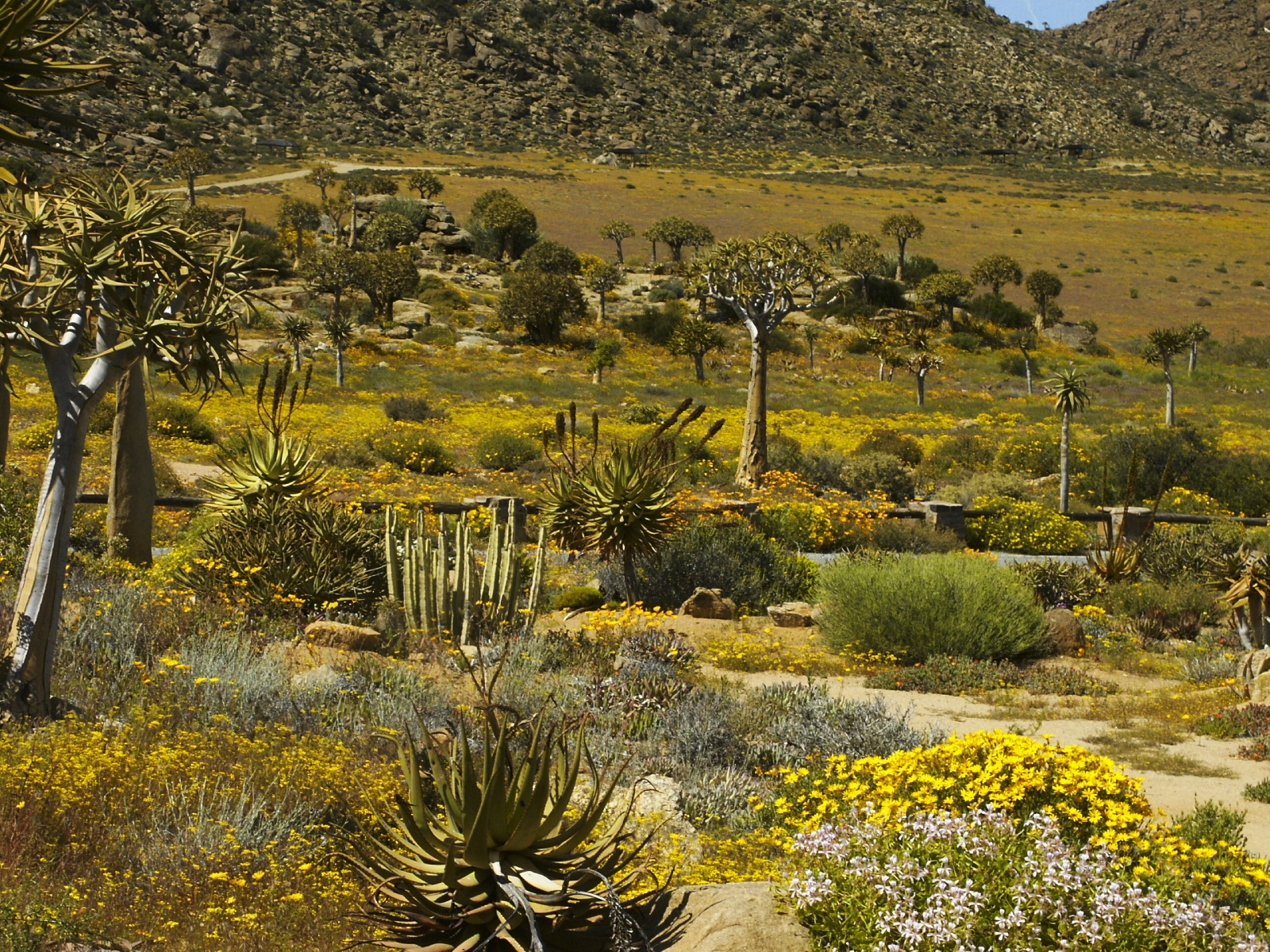
Spring flowers in Namaqualand

The succulent Karoo biome is dominated by dwarf, leafy-succulent shrubs, and annuals, predominantly Asteraceae, popularly known as Namaqualand daisies, which put on spectacular flower displays covering vast stretches of the landscape in the southern spring-time (August–September) after good rains in the winter. Grasses are uncommon, making most of the biome unsuitable for grazing. The low rainfall, in fact, discourages most forms of agriculture. An exception is the thriving ostrich-farming industry in the Klein Karoo, which is heavily dependent on supplementary feeding with lucerne. The difference between the succulent Karoo biome and the Nama Karoo biome is that the former receives the little rain that falls as cyclonic rainfall in winter, which has less erosive power than the infrequent but violent summer thunderstorms of the Nama Karoo. Frost is also less common in the succulent Karoo biome than in the Nama Karoo biome. The number of mainly succulent plant species is very high for an arid area of this size anywhere in the world.

=== Nama Karoo biome ===
The Nama Karoo biome is located entirely on the central plateau mostly at altitudes between 1000 and 1500 m. It incorporates nearly the whole of the historical and geographical Great Karoo, but also includes a portion of southern Namibia's Namaqualand, and South Africa's Bushmanland (both local geographical names, not names of biomes). It is the second-largest biome in South Africa, and forms the botanical transition between the fynbos biome to the south and the savannah biome to the north. It is defined primarily by the dominance of dwarf (less than 1 m high) shrubs with a co-dominance of grasses especially towards the north-east and east where it grades into the grassland biome of the highveld and the Eastern Midlands. The shrubs and grasses are deciduous, mainly in response to the irregular rainfall. Much of the Nama Karoo biome is used for sheep and goat farming, providing mutton, wool, and pelts for local and international markets, especially since livestock can frequently be provided with a regular supply of water from boreholes. Overgrazing exacerbates the erosion caused by the violent thunderstorms that occur, infrequently, in the summer. It also promotes the replacement of the grasses by shrubs, especially the less edible varieties such as the threethorn (Rhigozum trichotomum), bitterbos (Chrysocoma ciliata), and sweet thorn (Acacia karroo). However, there are few rare or Red Data Book plant species in the Nama Karoo biome.

== Karoo fauna ==
=== Great Karoo ===
The Great Karoo used to support a large variety of antelope (particularly the springbok), the quagga, and other large game, especially on the grassy flats in the east. Francois Le Vaillant, the famous French explorer, naturalist, and ornithologist, who traveled through the Great Karoo in the 1780s, killed a hippopotamus in the Great Fish River in the Karoo (and ate its foot for breakfast). He also recorded that he saw the spoor of a rhinoceros near Cranemere, in the Camdeboo Plains (eastern Lower Karoo). Elephant tusks have been found by farmers in the Camdeboo district, but no records exist of any having been seen alive in that region. The quagga roamed the Karoo in great numbers together with wildebeest and ostriches, which always seemed to accompany them. These quagga seemed gentle and easy to domesticate. (A pair of quagga was used to draw a horse carriage through London, more for curiosity than for any superiority the quagga might have had over a horse.) They were consequently also easy prey for hunters, who hunted them for sport rather than their meat. By the middle of the 1800s, they were almost extinct, and in 1883, the last one died in an Amsterdam zoo.

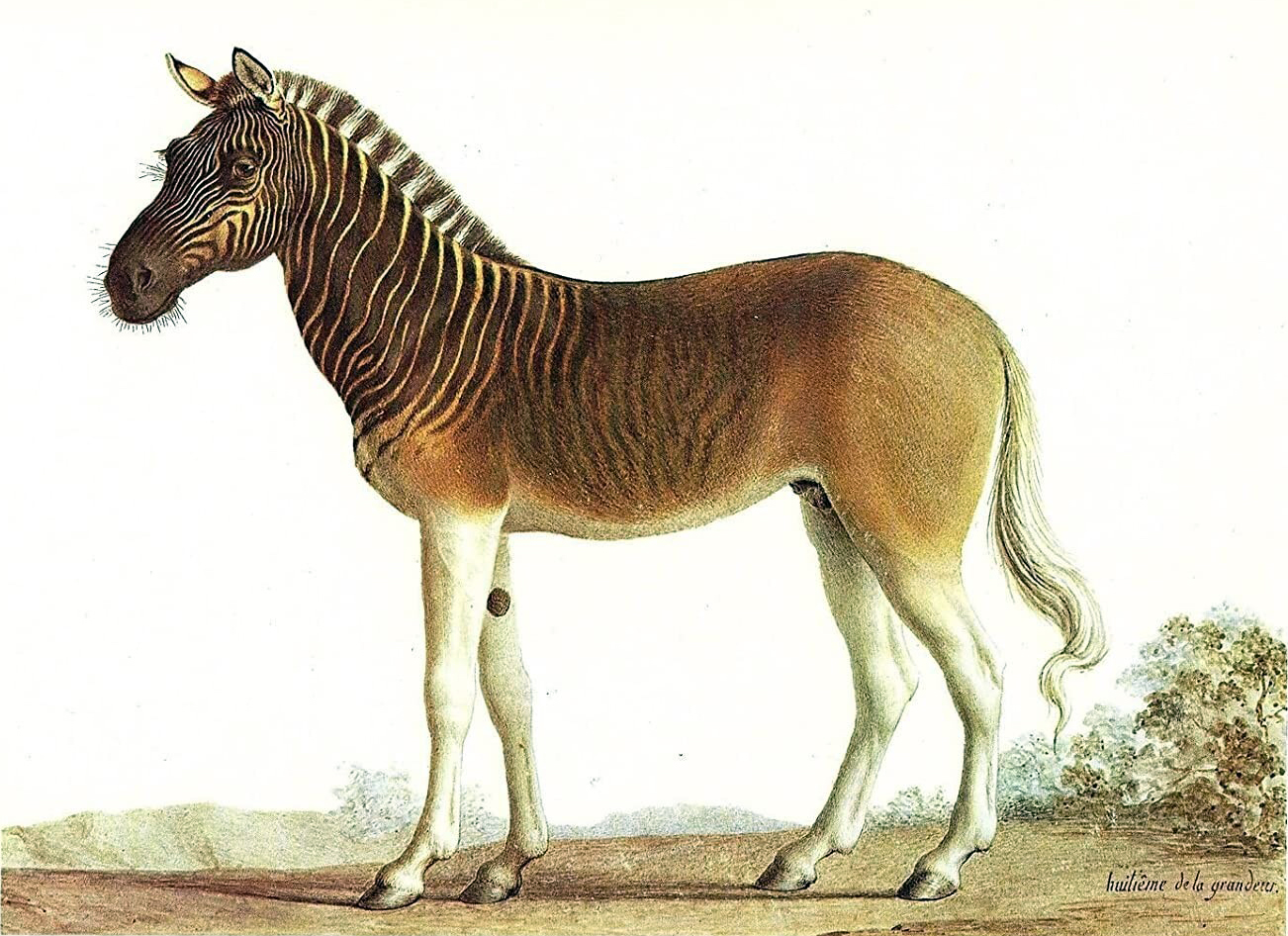
Painting of a quagga stallion in Louis XVI's menagerie at Versailles by Nicolas Marechal, 1793

Probably the strangest and most puzzling zoological phenomenon in the Great Karoo was the periodic, unpredictable appearance of massive springbok migrations. These migrations always came from the north, and could either go west towards Namaqualand and the sea, south-west through towns such as Beaufort West, or south through the Camdeboo district. These vast herds moved steadily and inexorably across the plains, trampling all before them, including their own kind. Le Vaillant gave the first eyewitness account of such a migration in 1782. He rode through the herd filling the Plains of Camdeboo, seeing neither the beginning nor end of the moving mass.

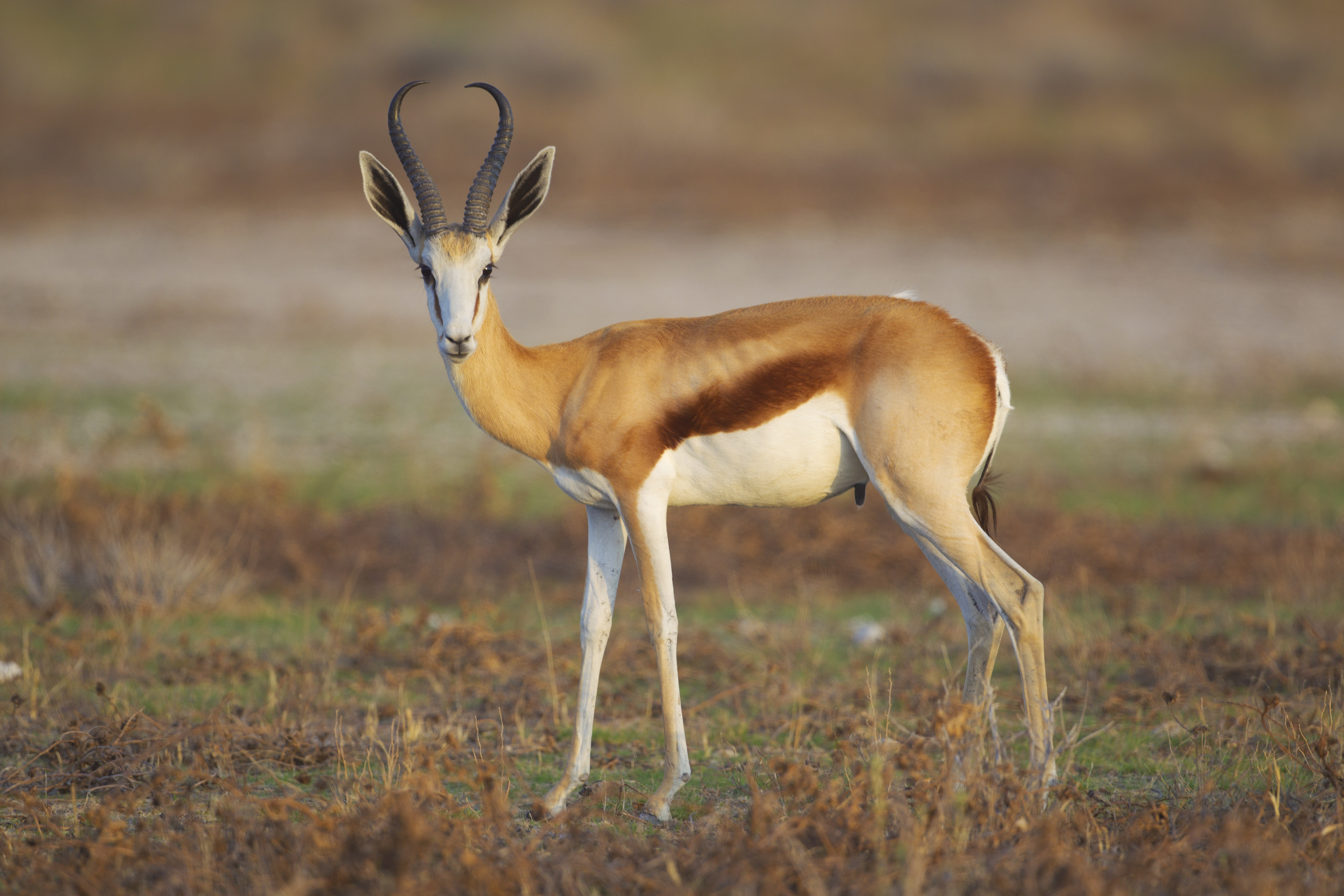
A springbok, one of Southern Africa's most well-known antelopes or gazelles

In 1849, a massive herd of springbok, amongst which were intermingled wildebeest, blesbok, quagga, and eland, moved through Beaufort West. Early one morning, the town was awakened to a sound like that of a strong wind, and suddenly the town was filled with animals. They devoured every sprig of foliage in the town and surrounding countryside. The last of the continuously moving herd left the town 3 days later, to disappear towards the west. The Karoo looked as if a fire had swept through it. During these migrations, the plains and hillsides on every side were thickly covered by one vast mass of springbok, packed like sheep in a fold. As far as the eye could see, the landscape was alive with them.

During these migrations, the springbok never ran or trotted. On the whole, they were silent, except for the shudder of their stamping hoofs. Nothing could divert them, and hunters could ride amongst them, shooting them at random, without apparently causing alarm. People could move amongst them and kill them with sticks, or cripple them by seizing a leg and breaking it. Not only people followed these herds for the easy meat they provided, but also lions, leopards, cheetahs, African wild dogs, hyenas, and jackals preyed on them.

No one knew how, why, or where these migrations started, nor where they ended, nor did anyone know if these animals ever returned to where they had started. The migrations were always unidirectional, from north of the Great Karoo.

Great locust swarms also frequently invaded or arose in the Great Karoo, and still occur from time to time today.

The riverine rabbit, a critically endangered animal, lives exclusively in seasonal river basins and a very particular set of scrubland in the central semiarid region in the Karoo. It is hunted by falconiformes and Verreaux's eagles. Its numbers have been consistently lowering due to destruction of its habitat. They are unique relative to similar species through how they are polygamous and how each female can only produce one or two offspring per year.

The introduction of the windpump to tap the Great Karoo's underground water resources in the late 1800s made permanent human habitation and sheep farming possible over large parts of the Great Karoo for the first time. As a result, the teeming number of large antelope in the Karoo has dwindled into insignificance, and with them, the large carnivores have all but disappeared. Today, the caracal (7–19 kg), black-backed jackal (6–10 kg), Verreaux's eagle (3.0–5.8 kg) and the martial eagle (3.0–6.2 kg) are arguably the largest predators likely to be seen in the Great Karoo today. Leopards (20–90 kg) do occur, especially in the mountains, but are very secretive, so are rarely seen. Many of the animals that formerly inhabited the Karoo in large numbers, including lions, have been reintroduced to the area in nature reserves and game farms.

=== Klein Karoo ===
As in the Great Karoo, antelope and other big game inhabited the Klein Karoo in the past. However, the dominant zebra was not the quagga, but the Cape mountain zebra, (Equus zebra zebra) which is adapted for life on rugged, mountainous terrain. Their hooves are harder and faster-growing than those of Burchell's zebra (Equus quagga burchellii), which lives on the plains. The two species are, therefore, rarely seen in the same habitat. The quagga is closely related to Burchell's zebra, and appears also to have been confined to the plains.

The mountain zebra occurred in the mountain regions of the Cape Fold Belt and along the southern portion of the Great Escarpment. Thus, they were endemic to, amongst others, the western Lower Karoo and the Klein Karoo. However, they were hunted to near extinction, leaving fewer than 100 individuals by the 1930s. Conservation efforts since then brought their numbers up to 1200 by 1998, mainly by concentrating these zebra in nature reserves and protected areas, the most well-known of these being the Mountain Zebra National Park near Cradock in the Great Karoo. Cape mountain zebras are still found in protected areas managed by Cape Nature, including the Kamanassie and Gamkaberg Nature Reserves.

The ostrich is found throughout Africa, but the most handsome specimens came from the Klein Karoo, where the dry weather, but plentiful water in the streams formed an ideal habitat for these large, flightless birds. Here, they grow to over 2 m in height, and weigh over 100 kg. The male's feathers have been prized by many cultures in Africa, Europe, and Asia over thousands of years. In the 1860s, a farmer in the Graaff-Reinet district was apparently the first person to demonstrate that the ostrich could successfully be domesticated, bred in captivity, and the eggs hatched in incubators, while still producing the magnificent feathers. This idea was quickly adopted by farmers in the Little Karoo, where they started growing lucerne as the birds' favorite food. During 1880, no less than 74,000 kg (163,000 lb) of feathers were exported, and in 1904, it passed the 210,000 kg (460,000 lb) mark.

The First World War brought about a slump in the ostrich feather market, but the industry recovered in later years, when not only the feathers were sought after, but also ostrich leather, and its meat, which is a major export item. Today, several farms can be visited by tourists, near Oudtshoorn, the center of the ostrich industry.

== Modern history ==
=== Great Karoo ===
The first European settlers landed in the Cape of Good Hope in 1652, and between 1659 and 1664, made several unsuccessful attempts to penetrate the Great Karoo from the south-west. The Europeans who first entered the Great Karoo did so from the south-east (traveling north from Algoa Bay), which is slightly less arid than the western Karoo. These were the trekboers of the mid-1700s, who led a nomadic existence, enduring great hardships in the relentless aridity, the intense heat (such that even their dogs could not walk on the scorching ground and had to be lifted into the overcrowded wagons), and the bitter cold in winter, especially at night. Before that time, the only inhabitants were the Khoe-speaking clans migrating through the area, and !Ui-speaking peoples, who lived in small family groups and, it is believed, remained largely in their own "territories", killing their own game, and gathering bulbs and roots and drinking from a spring or other water source within their territory. Sometimes these territories were very large and the family group moved from one part to the other. Their only domestic animals were dogs. The Ntu-speaking agriculturalists to the east of the Great Karoo did not occupy this arid region due to the scarce rainfall which prevented the farming of cattle.

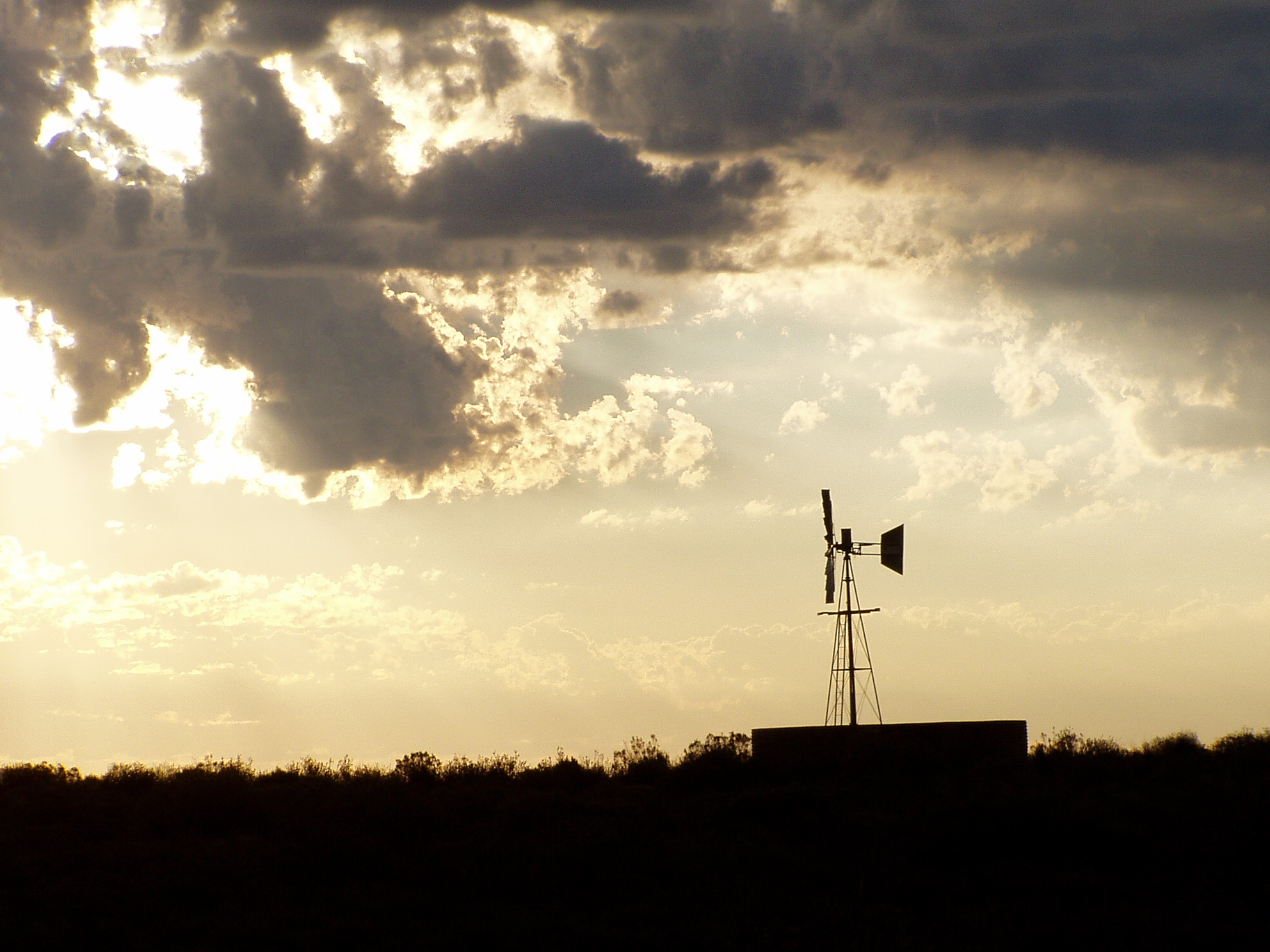
Sunset in the Great Karoo, near Sutherland, showing a multibladed windpump, which has made permanent settlement and farming possible in this thirsty land. These windpumps are as iconic of the Great Karoo as are the flat-topped Karoo Koppies.

In 1854, Daniel Halladay invented the multibladed windpump (windmill) in the USA. It was perfected in 1883, and soon South Africa (and elsewhere) produced them in large numbers. These windpumps transformed the Great Karoo, making permanent settlement and stock farming (predominantly sheep) possible over large parts of the Karoo for the first time. Like the Karoo Koppie, the multibladed windpump became an iconic feature of the Great Karoo. Sheep farming and the fencing off of the land have meant that antelope numbers have dwindled significantly, and with them, the big carnivores. Leopards still occur in the mountains, but lions now only occur in nature reserves, where they have been recently reintroduced into the Great Karoo.

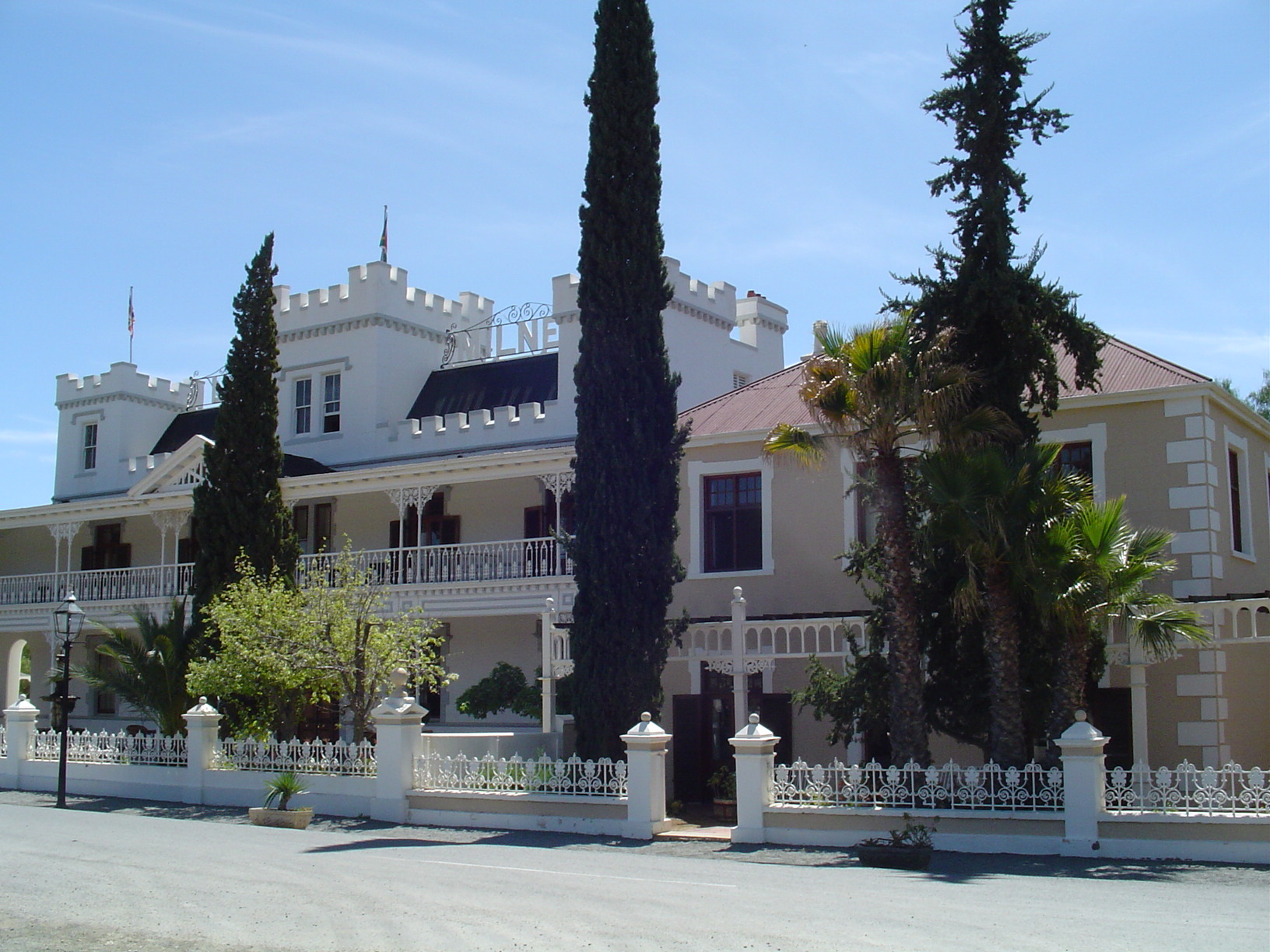
The Lord Milner Hotel in Matjiesfontein, in the Lower Karoo, next to the Matjiesfontein railway station, on the railway line from Cape Town to Johannesburg

In 1872, construction was started to connect the Cape Colony's coastal railway system with the diamond fields in Kimberley, The new line started in Worcester and entered the Lower Karoo through the Hex River valley, where it followed a course almost midway between the Swartberg Mountains to the south and the Great Escarpment to the north. Along the way, it passed through the quaint Victorian village of Matjiesfontein, with the historic Lord Milner Hotel, which is still operational today. The railway reached this point in 1878, before proceeding to Beaufort West at the foot of the Great Escarpment. From there, it reached the top of the African Plateau near Three Sisters along a valley with such a low gradient that passengers were (and still are) hardly aware that they were ascending the Great Escarpment. From there it continued through the Upper Karoo, to De Aar, and crossed the Orange River at Hopetown, where South Africa's first diamond, the Eureka Diamond, was found. The Orange River, at this point, forms the local unofficial boundary between the Great Karoo and the Highveld.

The line reached Kimberley in 1885, and has since been extended via Botswana (then Bechuanaland) to reach Zimbabwe and Zambia (when they were still known as South and North Rhodesia), and branch lines have been constructed to Namibia and Port Elizabeth through a hub at De Aar, in the Great Karoo. Further branch lines were later built from points further north to Bloemfontein, Durban, and, of course, to Johannesburg.

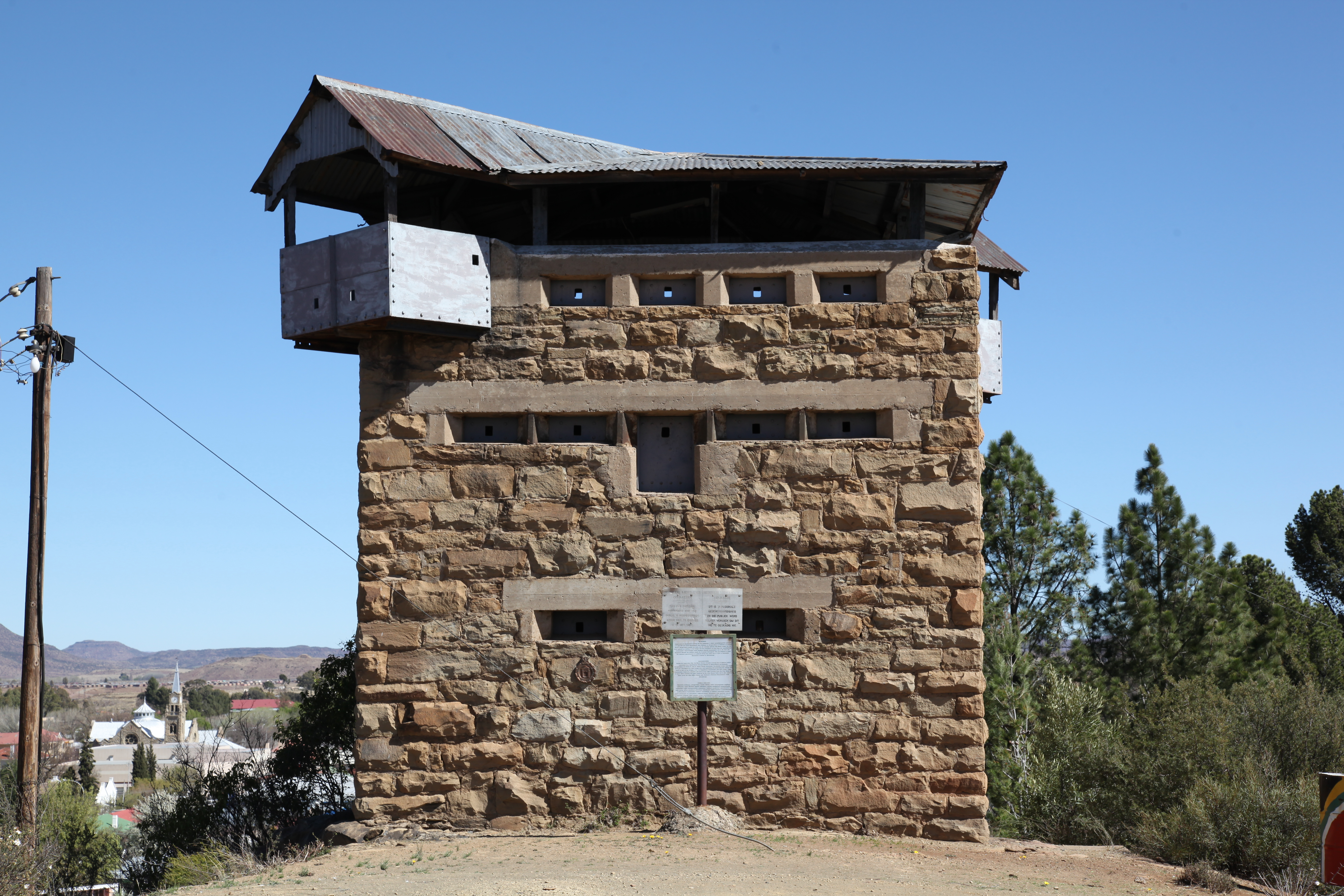
A blockhouse in the eastern Karoo

During the Second Anglo-Boer War of 1899–1902, three Republican commando units, reinforced by the sympathizers ("rebels") from the Cape Colony, conducted widespread operations throughout the Karoo. Countless skirmishes took place in the region, with the Calvinia magisterial district, in particular, contributing a significant number of fighters to the Republican cause. Fought both conventionally and as a guerrilla struggle over the Karoo's vast expanses, it was a bloody war of attrition wherein both sides used newly developed technologies to their advantage. Numerous abandoned blockhouses can still be seen at strategic locations, especially along the railway line, throughout the Great Karoo. A prime example still "guards" a bridge over the Buffels River, 12 km (7.5 mi) to the east of the town of Laingsburg, in the Lower Karoo, between Matjiesfontein and Beaufort West.

Recently, nature reserves and game farms have been established in many parts of the Great Karoo, turning what was once regarded as a forbiddingly desolate and unattractive geographical barrier into a tourist destination.

=== Klein Karoo ===
This area was explored by European settlers in the late 17th century, who encountered the Khoisan people as the original inhabitants of this area. The latter called the Swartberg Mountains kango meaning "a place rich in water". The Cango Caves in the Swartberg Mountains are named after this Khoisan word.

The Klein Karoo, and especially Oudtshoorn, became synonymous with the ostrich-feather industry in the 1880s. The resulting "feather millionaires" built Victorian "Feather Palaces" all over town, using the red rocks belonging to the Enon Conglomerate, and related Kirkwood Formation, to build them. These grand red palaces and other buildings in Oudtshoorn can still be admired today.

A railway line was built to connect Calitzdorp and Oudtshoorn, to Willowmore and from there, via Klipplaat, to Port Elizabeth, from where the ostrich feathers from the Klein Karoo's ostrich farms could be exported to Europe. That line is no longer in use today.

The Swartberg Pass was built, with convict labor, between 1881 and 1888 by Thomas Bain, son of the famous Andrew Geddes Bain, who built Bain's Kloof Pass and many others in the Western Cape. The main motivation for building the pass was to provide an all-weather road connection between the southern Great Karoo, and Oudtshoorn (and from there to the sea). The two alternative roads, through the Meiringspoort and the Seweweekspoort defiles, were subject to periodic flooding, after heavy thunderstorms in the Great Karoo. The Swartberg Pass is not tarred and can be treacherously slippery after rain. It also becomes impassable after heavy snowfalls on the mountain, a not infrequent occurrence in winter.

== Karoo in literature ==
Writer Olive Schreiner's internationally acclaimed novel The Story of an African Farm described life in the Karoo and detailed its landscapes, flora and fauna.

Poet Thomas Hardy wrote of the Karoo in his 1899 poem "Drummer Hodge" (or "The Dead Drummer").

Robert W. Service, in his poem "The Younger Son", imagines an emigrant at the end of a hard day: "A snow-peak of the Winterberg in crimson splendor gleams/The shadow deepens down on the karroo."

Rudyard Kipling, in his 1901 poem "Bridge-Guard in the Karroo", evoked the loneliness experienced by blockhouse soldiers at Ketting station on the Dwyka River while guarding the Karoo railway track, a lifeline during the South African War.

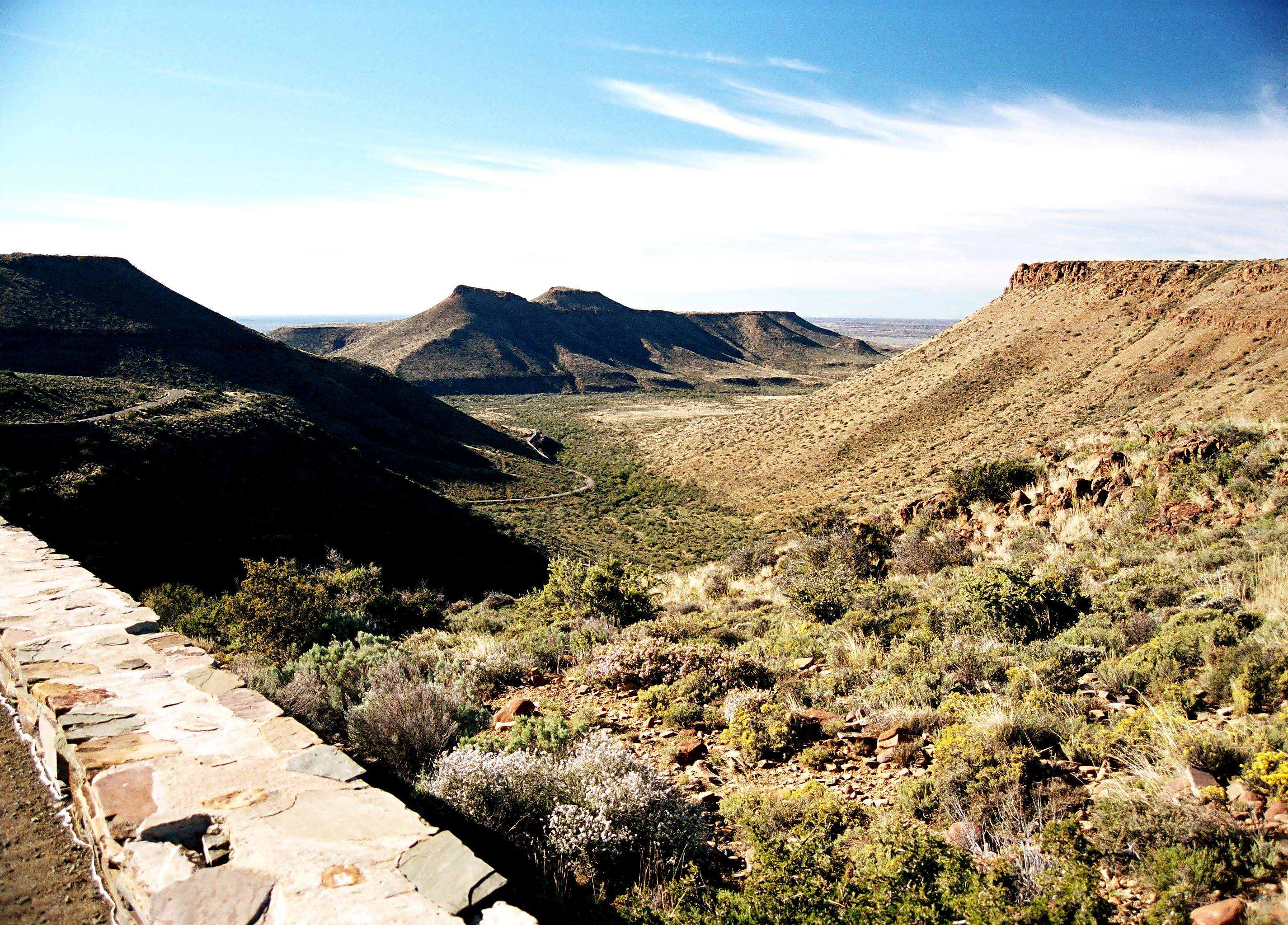
The Nuweveld Mountains near Beaufort West

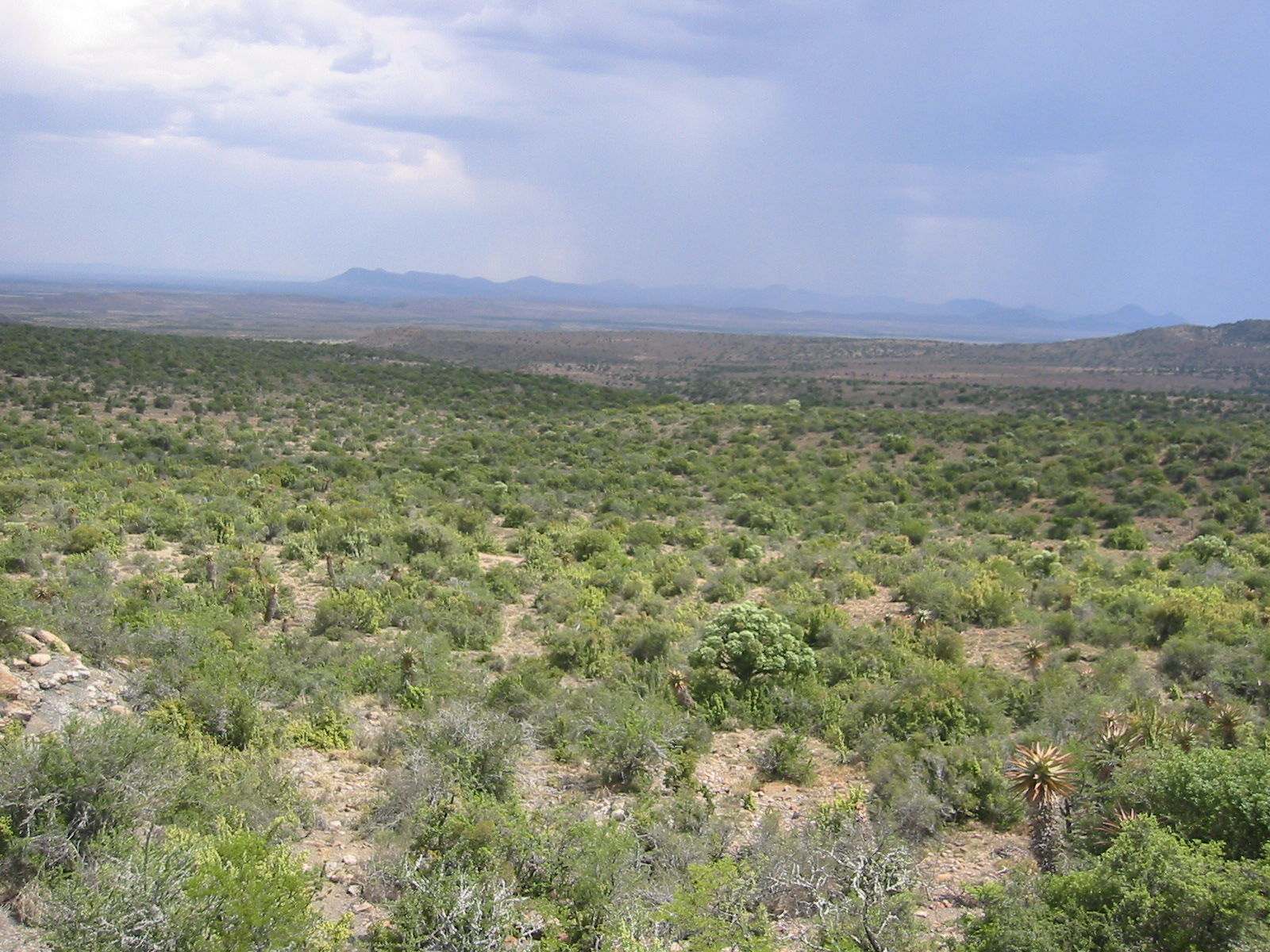
The Lower Karoo

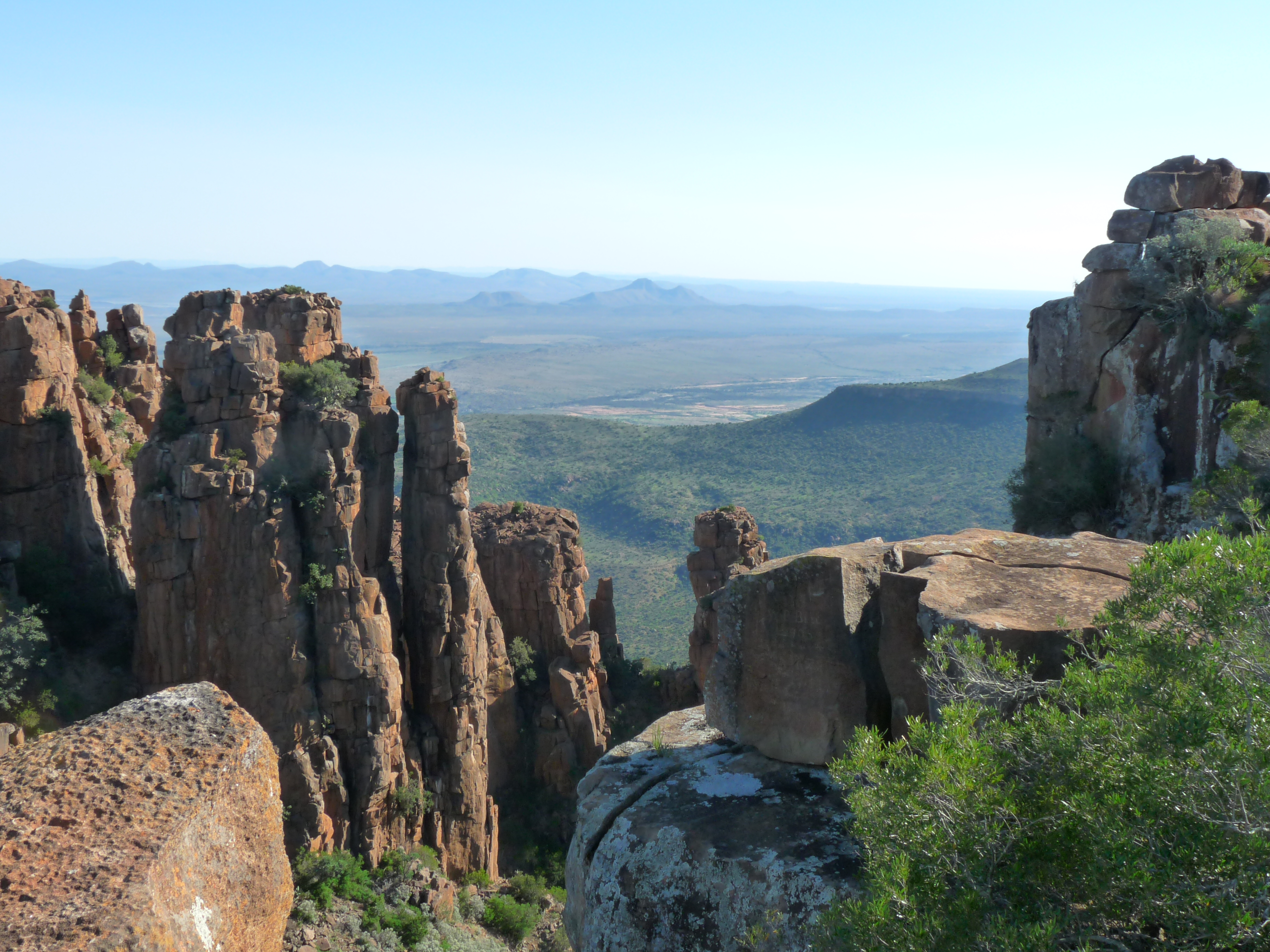
The Valley of Desolation near Graaff-Reinet

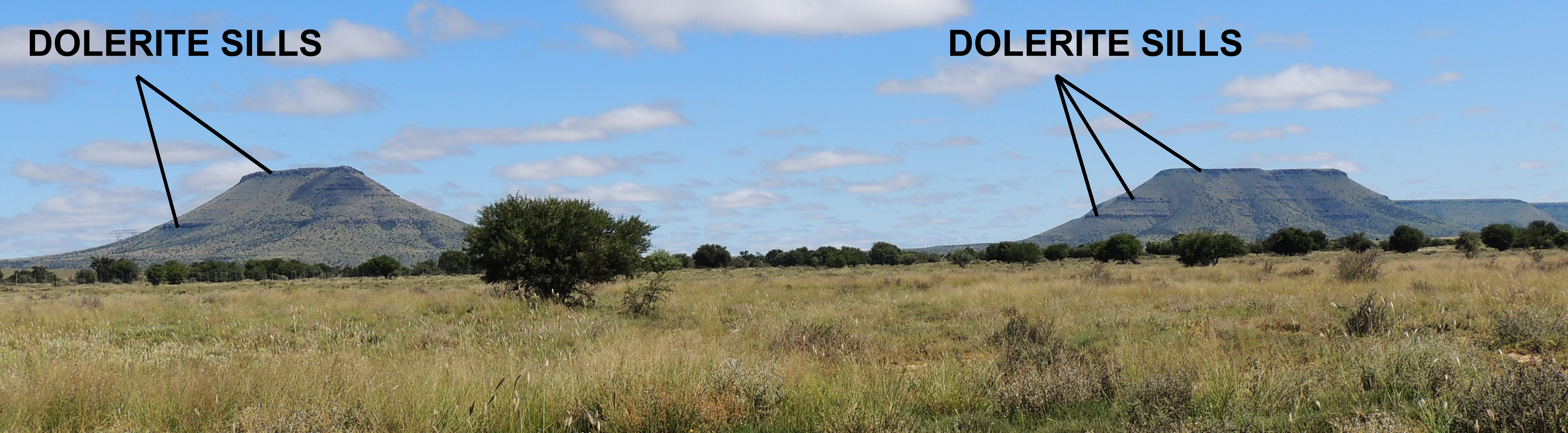
Typical Karoo koppies near Cradock

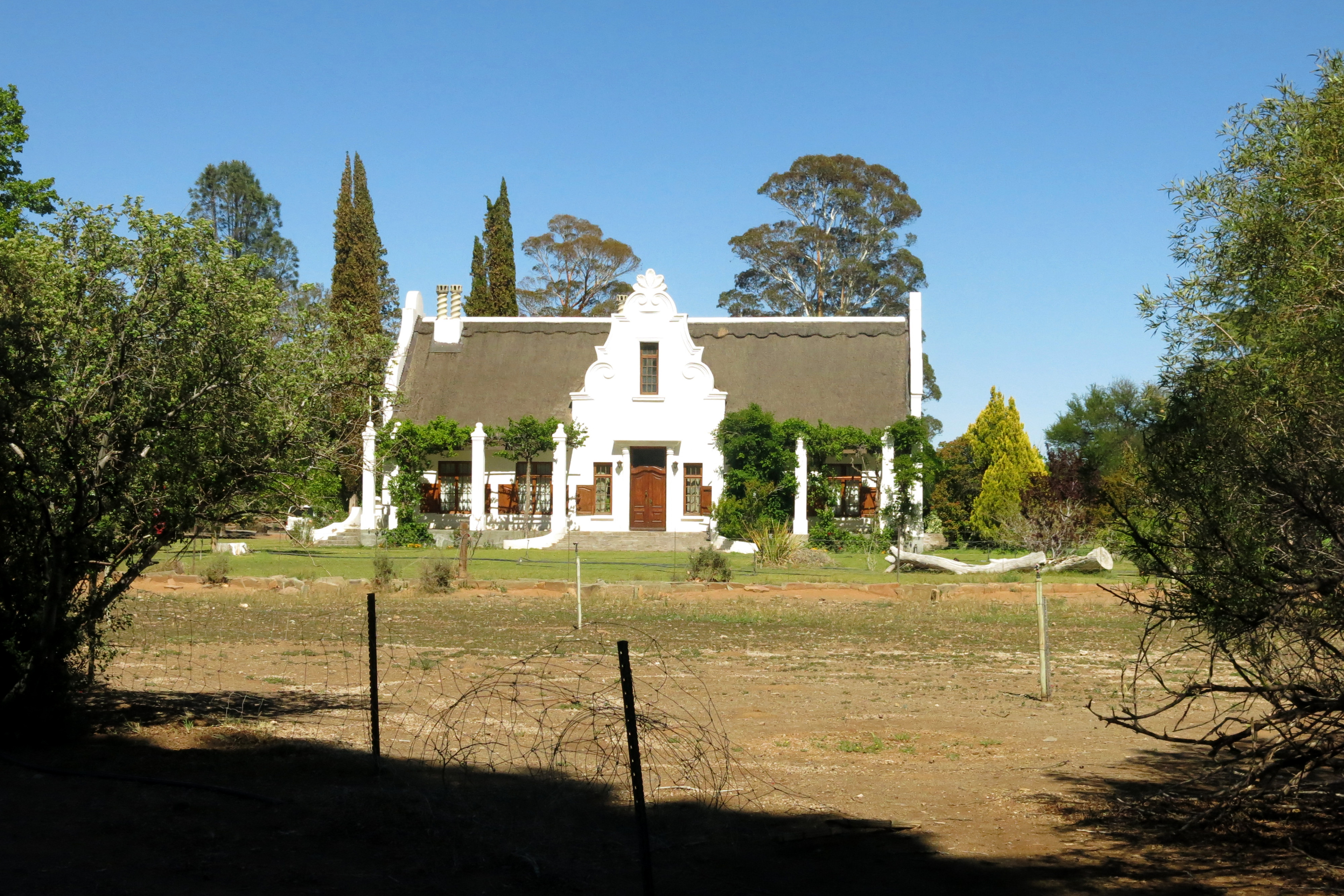
Farmhouse in the Tankwa Karoo

== See also ==
- People of the Karoo
- Karoo National Park
- Mountain Zebra National Park
- Camdeboo National Park
- Tankwa Karoo National Park
- Karoo District Municipality
- Central Karoo District Municipality
- Karoo Ice Age
