= De Rust =

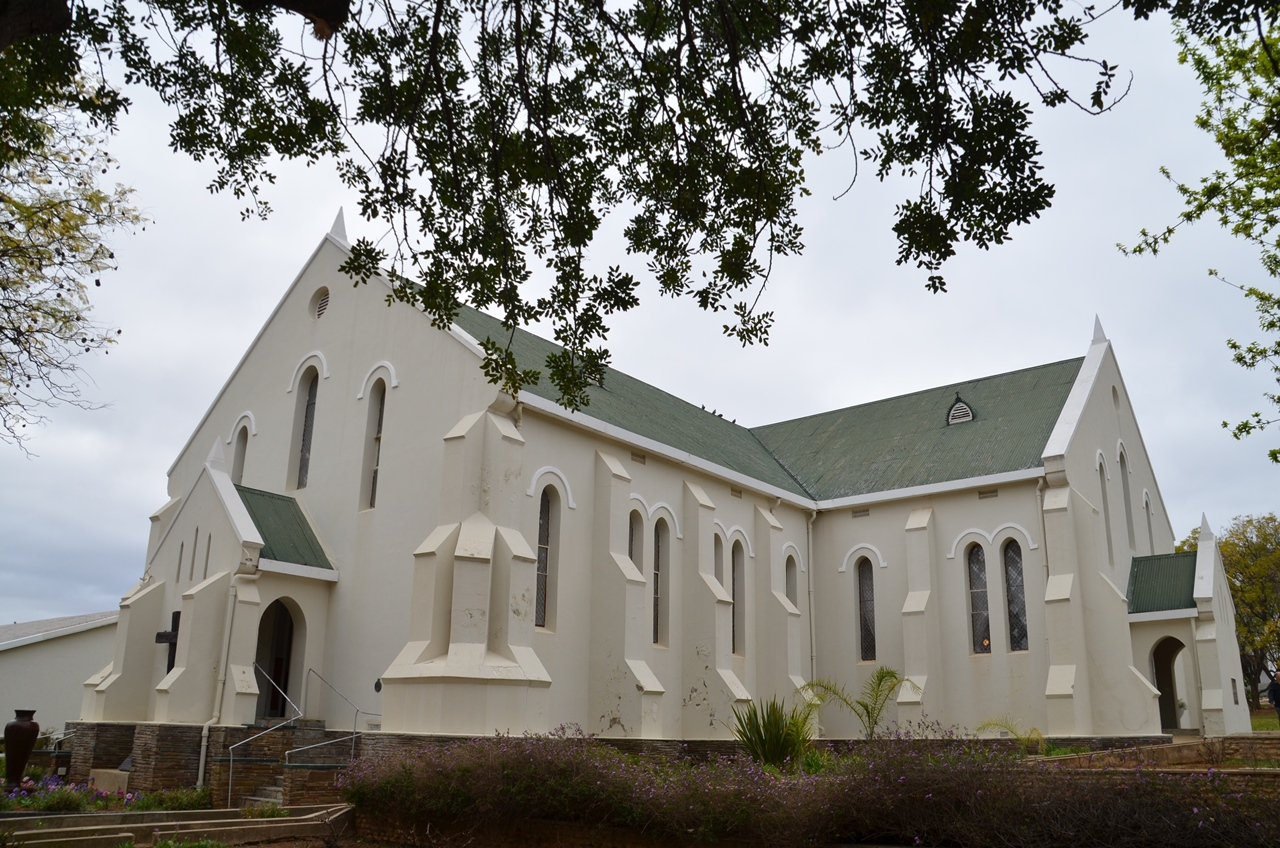
- De Rust Dutch Reformed Church

- Location within Western Cape Location within South Africa
- Coordinates: 33°29′20″S 22°32′00″E
- Country: South Africa
- Province: Western Cape
- District: Garden Route
- Municipality: Oudtshoorn

Area
  - Total: 17.63 km^{2} (6.81 sq mi)

Population (2011)
  - Total: 3,566
  - Density: 202.3/km^{2} (523.9/sq mi)

Racial makeup (2011)
  - Black African: 2.5%
  - Coloured: 87.4%
  - Indian/Asian: 0.5%
  - White: 8.9%
  - Other: 0.8%

First languages (2011)
  - Afrikaans: 93.6%
  - English: 4.1%
  - Other: 2.3%
- Time zone: UTC+2 (SAST)
- Postal code (street): 6651
- PO box: 6650
- Area code: 044

De Rust is a small village at the gateway to the Klein Karoo, South Africa. The name is Dutch and literally translates to "The Rest", referring to the town's original purpose of being a resting place for settlers en route through the challenging terrain of a nearby Swartberg gorge.

== Location ==
De Rust is located at the foot of the Swartberg Mountain range between Oudtshoorn and Beaufort West.

De Rust is also known for the meandering Meiringspoort pass. Meiringspoort is a gateway that connects the Klein Karoo (little Karoo) and the (great) Karoo through a gorge with a 25 km road crossing the same river 25 times in the span of the 25 km. The annual Meiringspoort half marathon runs through the length of the pass and finishes in De Rust.

== Climate ==
Climate data for De Rust
Month	Jan	Feb	Mar	Apr	May	Jun	Jul	Aug	Sep	Oct	Nov	Dec	Year
Mean daily maximum °C (°F)	28.3 (82.9)	28.2 (82.8)	26.4 (79.5)	23.4 (74.1)	20.1 (68.2)	17.9 (64.2)	17.4 (63.3)	18.8 (65.8)	20.5 (68.9)	22.7 (72.9)	24.7 (76.5)	26.9 (80.4)	22.9 (73.3)
Mean daily minimum °C (°F)	13.7 (56.7)	14.2 (57.6)	13.0 (55.4)	10.1 (50.2)	7.3 (45.1)	4.8 (40.6)	3.8 (38.8)	5.1 (41.2)	6.6 (43.9)	8.6 (47.5)	10.8 (51.4)	12.2 (54.0)	9.2 (48.5)
Average precipitation mm (inches)	25 (1.0)	31 (1.2)	39 (1.5)	31 (1.2)	36 (1.4)	23 (0.9)	28 (1.1)	29 (1.1)	32 (1.3)	32 (1.3)	36 (1.4)	26 (1.0)	368 (14.4)
Source: Climate-Data.org

== Farming ==
This area is also well known for ostrich farming and most of the farmers in the area either farm exclusively with ostriches or as a sideline to their existing farming.
