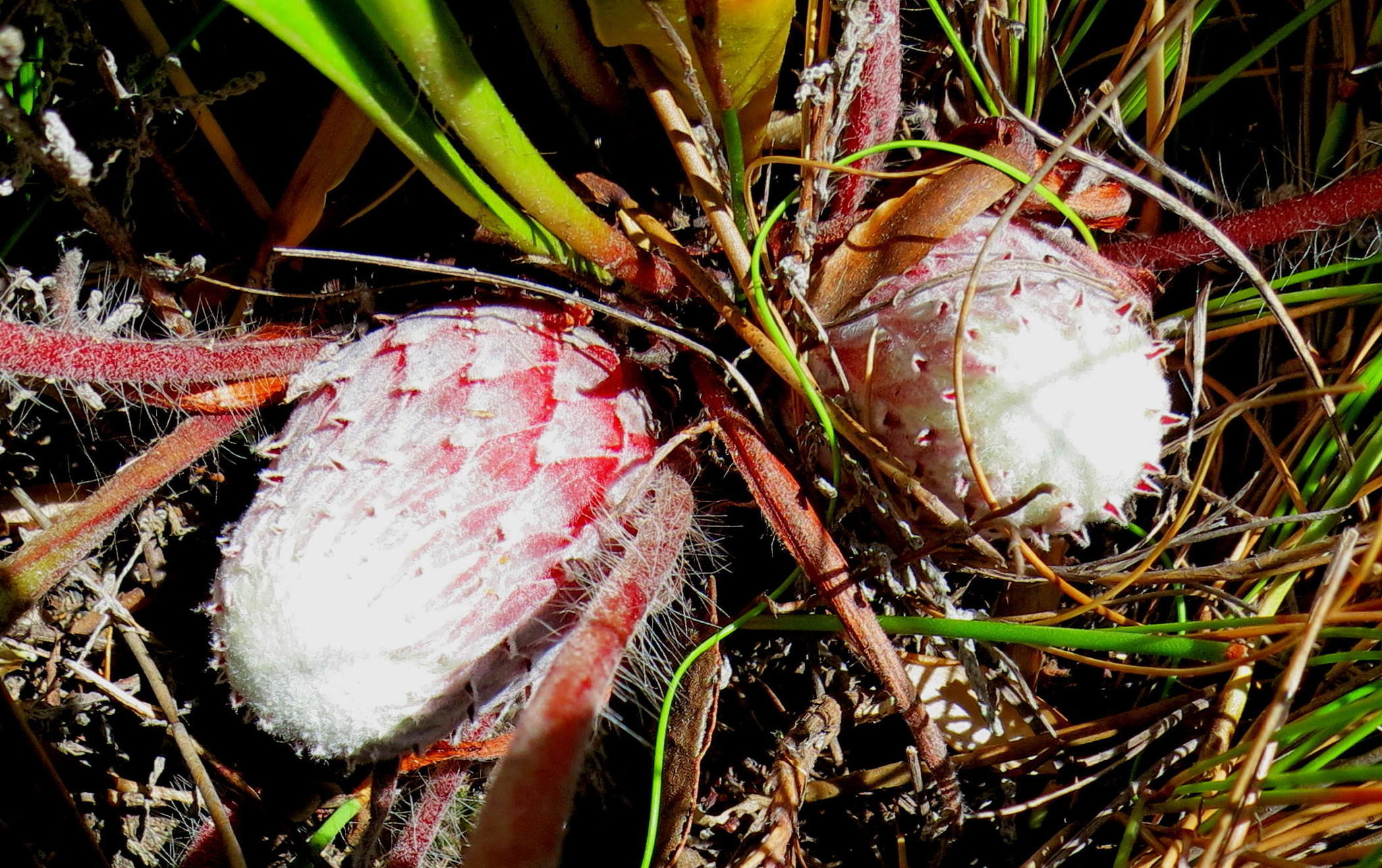

Conservation status
- Endangered (IUCN 3.1)

Scientific classification
- Kingdom: Plantae
- Clade: Embryophytes
- Clade: Tracheophytes
- Clade: Angiosperms
- Clade: Eudicots
- Order: Proteales
- Family: Proteaceae
- Genus: Protea
- Species: P. pruinosa

Binomial name
- Protea pruinosa Rourke

= Protea pruinosa =

Species of flowering plant

Protea pruinosa, also known as frosted sugarbush or burnished protea, is a flowering shrub which belongs to the genus Protea within the botanical family Proteaceae. The plant is endemic to the southwestern Cape Region of South Africa.

== Taxonomy ==
Protea pruinosa is one of the last species of Protea discovered by science. It was first discovered and collected in flower in January 1974 by the South African botanist John Patrick Rourke in the Klein Swartberg mountains at the head of a canyon, the Waterkloof, between the peaks of the Toringberg and the Koudeveldsberg, and it was subsequently featured and described as a new species in an article written by Rourke in the South African botanical magazine Flowering Plants of Africa in 1977. The article was illustrated with a painting by the botanical artist Fay Anderson. Rourke's original 1974 exsiccata specimens (Rourke#1406) were distributed over a number of herbaria in South Africa, Europe and the United States, with a specimen sheet in the Compton Herbarium in Cape Town designated as the holotype, and the other sheets as isotypes.

=== Etymology ===
The specific epithet is descriptive: The Latin word 'pruinosa' means 'frosty', and refers to the brilliant white, woolly outer surface of the bracts.

== Description ==
Protea pruinosa is a cushion-shaped prostrate shrub: it grows sprawling and flat on the ground, the stems forming a dense mat. It grows about 0.4 metres (1.3 ft) to 0.5 metres (1.6 ft) tall, and 1.5 metres (4.9 ft) in diameter. It grows slowly, reaching a reproductive age at some fifteen years of age, when the plant reaches a diameter of 30 centimetres (12 in).

The stems are short and stay flat on the ground. The thick, rigid leaves all point upwards, with their apex towards at the sky.

The flowers (florets) are clustered together in a structure called a 'pseudanthium', a special type of inflorescence, which is also called a 'flower head'. A mature P. pruinosa can produce up to seventeen of these flower heads in a season. When these inflorescences fully open they release a pleasant, yeasty scent. The flower head is surrounded by fleshy, petal-like appendages called 'involucral bracts'. These bracts have a white woolly indumentum on their outer surface, but their base and the inner surface is coloured a brilliant carmine. This colour pattern is opposite that of most rodent-pollinated proteas, which usually have flower heads with dark outer bract surfaces and a whitish centre. The plant is monoecious, both sexes appear in each flower.

Individual florets have a pistil with a single ovary, surrounded by four non-showy perianth lobes, each with a single, sessile anther at its apex. The style is extremely wiry, but tough and flexible. This style both offers the pollen for distribution as well as accepts it from pollinators. Before the floret opens, the sticky pollen is deposited on a special grooved area near the end of the style, known as the 'pollen-presenter'. The stigma, where the pollen must go, is an extremely small, microscopic groove or slit at the very tip of the style. The floret is structured in such a way as to require that the pollen be physically transported to the stigma, presumably to promote outcrossing, despite the short distance between the stigma and the pollen presenter on the style and the fact that proteas appear to be self-compatible (although many protea are dichogamous/protandrous, the pollen remains viable for several days). As the flower bud grows, but before the flower opens (anthesis), the base of the style swells and eventually ruptures through the perianth. Anthesis, when the anthers and perianth unfold and the style is exserted, is mildly explosive. In rodent-pollinated proteas such as this one, three of the perianth lobes are united and form a reservoir which holds the nectar. These reservoirs may spill and the nectar can pool further below, usually in between the bracts.

=== Similar species ===
Protea pruinosa shares its habitat with two other species of rodent-pollinated proteas, these three each flower at different periods, which helps ensuring that the nectar-feeding rodents dwelling high up in these mountains are able to access these sources of food more or less continuously (there is an interruption during the spring, when there are no flowering proteas here), helps maintaining the reproductive isolation of the three species, as well as reduce competition for pollinators between the species. P. scolopendriifolia is the first species to bloom, thereafter followed by P. pruinosa, and lastly by P. montana. This situation is common among sympatric rodent-pollinated proteas.

== Distribution ==
92% of all the Protea species are found in South Africa, and this species is among them. It is endemic to the Western Cape province of South Africa, only occurring on the tops of mountains of the Swartberg Mountains bordering the Little Karoo to the north, from the Towerkop to Meiringspoort (a mountain pass). As of 1993, there were only six known locations where this species grew, and five of these populations occur on the Klein Swartberg Mountains rising above the Karoo just to the north of the village of Ladismith.

== Ecology ==
=== Habitat ===
The species only grows in a single specific type of habitat, called 'Swartberg altimontane sandstone fynbos'. It grows on the snow-clad ridges and the summits of mountains, where it is usually found growing on the occasional level areas, among rocks, at altitudes of 1,800 to 2,100 or 2,150 metres (in the original 1977 description). This is an area of Africa that regularly experiences snowfall, blizzards and harsh gales, where the topsoil is frozen from July to October, and where the ancient, infertile ground has had its nutrients leached and eroded out. It grows in quite deep soils which were derived from Table Mountain Sandstone. Lightning often strikes the mountains, and these strikes often cause wildfires. Wildfires usually occur every ten years or so in this region, although the plants are expected to require a longer period to reach a reproductive age. Although the plants are killed when fires pass through their land, the old flower heads remain intact and well-preserved for five to eight years afterward; the fires expose them when the leaves are immolated, and these large, charred discs are found between the clefts in the rocks of the montane landscape.

=== Life cycle ===
The wildfires which periodically burn through the natural habitat of this species destroy the adult plants, but the seeds are able to survive such an event. Death after fires is quite comprehensive: of 239 plants investigated after being caught in a wildfire, only one survived; even the plants which were only lightly singed and initially attempted to re-sprout soon died. However, because their habitat is so rocky and inhospitable, fires are commonly unable to completely destroy all the plants in a particular population, typically 2–27% of the population survives. Despite this, the species germinates best on those spots where fires have reduced the competing vegetation to ash lying on the bare ground, as opposed to more rocky places where it might be protected.

It blooms in the summer, from January to February. Rodents pollinate the flowers, and are attracted to the yeasty scent of the flowers. Acomys subspinosus, Aethomys namaquensis, Myomyscus verreauxii, Rhabdomys pumilio and Elephantulus edwardii have often been caught around rodent-pollinated proteas, and all foraged upon the flower heads in a laboratory setting. E. edwardii, which is in fact not a rodent but an elephant shrew, only licked the tops of the flower heads, but is thought to thus likely pollinate the florets anyway. Aethomys was the most quick to forage. Mus minutoides, Crocidura spp., Graphiurus ocularis and Dendromus melanotis have also been captured on rare occasion around rodent-pollinated proteas. Rodent pollinators' faeces contain a large amount of protea pollen, also as seen from their, probably due to being ingested during the grooming of their snouts. Rodent pollinators may also sometimes nibble on the bracts and styles of flower heads, destroying a percentage of the structure on a number of inflorescences, the diurnal mouse Rhabdomys pumilio appears to be most likely responsible for this. As imaged using fluorescent powders on the flower heads, the movement of pollinating rodents through the landscape creates small trails or runways, which often go from protea to protea. The flower heads tend to accumulate the faeces of their visiting rodents.

It is possible that this species is dependent on the two other species of rodent-pollinated proteas with which it shares its habitat and sometimes even grows alongside (P. scolopendriifolia and P. montana), as its population on its own may be too restricted to support the nectar-feeding rodents, although research by Wiens et al. found that the amount of nectar produced by a particular population is only sufficient to sustain the rodents for several days a year. The nectar is extremely sweet, which attracts the rodents, but it also low in protein and not very nutritious, and functions more like 'junk-food' or candy. Rodents in captivity which were fed a diet of only nectar died after five days. Individual pollinators have small home ranges of only 25 to 60 m^{2} (270 to 650 sq ft), but the distribution of pollinating species does not match that of the proteas. Specific pollinating species are not unique to this plant species, and are not even unique to this plant group, region or habitat, occurring across large parts of Africa. There is evidence that the specific rodent pollinator species at a specific group of plants may be different from a neighbouring group, and the abundance of certain particular species at a site may change drastically from year on year, likely because the rodent composition is dependent on other factors besides the proteas. Rodents captured in areas where there are no rodent-pollinated proteas, even species such as gerbils (Gerbilliscus afra) which are not known as nectar-feeders, are readily attracted to the rodent-pollinated protea flower heads as opposed to those of bird-pollinated proteas when experimentally exposed to both. Taken together, Wiens et al. thus surmise that while the proteas have evolved to accommodate the rodents, the rodents are not dependent on the proteas and have thus not specifically co-evolved to take advantage of the flowers, as seen in the relationships created with plants that have insects, birds or bats as pollinators. Protea species such as this one which have evolved from bird-pollination to then specialise in rodent-pollination may have done so in part due to ever-decreasing population sizes over many millennia, or perhaps following rhizomatous adaptions to fire. There are also no flower-feeding bats in this southern region of Africa.

The flower heads are bourne at ground level, in order to facilitate access for rodents. The styles are stiff and wiry, but still flexible and robust enough to withstand rough treatment. These styles act to maintain a distance of some 10 mm between the nectar sources and the stigma, which is the best 'fit' for the styles to rub across the rodents' snouts, on which pollen accumulates. It has also been theorised that this and other similar species have their flower heads hidden out of sight below tangles of branches and foliage for two reasons: first, it does not need to display its flowers for sight-dependent birds or insects to better find them, and second, because it affords visiting rodents better protection from predators, especially owls. Cryptic flower heads which are hidden also reduce 'nectar-robbing' which some bird species engage in. Other aspects of this pollination syndrome are the scent, the relatively copious amounts of nectar produced, bowl-shaped flower heads on short peduncles, the high sucrose and low protein content of the nectar and the anthesis (flower-opening) occurring during the night. Most flowers open in the evening from 18:00 to 21:00, which is also the period of peak rodent activity. Nectar secretion also appears to be stimulated by cold nights, and perhaps no rainfall, with no nectar being produced during the day and on warm nights. The scent is carried in the nectar and also appears to become stronger at night. The styles and nectar reservoirs are positioned in such a way that foraging can be done from all angles except from the centre of the head outward.

Chacma baboons, either to take the nectar or to search for beetles, are thought to be responsible for decapitated and destroyed flower heads, at least in similar species, and often concentrate such heads in small piles. Birds are extremely infrequent visitors to rodent-pollinated proteas. Within the flower heads a large amount of insects can be encountered, especially beetles, ants and flies -these likely predate on the nectar and pollen although they likely also serve as much less effective incidental pollinators: in an experiment with similar species in which rodents were kept away from the flowers by wire mesh, which did let in insects, seed set was about half the normal amount. Honey bees are poor pollinators of this type of protea, although they usually harvest large amounts of nectar. The large scarab beetle Anisonyx ursus may on occasion occur in flower heads in large numbers. It is possible that some species of rodent-pollinated proteas make more or less use of bees and/or beetles as pollinators than do others.

Individual plants take some fifteen years before their first flower head to appear, and afterwards flower only once every three years, until they reach eighteen to twenty years of age, after which they may begin to flower every year. Although large plants produce much more, on average a mature individual will only produce 1.17 flower heads a year. Because plants take so long to mature, and, like practically all plants, only a limited amount of seedlings survive, so it is estimated that at least six ripe seed heads (infructescences) are needed to replace a plant, and that thus on average an individual plant must reach an age of over two decades for the species to be able to sustain adequate recruitment.

The fruit (an achene) is stored in the old, dried, fire-resistant, woody infructescence, which remains on the plant for many years. The seed is stored in a closed capsule, and is only released after a long interval, after the infructescence is opened by fires. These infructescences are hidden amongst the dense foliage when the plants are alive, but when this is burnt away, the infructescences open, and only then are the seeds freed. When released, the seeds are dispersed by being blown away by the winds to a new site potentially advantageous for germination. The seeds require a period of freezing temperatures to break dormancy. Most seeds germinate during the cold of the first winter after a fire, although some may do so the following season. Although an inflorescence contains many hundreds of florets, in proteas seed set in commonly very low, around 10%, or usually less than two dozen seeds. Most proteas experience only little incidence of insect seed predation.

== Uses ==
This is an extremely difficult species to cultivate in areas with less frigid climates. The seeds require a period of stratification in order to germinate, and the plants appear to need a cold winter dormancy period.

== Conservation ==
The conservation status of this species was first listed as 'vulnerable' in a 1980 book, but in 1996 the South African National Biodiversity Institute (SANBI) assessed Protea pruinosa as being 'rare' for the Red List of South African Plants. Already in the 1990s this species was considered to only exist in the wild as a few isolated populations. SANBI reassessed the species in 2009 and upgraded its status to 'endangered', an assessment that was repeated in 2019.

In 1993 it was estimated that the total number of mature plants in the wild was less than a thousand individuals, although the numbers were thought to be stable, with recruitment of new seedlings being equal to those which die during fires. In the period from 1999 to 2001 some 10% of the total population died, possibly due to drought. In 2019 the total numbers of the population of this species were thought to be decreasing for unknown reasons. It is possible that the decline observed over the last thirty or so years may be related to the age of the veld, i.e. the fire regime, although that is speculation. As a serotinous 're-seeder', a species which has adapted to periodic wildfires which destroy the plants by surviving as fire-proof seeds which can then take advantage of the newly cleared and fertilised area to sprout, P. pruinosa may be sensitive to an increased fire frequency in the Swartberg mountains.
