= Anisonyx proletarius =

Scientific classification
- Kingdom: Animalia
- Phylum: Arthropoda
- Clade: Pancrustacea
- Class: Insecta
- Order: Coleoptera
- Suborder: Polyphaga
- Infraorder: Scarabaeiformia
- Family: Scarabaeidae
- Genus: Anisonyx
- Species: A. proletarius

Binomial name
- Anisonyx proletarius Péringuey, 1902

Species of beetle

Anisonyx proletarius is a species of beetle of the family Scarabaeidae. It is found in South Africa (Western Cape).

== Description ==
Adults reach a length of about 8–9 mm (0.31–0.35 in). They are similar in shape to Anisonyx nasuus, although a little more robust. They are also scaleless, but the elytra are brick-red and not infuscate laterally, the hairs on the head and pronotum are denser and darker, and the hairs on the elytra are more erect.
