= Erica astroites =

Scientific classification
- Kingdom: Plantae
- Clade: Tracheophytes
- Clade: Angiosperms
- Clade: Eudicots
- Clade: Asterids
- Order: Ericales
- Family: Ericaceae
- Genus: Erica
- Species: E. astroites

Binomial name
- Erica astroites Guthrie & Bolus

Species of flowering plant

Erica astroites is a plant belonging to the genus Erica and forming part of the fynbos. The species is endemic to the Western Cape and is rare. It is found only in Meiringspoort in the Swartberg where it grows on cliffs and near waterfalls.
