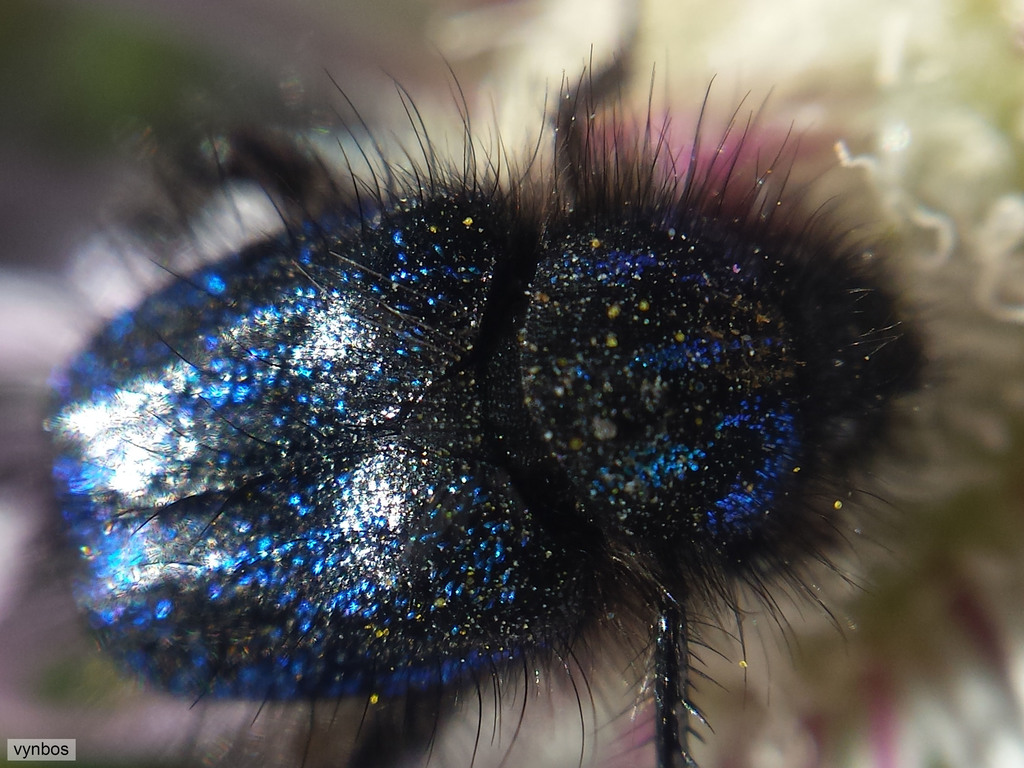

Scientific classification
- Kingdom: Animalia
- Phylum: Arthropoda
- Clade: Pancrustacea
- Class: Insecta
- Order: Coleoptera
- Suborder: Polyphaga
- Infraorder: Scarabaeiformia
- Family: Scarabaeidae
- Genus: Anisonyx
- Species: A. ditus

Binomial name
- Anisonyx ditus Péringuey, 1902

= Anisonyx ditus =

Species of beetle

Anisonyx ditus, the glittering monkey beetle, is a species of beetle of the family Scarabaeidae. It is found in South Africa (Western Cape).

== Description ==
Adults reach a length of about 8–9.5 mm (0.31–0.37 in). They closely resemble Anisonyx longipes, and are also covered with green scales, but these scales have a golden sheen. The elytra are testaceous, and are often so closely clothed with green scales that the background is not visible. The head is covered with scales. Furthermore, instead of five narrow bands of green scales, there is a very broad lateral band on the pronotum, divided obliquely at the base by a narrow black band, and a median narrow one. The scales on the elytra are almost contiguous, and the pygidium and abdomen are entirely covered with golden green scales.

== Subspecies ==
- Anisonyx ditus ditus
- Anisonyx ditus pseudoditus Schein, 1959
- Anisonyx ditus splendens Andreae, 1965
