= Anisonyx gemmeus =

Scientific classification
- Kingdom: Animalia
- Phylum: Arthropoda
- Clade: Pancrustacea
- Class: Insecta
- Order: Coleoptera
- Suborder: Polyphaga
- Infraorder: Scarabaeiformia
- Family: Scarabaeidae
- Genus: Anisonyx
- Species: A. gemmeus

Binomial name
- Anisonyx gemmeus Péringuey, 1902

Species of beetle

Anisonyx gemmeus is a species of beetle of the family Scarabaeidae. It is found in South Africa (Western Cape).

== Description ==
Adults reach a length of about 9–10 mm (0.35–0.39 in). They are black, with the elytra pale testaceous. The shape of the body is similar to that of Anisonyx hilaris, but the pronotum is less densely hairy, and the black hairs are mixed in the dorsal part with white ones. The five bands, instead of being sapphire, are opaline with a golden sheen. The scutellum has no scales. The elytra, in addition to the fuscous-black hairs, bear a few seriate, erect, white ones. These are longer but as numerous as the black erect ones, and there is along the suture a narrow band of golden, opaline scales, a very much broader one along the outer margin, and a few scales along the base. The propygidium and pygidium are clothed with long, black and white hairs, and are set with numerous scales which are also somewhat abundant on the abdomen.
