= Xanthoparmelia effigurata =

Scientific classification
- Kingdom: Fungi
- Division: Ascomycota
- Class: Lecanoromycetes
- Order: Lecanorales
- Family: Parmeliaceae
- Genus: Xanthoparmelia
- Species: X. effigurata

Binomial name
- Xanthoparmelia effigurata Hale (1986)

Species of lichen

Xanthoparmelia effigurata is a species of saxicolous (rock-dwelling), foliose lichen in the family Parmeliaceae. Found in Southern Africa, it was formally described as a new species in 1986 by the American lichenologist Mason Hale. The type specimen was collected from Cape Province at an elevation of 690 m (2,260 ft), where it was found growing on schist ledges on a hillside near Meiringspoort. The lichen has a firm and leathery, pale yellowish-green thallus that grows up to 6–12 cm (2.4–4.7 in) in diameter. It comprises more or less linear lobes that are 1.5–2.5 mm wide and branched dichotomously. It contains the secondary metabolites (lichen products) salazinic acid and usnic acid, sometimes with trace amounts of norstictic acid.

== See also ==
- List of Xanthoparmelia species
