= Anisonyx elizabethae =

Scientific classification
- Kingdom: Animalia
- Phylum: Arthropoda
- Clade: Pancrustacea
- Class: Insecta
- Order: Coleoptera
- Suborder: Polyphaga
- Infraorder: Scarabaeiformia
- Family: Scarabaeidae
- Genus: Anisonyx
- Species: A. elizabethae

Binomial name
- Anisonyx elizabethae Péringuey, 1902

Species of beetle

Anisonyx elizabethae is a species of beetle of the family Scarabaeidae. It is found in South Africa (Western Cape).

== Description ==
Adults reach a length of about 7.5 mm (0.30 in). They are very similar to Anisonyx pauperatus, but the whole body is clothed with black hairs, and the elytra alone are sprinkled with blue scales. In shape, they are also slightly shorter than A. pauperatus.
