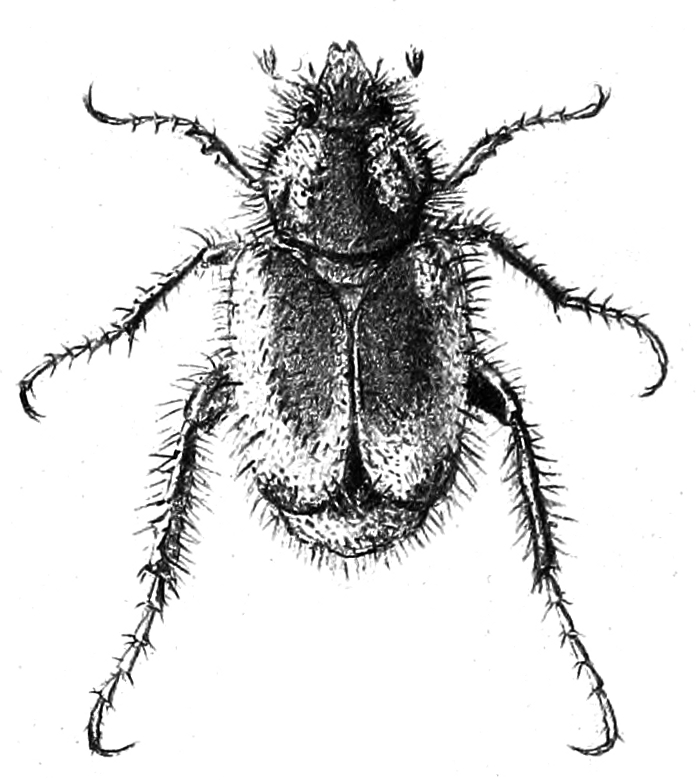

Scientific classification
- Kingdom: Animalia
- Phylum: Arthropoda
- Clade: Pancrustacea
- Class: Insecta
- Order: Coleoptera
- Suborder: Polyphaga
- Infraorder: Scarabaeiformia
- Family: Scarabaeidae
- Genus: Anisonyx
- Species: A. ignitus

Binomial name
- Anisonyx ignitus Laporte, 1840

= Anisonyx ignitus =

Species of beetle

Anisonyx ignitus is a species of beetle of the family Scarabaeidae. It is found in South Africa (Western Cape).

== Description ==
Adults reach a length of about 9.5–10 mm (0.37–0.39 in). They are black, clothed along the sides of the head and on the pronotum with long, dense black hairs. There are also two lateral bands of glowing, coppery red, minute scales on the pronotum. The elytra, except for a median patch reaching from the base to past the middle, and the propygidium, pygidium and abdomen, are clothed with similar scales. The antennae and legs are black.
