= Anisonyx brincki =

Scientific classification
- Kingdom: Animalia
- Phylum: Arthropoda
- Class: Insecta
- Order: Coleoptera
- Suborder: Polyphaga
- Infraorder: Scarabaeiformia
- Family: Scarabaeidae
- Genus: Anisonyx
- Species: A. brincki

Binomial name
- Anisonyx brincki Schein, 1959

Species of beetle

Anisonyx brincki is a species of beetle of the family Scarabaeidae. It is found in South Africa (Eastern Cape) and Lesotho.

== Description ==
Adults reach a length of about 8–10 mm (0.31–0.39 in). They are pale and deep black Anisonyx with light blue and golden-green mixed scales and long, black hairs on top, which become grey-brown at the scutellum. The hairs on the underside are reddish-white.

== Subspecies ==
- Anisonyx brincki brincki (Lesotho)
- Anisonyx brincki rudebecki Schein, 1959 (South Africa: Eastern Cape)
