= Anisonyx lepidotus =

Scientific classification
- Kingdom: Animalia
- Phylum: Arthropoda
- Clade: Pancrustacea
- Class: Insecta
- Order: Coleoptera
- Suborder: Polyphaga
- Infraorder: Scarabaeiformia
- Family: Scarabaeidae
- Genus: Anisonyx
- Species: A. lepidotus

Binomial name
- Anisonyx lepidotus Wiedemann, 1821

Species of beetle

Anisonyx lepidotus is a species of beetle of the family Scarabaeidae. It is found in South Africa (Western Cape).

== Description ==
Adults reach a length of about 8.5–9 mm (0.33–0.35 in). They are black, with the elytra sometimes fulvous. The head and pronotum are very densely covered with black or fulvous hairs. The pronotum has three median lines of green scales, and on each side an elongate, broad band or patch. The elytra, which are densely clothed at the base with long hairs, are fuscous or fulvous. There are also a few scattered green scales, which are also found on the pygidium.

== Life history ==
They have been recorded from Zantedeschia aethiopica.
