= Anisonyx badiitibialis =

Scientific classification
- Kingdom: Animalia
- Phylum: Arthropoda
- Clade: Pancrustacea
- Class: Insecta
- Order: Coleoptera
- Suborder: Polyphaga
- Infraorder: Scarabaeiformia
- Family: Scarabaeidae
- Genus: Anisonyx
- Species: A. badiitibialis

Binomial name
- Anisonyx badiitibialis Schein, 1959

Species of beetle

Anisonyx badiitibialis is a species of beetle of the family Scarabaeidae. It is found in Lesotho.

== Description ==
Adults reach a length of about 9–10 mm (0.35–0.39 in). They are black and weakly glossy. The elytra and sometimes also the pygidial parts are reddish-brown. The former has translucent pale bluish scale patches, while the pronotum has scattered greenish scales and the pygidial part has golden-green, sparsely spaced scales. There is yellowish pubescence on the underside.
