= Anisonyx smaragdinus =

Scientific classification
- Kingdom: Animalia
- Phylum: Arthropoda
- Clade: Pancrustacea
- Class: Insecta
- Order: Coleoptera
- Suborder: Polyphaga
- Infraorder: Scarabaeiformia
- Family: Scarabaeidae
- Genus: Anisonyx
- Species: A. smaragdinus

Binomial name
- Anisonyx smaragdinus Péringuey, 1902

Species of beetle

Anisonyx smaragdinus is a species of beetle of the family Scarabaeidae. It is found in South Africa (Western Cape).

== Description ==
Adults reach a length of about 9–10 mm (0.35–0.39 in). They are black, with the head and pronotum covered with long, black hairs interspersed on the pronotum with a few longer, white, bristly ones. The sides of the pronotum are clothed with densely set gem-like, shining, emerald green scales leaving only a somewhat narrow median band of the background uncovered. The elytra are covered laterally with similar not quite contiguous scales which are thickly set also on the median and posterior part of the space between the suture and the humeral costa. The propygidium, pygidium and abdomen are thickly clothed with similar scales.
