= Anisonyx albopilosus =

Scientific classification
- Kingdom: Animalia
- Phylum: Arthropoda
- Clade: Pancrustacea
- Class: Insecta
- Order: Coleoptera
- Suborder: Polyphaga
- Infraorder: Scarabaeiformia
- Family: Scarabaeidae
- Genus: Anisonyx
- Species: A. albopilosus

Binomial name
- Anisonyx albopilosus Schein, 1959

Species of beetle

Anisonyx albopilosus is a species of beetle of the family Scarabaeidae. It is found in South Africa (Western Cape).

== Description ==
Adults reach a length of about 9 mm (0.35 in). They are black with reddish-brown elytra with black margins. The pygidial area, underside and legs are also reddish-brown and without scales. They are covered with long and thin erect white hairs, but these are black on the sides of the head. The underside has short yellowish hairs.
