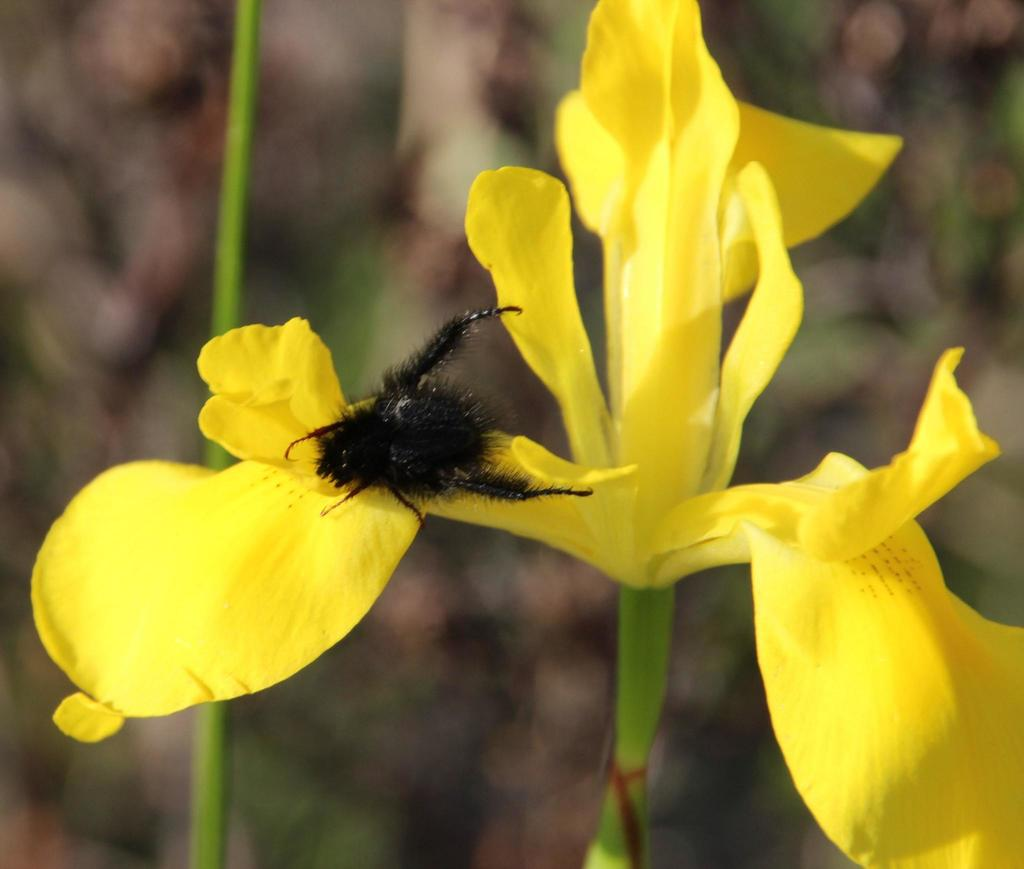

Scientific classification
- Kingdom: Animalia
- Phylum: Arthropoda
- Clade: Pancrustacea
- Class: Insecta
- Order: Coleoptera
- Suborder: Polyphaga
- Infraorder: Scarabaeiformia
- Family: Scarabaeidae
- Genus: Anisonyx
- Species: A. ursinus

Binomial name
- Anisonyx ursinus Schein, 1959

= Anisonyx ursinus =

Species of beetle

Anisonyx ursinus, the beary monkey beetle, is a species of beetle of the family Scarabaeidae. It is found in South Africa (Western Cape).

== Description ==
Adults reach a length of about 7.5–8.5 mm (0.30–0.33 in). They are black with brown elytra and legs. There are scattered, white-yellow scales, distributed in small clusters on the pronotum, elytra, propygidium and pygidium. They have black, long hairs, which become white on the scutellum.
