= Anisonyx nasuus =

Scientific classification
- Kingdom: Animalia
- Phylum: Arthropoda
- Clade: Pancrustacea
- Class: Insecta
- Order: Coleoptera
- Suborder: Polyphaga
- Infraorder: Scarabaeiformia
- Family: Scarabaeidae
- Genus: Anisonyx
- Species: A. nasuus

Binomial name
- Anisonyx nasuus Wiedemann, 1821

Species of beetle

Anisonyx nasuus is a species of beetle of the family Scarabaeidae. It is found in South Africa (Western Cape).

== Description ==
Adults reach a length of about 8–8.25 mm (0.315–0.325 in). They are similar to Anisonyx senilis in shape and colour. The elytra are very light fulvous with the outer margins more or less distinctly infuscate laterally, but there are no scales either on the pronotum, elytra, pygidium, or abdomen, and the hairs covering the head and pronotum, elytra, pygidium, and abdomen are black. The legs are also black.
