= Anisonyx andreaei =

Scientific classification
- Kingdom: Animalia
- Phylum: Arthropoda
- Clade: Pancrustacea
- Class: Insecta
- Order: Coleoptera
- Suborder: Polyphaga
- Infraorder: Scarabaeiformia
- Family: Scarabaeidae
- Genus: Anisonyx
- Species: A. andreaei

Binomial name
- Anisonyx andreaei Schein, 1959

Species of beetle

Anisonyx andreaei is a species of beetle of the family Scarabaeidae. It is found in South Africa (Western Cape).

== Description ==
Adults reach a length of about 8.5 mm (0.33 in). They are black, with brown elytra. There are very small bluish or greenish scales on the pronotum, elytra and pygidium and they have long blackish pubescence, which is yellowish on the abdomen.
