= Anisonyx pseudomilitaris =

Scientific classification
- Kingdom: Animalia
- Phylum: Arthropoda
- Clade: Pancrustacea
- Class: Insecta
- Order: Coleoptera
- Suborder: Polyphaga
- Infraorder: Scarabaeiformia
- Family: Scarabaeidae
- Genus: Anisonyx
- Species: A. pseudomilitaris

Binomial name
- Anisonyx pseudomilitaris Schein, 1959

Species of beetle

Anisonyx pseudomilitaris is a species of beetle of the family Scarabaeidae. It is found in South Africa (Western Cape).

== Description ==
Adults reach a length of about 9–10 mm (0.35–0.39 in). They are black, with orange-red scale margins on the elytra from the shoulders to behind the apical tubules, and without further colored scales. The antennae, as well as the fore and mid tarsi are brown.
