= Anisonyx =

Scientific classification
- Kingdom: Animalia
- Phylum: Arthropoda
- Class: Insecta
- Order: Coleoptera
- Suborder: Polyphaga
- Infraorder: Scarabaeiformia
- Family: Scarabaeidae
- Subfamily: Melolonthinae
- Tribe: Hopliini
- Genus: Anisonyx; Latreille, 1807

Genus of leaf beetles

Anisonyx, commonly known as the shaggy monkey beetles, is a genus of beetles belonging to the family Scarabaeidae.

== Species ==
- Anisonyx albopilosus Schein, 1959
- Anisonyx alticola Andreae, 1965
- Anisonyx andreaei Schein, 1959
- Anisonyx badiitibialis Schein, 1959
- Anisonyx bipilosus Moser, 1918
- Anisonyx brincki Schein, 1959
- Anisonyx ditus Péringuey, 1902
- Anisonyx elizabethae Péringuey, 1902
- Anisonyx gemmeus Péringuey, 1902
- Anisonyx hessei Schein, 1959
- Anisonyx hilaris Péringuey, 1902
- Anisonyx ignitus Laporte, 1840
- Anisonyx lepidotus Wiedemann, 1821
- Anisonyx longipes (Linnaeus, 1764)
- Anisonyx lynx (Fabricius, 1776)
- Anisonyx militaris Arrow, 1932
- Anisonyx montanus Andreae, 1965
- Anisonyx nasuus Wiedemann, 1821
- Anisonyx nigerrimus Schein, 1959
- Anisonyx pauperatus Péringuey, 1902
- Anisonyx phillipsi Schein, 1959
- Anisonyx proletarius Péringuey, 1902
- Anisonyx pseudomilitaris Schein, 1959
- Anisonyx senilis Burmeister, 1844
- Anisonyx sesuto Péringuey, 1908
- Anisonyx setisquama Andreae, 1965
- Anisonyx smaragdinus Péringuey, 1902
- Anisonyx ursinus Schein, 1959
- Anisonyx ursus (Fabricius, 1775)
