= Anisonyx nigerrimus =

Scientific classification
- Kingdom: Animalia
- Phylum: Arthropoda
- Clade: Pancrustacea
- Class: Insecta
- Order: Coleoptera
- Suborder: Polyphaga
- Infraorder: Scarabaeiformia
- Family: Scarabaeidae
- Genus: Anisonyx
- Species: A. nigerrimus

Binomial name
- Anisonyx nigerrimus Schein, 1959

Species of beetle

Anisonyx nigerrimus is a species of beetle of the family Scarabaeidae. It is found in South Africa (Eastern Cape).

== Description ==
Adults reach a length of about 7.5–8.5 mm (0.30–0.33 in). They are uniformly deep black and scaleless, with long black hairs.
