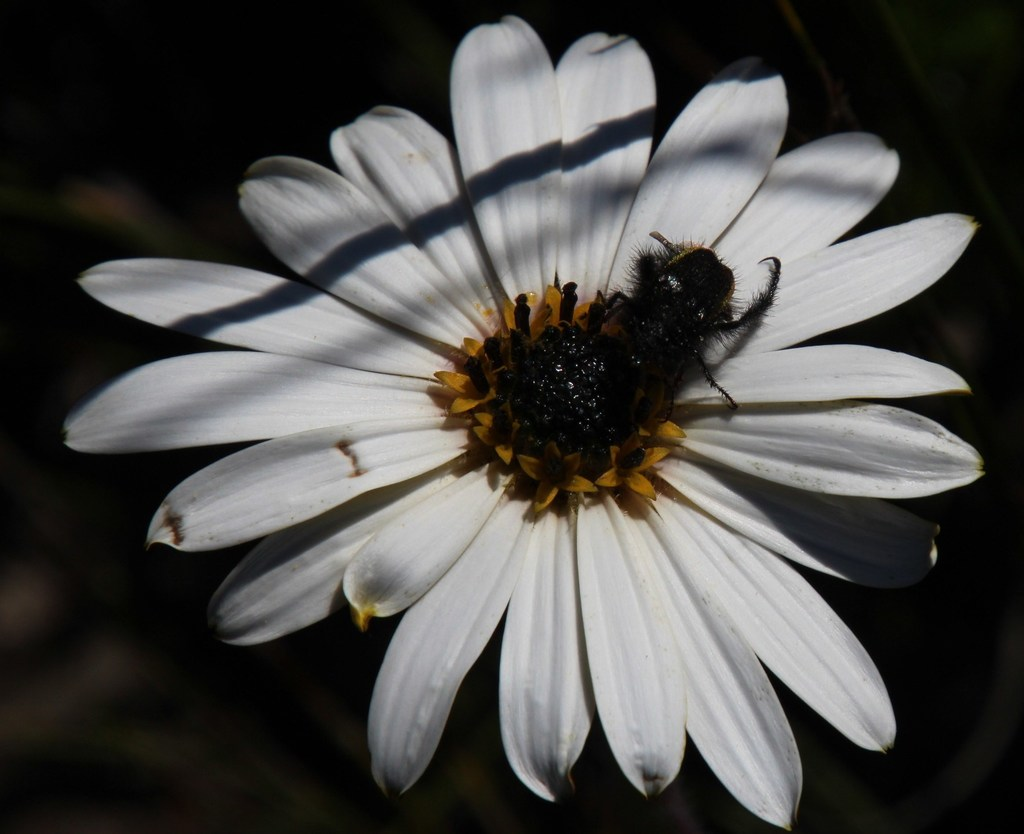

Scientific classification
- Kingdom: Animalia
- Phylum: Arthropoda
- Clade: Pancrustacea
- Class: Insecta
- Order: Coleoptera
- Suborder: Polyphaga
- Infraorder: Scarabaeiformia
- Family: Scarabaeidae
- Genus: Anisonyx
- Species: A. lynx

Binomial name
- Anisonyx lynx (Fabricius, 1776)

Synonyms
- Melolontha lynx Fabricius, 1776

= Anisonyx lynx =

Species of beetle

Anisonyx lynx is a species of beetle of the family Scarabaeidae. It is found in South Africa (Western Cape).

== Description ==
Adults reach a length of about 9–9.25 mm (0.354–0.364 in). They are black, with the elytra dark chocolate colour. The head and pronotum are clothed with very dense and very long black hairs. The clypeus is slender and not much narrowed laterally towards the tip. There are no scales on the pronotum, pygidium, or abdomen, but on the elytra there is a well-defined outer marginal band of opaline golden scales which do not extend round the apex. The pygidium, abdomen, pectus, and hind legs are clothed with black or greyish black hairs.
