= Anisonyx sesuto =

Scientific classification
- Kingdom: Animalia
- Phylum: Arthropoda
- Clade: Pancrustacea
- Class: Insecta
- Order: Coleoptera
- Suborder: Polyphaga
- Infraorder: Scarabaeiformia
- Family: Scarabaeidae
- Genus: Anisonyx
- Species: A. sesuto

Binomial name
- Anisonyx sesuto Péringuey, 1908

Species of beetle

Anisonyx sesuto is a species of beetle of the family Scarabaeidae. It is found in South Africa (KwaZulu-Natal) and Lesotho.

== Description ==
Adults reach a length of about 7–7.5 mm (0.28–0.30 in). They are black, with the elytra chestnut-brown, clothed on the head with long, erect black setae interspersed with light fulvous and not very dense ones. On the elytra, these setae are seriate. The whole underside of the pygidium and the legs have a long, dense yellowish pubescence. The clypeus is bare and closely punctate, the frontal part is covered with golden green, ovate scales. On the pronotum, these scales are disposed in three central longitudinal bands and the sides are thickly covered with them. On the elytra they form three elongate agglomerations along the suture, and they are somewhat crowded on the sides. On the pygidial parts and underneath these scales are quite contiguous, and they are very numerous on the outer part of the intermediate and posterior legs.
