= Anisonyx hessei =

Scientific classification
- Kingdom: Animalia
- Phylum: Arthropoda
- Clade: Pancrustacea
- Class: Insecta
- Order: Coleoptera
- Suborder: Polyphaga
- Infraorder: Scarabaeiformia
- Family: Scarabaeidae
- Genus: Anisonyx
- Species: A. hessei

Binomial name
- Anisonyx hessei Schein, 1959

Species of beetle

Anisonyx hessei is a species of beetle of the family Scarabaeidae. It is found in South Africa (Western Cape).

== Description ==
Adults reach a length of about 8–9 mm (0.31–0.35 in). They are black, with reddish-brown elytra and a golden-yellow scale margin. The pygidium and abdomen also have golden-yellow scales. There is erect, long, black pubescence on the head, pronotum and thorax, and greyish-white pubescence on the abdomen. The elytra have short reddish-brown hairs beneath the long pubescence.
