= Anisonyx montanus =

Scientific classification
- Kingdom: Animalia
- Phylum: Arthropoda
- Clade: Pancrustacea
- Class: Insecta
- Order: Coleoptera
- Suborder: Polyphaga
- Infraorder: Scarabaeiformia
- Family: Scarabaeidae
- Genus: Anisonyx
- Species: A. montanus

Binomial name
- Anisonyx montanus Andreae, 1965

Species of beetle

Anisonyx montanus is a species of beetle of the family Scarabaeidae. It is found in South Africa (KwaZulu-Natal).

== Description ==
Adults reach a length of about 6.6–7.4 mm (0.26–0.29 in). They are similar to Anisonyx alticola, but less shining and with lighter fulvous elytra without black margins.
