= Klaarstroom =

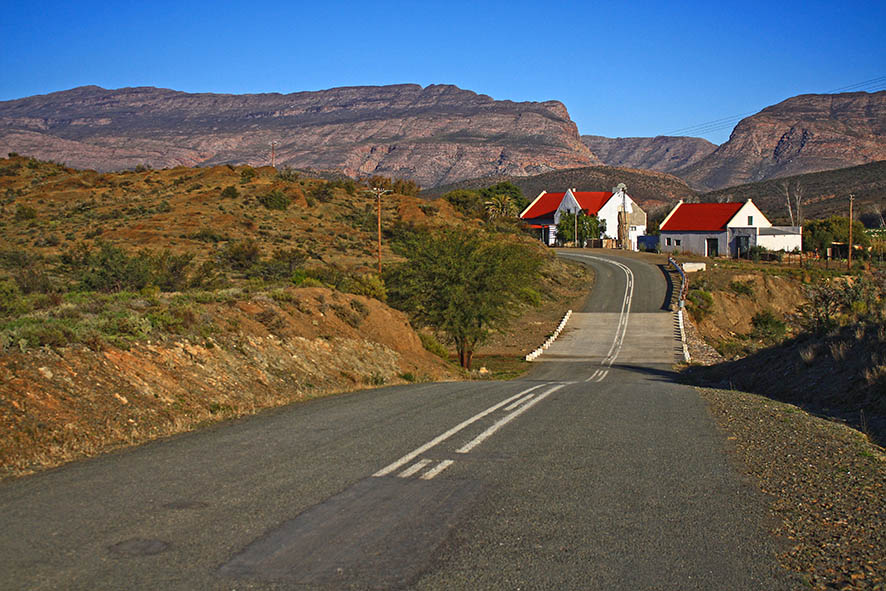
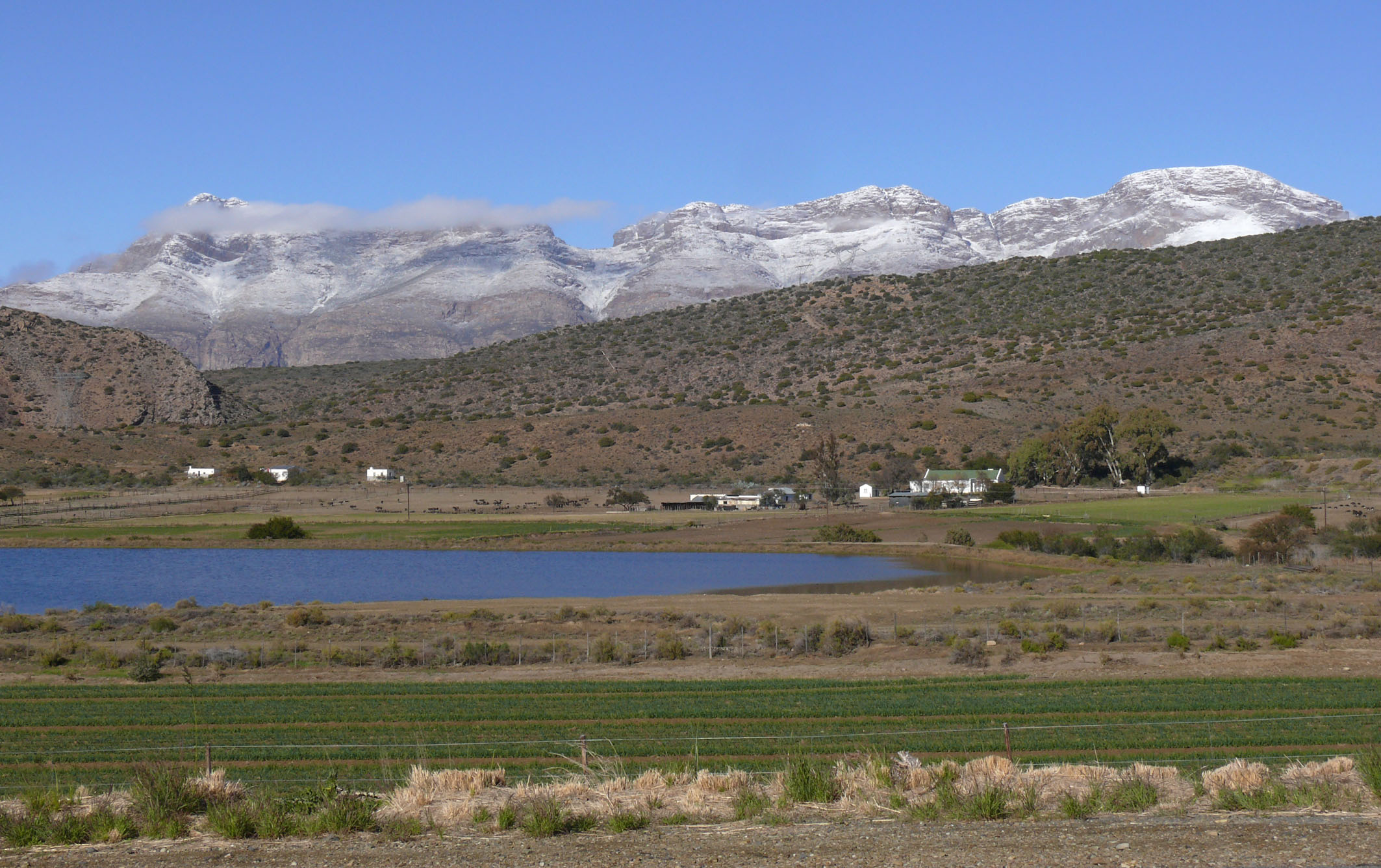
- Top, the Klaarstroom General. Bottom, a view of the mountains in winter surrounding Klaarstroom.

- Location within Western Cape Location within South Africa
- Coordinates: 33.3°S 22.333°E
- Country: South Africa
- Province: Western Cape
- District: Central Karoo
- Municipality: Prince Albert

Area
  - Total: 3.27 km^{2} (1.26 sq mi)

Population (2011)
  - Total: 584
  - Density: 179/km^{2} (463/sq mi)

Racial makeup (2011)
  - Black African: 1.0%
  - Coloured: 96.1%
  - White: 2.9%

First languages (2011)
  - Afrikaans: 98.3%
  - English: 1.7%
- Time zone: UTC+2 (SAST)
- PO box: 6932

Klaarstroom is a village in Prince Albert Local Municipality in the Western Cape province of South Africa.

It is situated at the northern end of Meiringspoort, about 60 km east of Prince Albert and 95 km north-west of Uniondale. Originally named Pietersburg, its present name, Afrikaans for 'clear stream', probably refers to waters flowing from the Swartberg into the lowlands.
