= Anisonyx phillipsi =

Scientific classification
- Kingdom: Animalia
- Phylum: Arthropoda
- Clade: Pancrustacea
- Class: Insecta
- Order: Coleoptera
- Suborder: Polyphaga
- Infraorder: Scarabaeiformia
- Family: Scarabaeidae
- Genus: Anisonyx
- Species: A. phillipsi

Binomial name
- Anisonyx phillipsi Schein, 1959

Species of beetle

Anisonyx phillipsi is a species of beetle of the family Scarabaeidae. It is found in South Africa (Western Cape).

== Description ==
Adults reach a length of about 7–8 mm (0.28–0.31 in). They are black, sometimes with a brown abdomen. There are very small oval, very scattered, light blue scales on the pronotum, elytra, pygidium and abdomen. The pubescence is blackish above and light greyish-brown below.
