= Anisonyx longipes =

Scientific classification
- Kingdom: Animalia
- Phylum: Arthropoda
- Clade: Pancrustacea
- Class: Insecta
- Order: Coleoptera
- Suborder: Polyphaga
- Infraorder: Scarabaeiformia
- Family: Scarabaeidae
- Genus: Anisonyx
- Species: A. longipes

Binomial name
- Anisonyx longipes (Linnaeus, 1764)

Synonyms
- Scarabaeus longipes Linnaeus, 1764; Anisonyx longipes aureovariegatus Schein, 1959; Anisonyx jucundus Blanchard, 1850; Melolontha crinita Fabricius, 1776

Species of beetle

Anisonyx longipes is a species of beetle of the family Scarabaeidae. It is found in South Africa (Western Cape).

== Description ==
Adults reach a length of about 9.5–10 mm (0.37–0.39 in). They are black, with the head and pronotum clothed with very dense, black hairs. There are fine, narrow, longitudinal bands of small, elongate, emerald green scales on the pronotum. The elytra, propygidium, and pygidium are clothed with closely set but not contiguous, small, elongated emerald green scales. The abdomen is without scales. The antennae and legs are black. The scales, though generally green, are occasionally blue.
