= Anisonyx alticola =

Scientific classification
- Kingdom: Animalia
- Phylum: Arthropoda
- Clade: Pancrustacea
- Class: Insecta
- Order: Coleoptera
- Suborder: Polyphaga
- Infraorder: Scarabaeiformia
- Family: Scarabaeidae
- Genus: Anisonyx
- Species: A. alticola

Binomial name
- Anisonyx alticola Andreae, 1965

Species of beetle

Anisonyx alticola is a species of beetle of the family Scarabaeidae. It is found in South Africa (KwaZulu-Natal).

== Description ==
Adults reach a length of about 6.7–6.9 mm (0.26–0.27 in) (males) and 8.1–8.2 mm (0.32–0.32 in) (females). They are black and shining, with fulvous elytra (in males with black margins). There are some deep blue scales on the upperside. The scales on the propygidium, pygidium, abdomen and hind legs are closer together and not as deep blue. There are long black setae and short light greyish hairs on the upperside.
