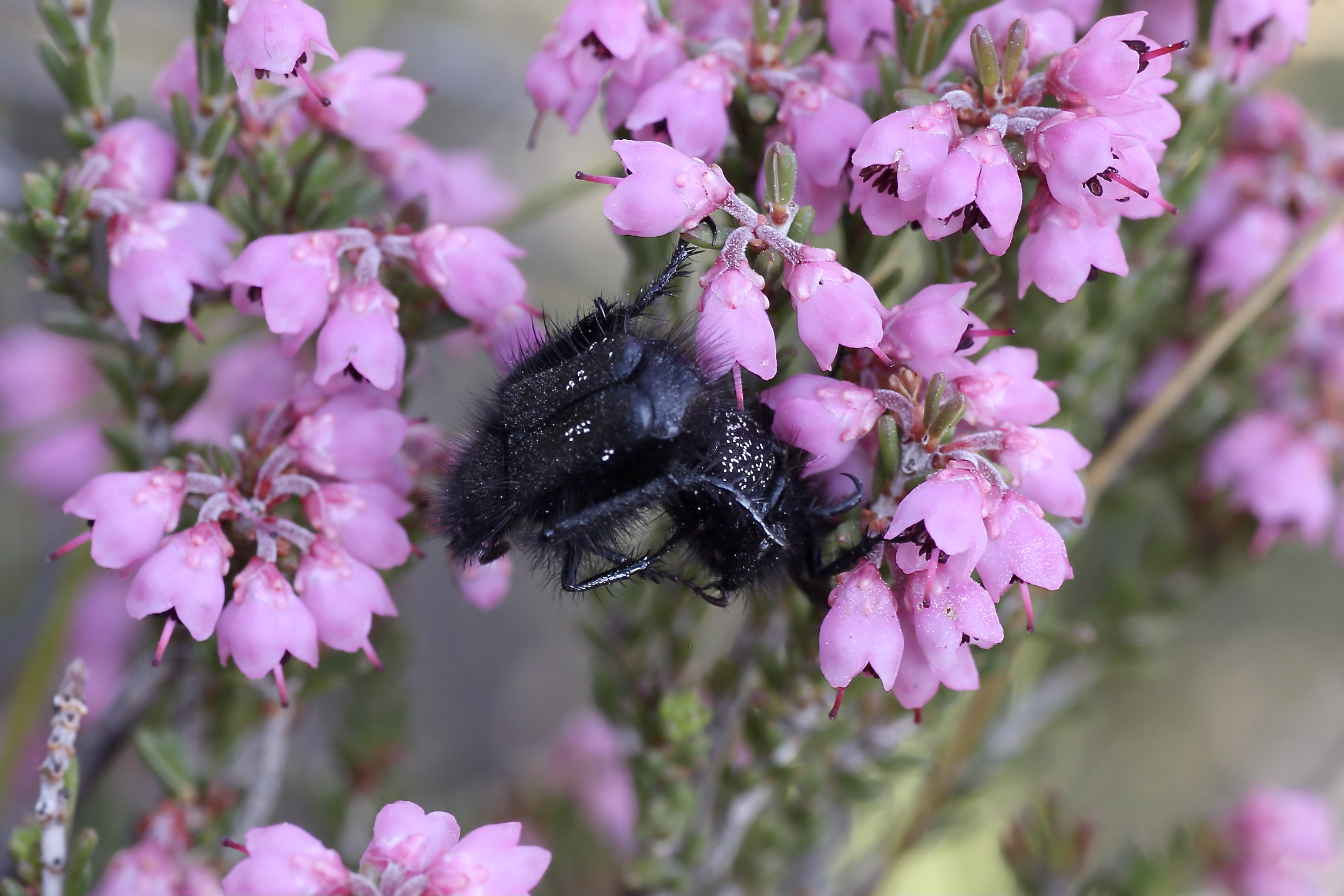

Scientific classification
- Kingdom: Animalia
- Phylum: Arthropoda
- Clade: Pancrustacea
- Class: Insecta
- Order: Coleoptera
- Suborder: Polyphaga
- Infraorder: Scarabaeiformia
- Family: Scarabaeidae
- Genus: Anisonyx
- Species: A. ursus

Binomial name
- Anisonyx ursus (Fabricius, 1775)

Synonyms
- Melolontha ursus Fabricius, 1775

= Anisonyx ursus =

Species of beetle

Anisonyx ursus, the bear monkey beetle, is a species of beetle of the family Scarabaeidae. It is found in South Africa (Western Cape).

== Description ==
Adults reach a length of about 9.5–11 mm (0.37–0.43 in). They are black, with the antennae and anterior and intermediate legs testaceous red. The clypeus is clothed with very long and very dense black hairs. The pronotum is as densely clothed with black hairs as the head and the elytra are clothed with long, greyish and black hairs, which are bristly along the suture.

== Life history ==
This species is found at the beginning of spring. They may be found on heaths or any flower in bloom at the time. The larvae make no cocoons.
