= Anisonyx hilaris =

Scientific classification
- Kingdom: Animalia
- Phylum: Arthropoda
- Clade: Pancrustacea
- Class: Insecta
- Order: Coleoptera
- Suborder: Polyphaga
- Infraorder: Scarabaeiformia
- Family: Scarabaeidae
- Genus: Anisonyx
- Species: A. hilaris

Binomial name
- Anisonyx hilaris Péringuey, 1902

Species of beetle

Anisonyx hilaris is a species of beetle of the family Scarabaeidae. It is found in South Africa (Western Cape).

== Description ==
Adults reach a length of about 9–10 mm (0.35–0.39 in). They have a black head and pronotum, while the elytra and legs are light brick-red. The antennae are black. The head and pronotum are densely covered with black hairs, and the pronotum has two broad bands of bluish scales on each side, and a narrow, median one. The two lateral bands often coalesce. The scutellum has no scales, but on the elytra there are some scattered sapphire scales. The propygidium and pygidium are clothed with more or less closely set sapphire ovate scales and greyish hairs.
