= Anisonyx senilis =

Scientific classification
- Kingdom: Animalia
- Phylum: Arthropoda
- Clade: Pancrustacea
- Class: Insecta
- Order: Coleoptera
- Suborder: Polyphaga
- Infraorder: Scarabaeiformia
- Family: Scarabaeidae
- Genus: Anisonyx
- Species: A. senilis

Binomial name
- Anisonyx senilis Burmeister, 1844

Species of beetle

Anisonyx senilis is a species of beetle of the family Scarabaeidae. It is found in South Africa (Cape).

== Description ==
Adults reach a length of about 9.5 mm (0.37 in). They are black, with the elytra light fulvous, and distinctly edged laterally with black. The sides of the head are clothed with black hairs, but the hairs on the rest of the head and the pronotum are whitish. There are no scales on the head, pronotum or scutellum, but the elytra, which are somewhat densely clothed with greyish hairs, and have a sutural series of not closely set black setae, have a border of not very closely set sub-opaline golden scales along the margin, and also a strip of them along the suture which is very narrowly infuscate. The propygidium and pygidium are densely scaly.
