= Anisonyx pauperatus =

Scientific classification
- Kingdom: Animalia
- Phylum: Arthropoda
- Clade: Pancrustacea
- Class: Insecta
- Order: Coleoptera
- Suborder: Polyphaga
- Infraorder: Scarabaeiformia
- Family: Scarabaeidae
- Genus: Anisonyx
- Species: A. pauperatus

Binomial name
- Anisonyx pauperatus Péringuey, 1902

Species of beetle

Anisonyx pauperatus is a species of beetle of the family Scarabaeidae. It is found in South Africa (Eastern Cape, Northern Cape).

== Description ==
Adults reach a length of about 8–9.5 mm (0.31–0.37 in). They are black, with the head and pronotum clothed with dense, long, black hairs. The pronotum is sprinkled with a few greenish-blue scales and the elytra are clothed with long, greyish black hairs intermingled with a few white, bristly ones, and have here and there scattered bluish scales which, however, are denser along the outer margin. The propygidium, pygidium and abdomen are clothed with similar scales which and the pygidium is also clothed with black and white long hairs.
