= Meiringspoort =

Mountain pass in South Africa

Meiringspoort Meiring's pass
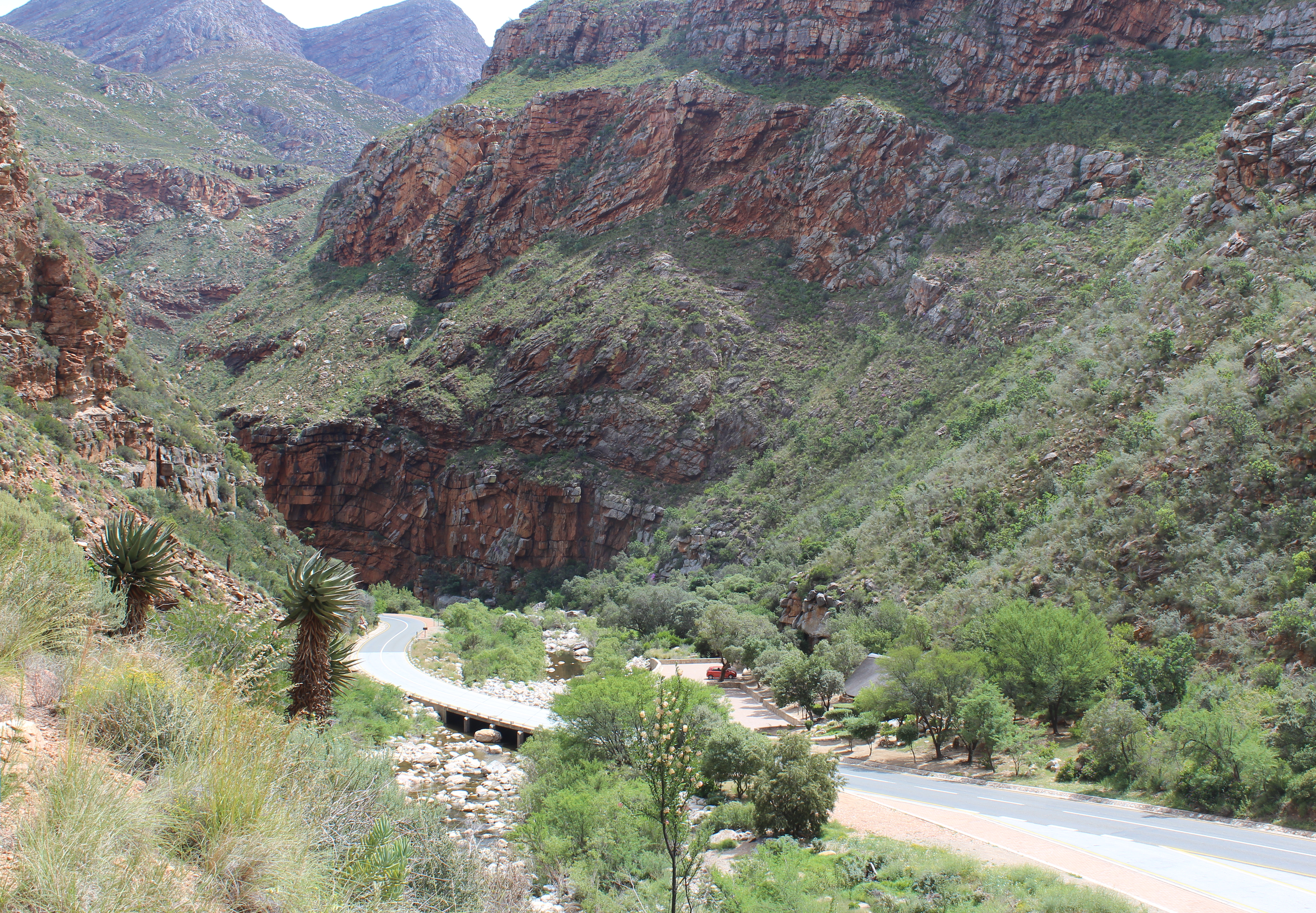
- View of the road, on the Meiringspoort pass

- Location within South Africa

Third Approach
- Location: N12 national road, where it crosses the Swartberg mountain range
- Coordinates: 33.4163°S 22.5497°E

Meiringspoort (Afrikaans for "Meiring's defile") is a South African mountain pass on the N12 national road, where it crosses the Swartberg mountain range.

== Geography ==
The pass is a gateway that connects the Little Karoo and the Great Karoo, through a gorge with a 25 km road crossing the same river 25 times in the span of the 25 km.

It runs between the modern town of Klaarstroom in the north, and the town of De Rust in the south. The mountains it crosses are those of the Swartberg range (Afrikaans for black mountain).

The Swartberg is amongst the best exposed fold mountain chains in the world, and the pass slices through magnificently scenic geological formations. The Swartberg chain runs roughly east–west along the northern edge of the semi-arid area called the Little Karoo in the Western Cape province of South Africa. To the north of the range lies the large semi-arid hinterland of South Africa, the Great Karoo. Much of the Swartberg is part of a UNESCO World Heritage Site.

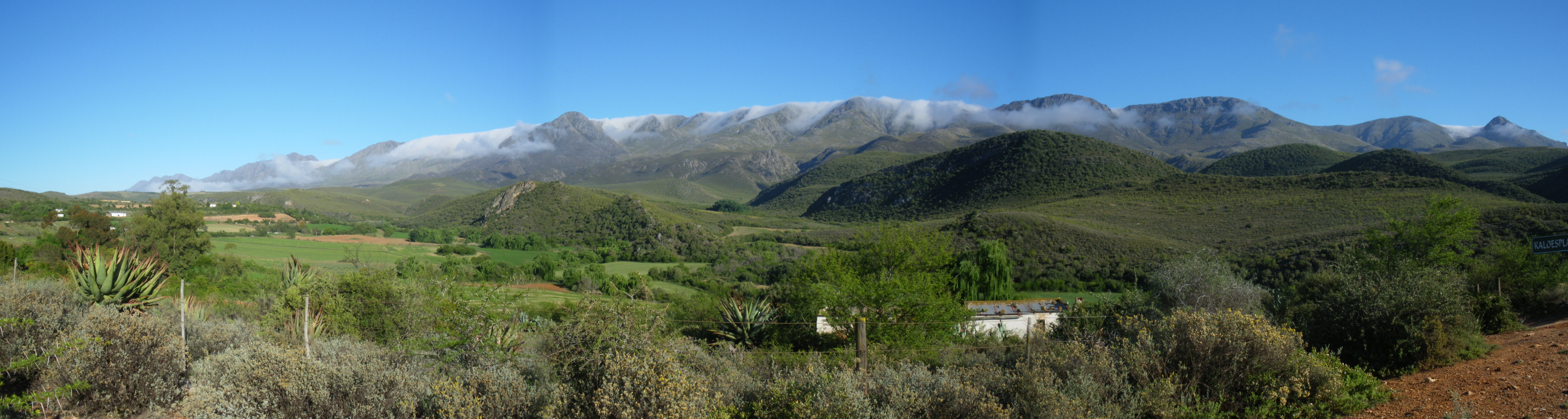
The over 2000 m high Greater Swartberg range in the distance, viewed from farmlands near the town of Oudtshoorn in the relatively well-watered south.

== History ==
=== Early crossings ===
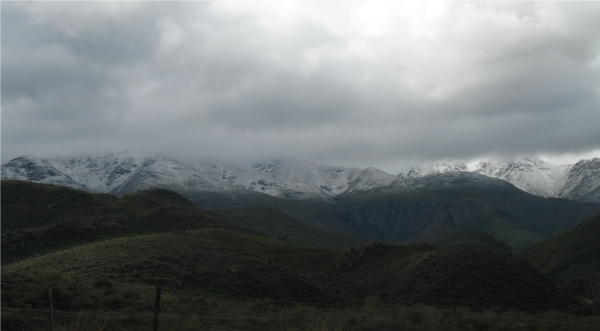
The Great Swartberg mountain range, seen from the south in stormy weather.

The vast Great Swartberg mountain range formed an almost impenetrable barrier for much of the subcontinent's history - separating the Little Karoo in the south, from the Great Karoo of the arid southern African hinterland. The indigenous Khoi-San people had long inhabited the valleys on both sides of the range, and undoubtedly made successful crossings of these mountains. However these journeys were unfortunately not recorded.

In 1800, a farmer from De Rust in the south made the first successful recorded crossing of this point of the range. His name, Petrus Johannes Meiring, was later commemorated in the name of the pass. Eventually, using the river's low point, he and Gerome Marincowitz, another farmer from the north of the range, even opened up a tiny bridle path, along the "Groote Stroom", which enabled the most intrepid travellers to journey through the mountains. In the coming years, Meiring was extremely active in building the campaign for a pass across the Swartberg.

=== The route ===
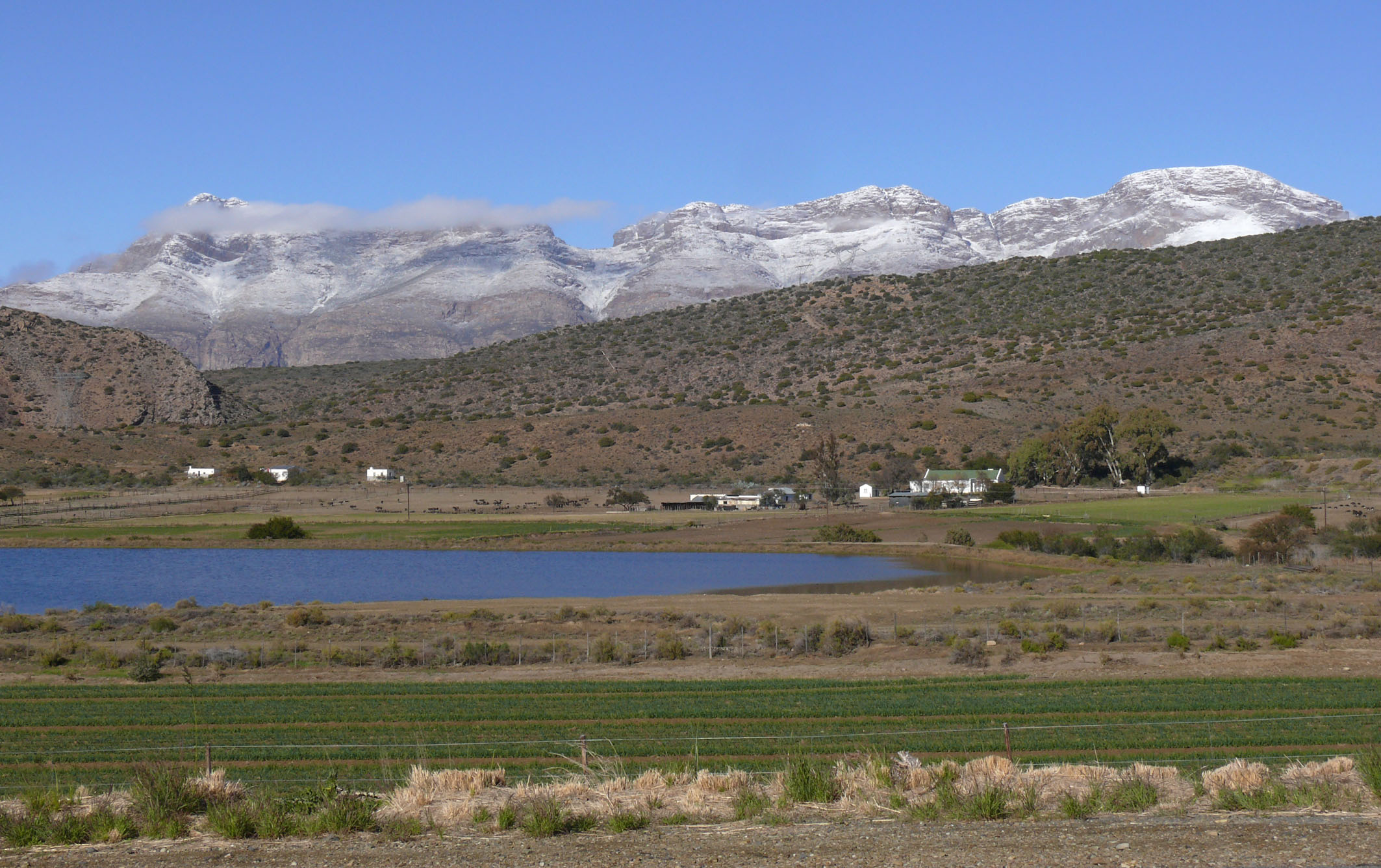
View of the Swartberg Mountain barrier from Klaarstroom in the arid north

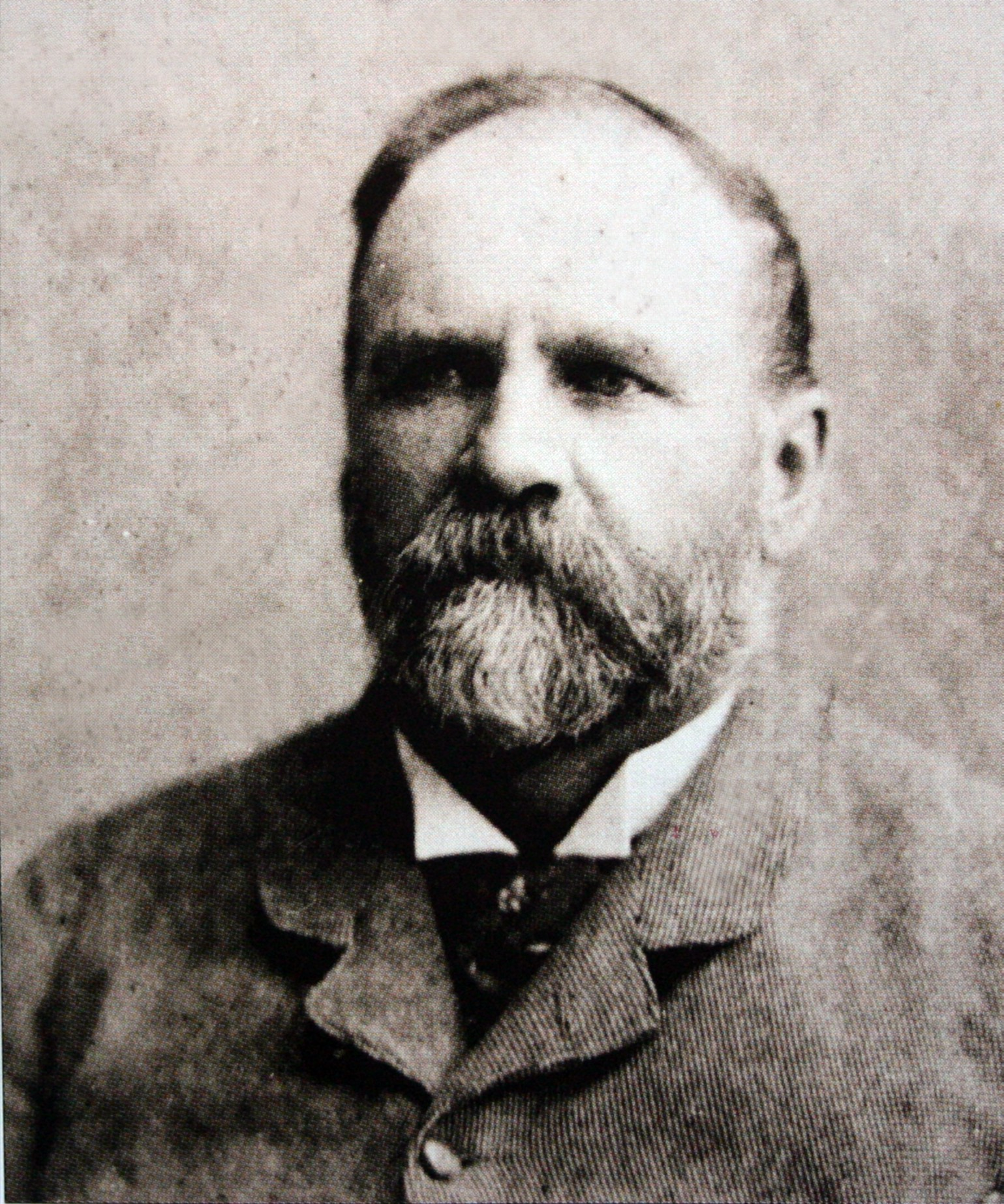
The great road engineer Thomas Charles John Bain

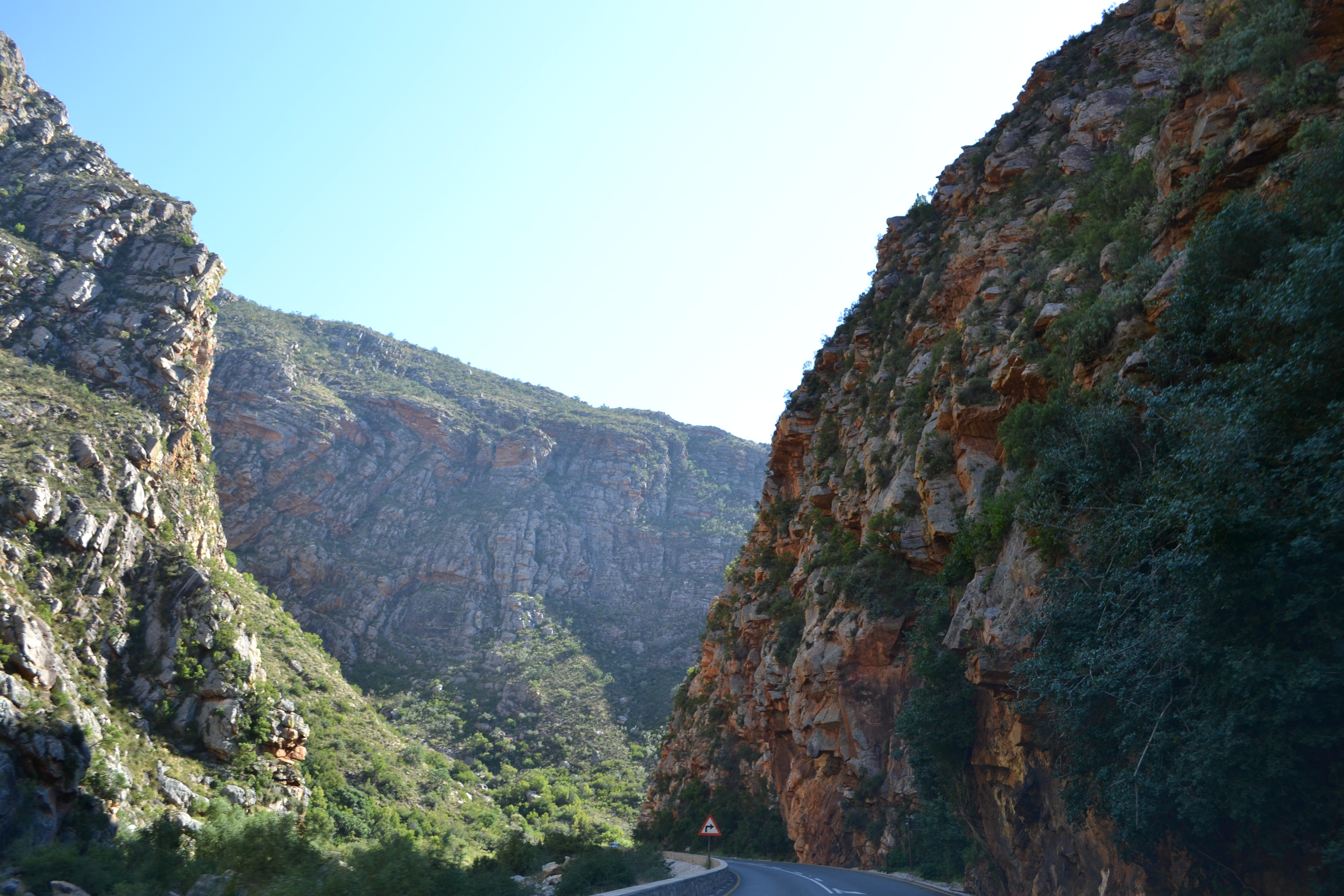
View of a portion of the pass

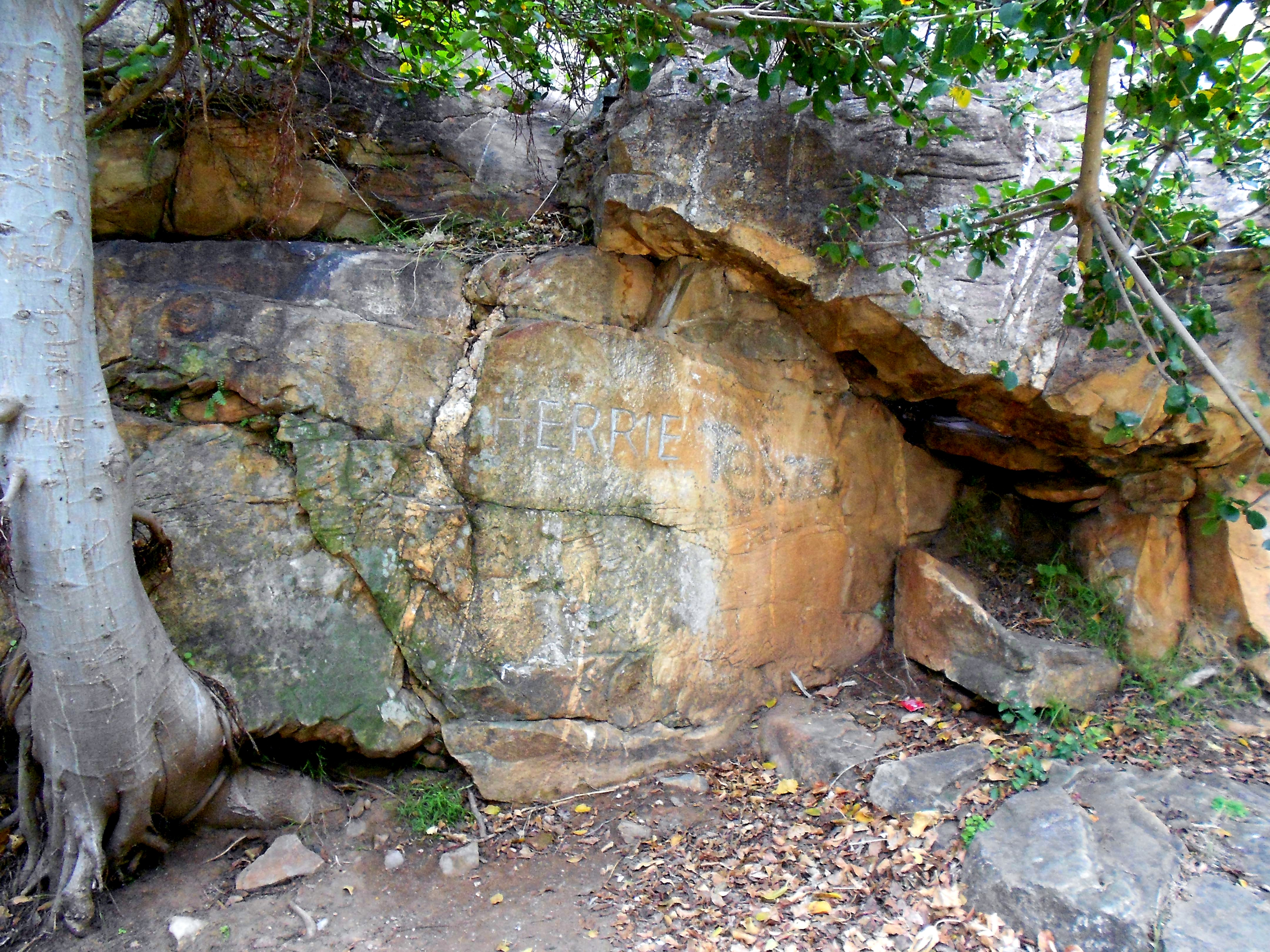
The Herrieklip, Meiringspoort

The pass itself had its origins in a series of petitions from the local people on both sides of the mountains, and in the Molteno report, which ordered the pass's construction in response. John Molteno was an Italian immigrant farmer, who had just been elected to represent much of the Great Karoo region in the new Cape Parliament. In August 1854 he set off on horseback from the village of Beaufort West, together with the two great road engineers Thomas and Andrew Geddes Bain and a friend, Charles Pritchard. After several days journey the four riders reached the Swartberg, and they then spent considerable time exploring the valleys and mountains of the range. Among other routes, they made a crossing along the route that the current road follows.

The Bains favoured a more eastern pass through the Swartberg, along the slopes they had explored in the Toorwater Poort. It was an easier, more efficient crossing to construct for engineering purposes, however it was 50 km east, which would have meant an extra 4 or 5 days travel for every journey across the mountains. Molteno's report therefore chose the route of the current pass. It created a select committee in 1856, which allocated funds, led to the surveying of the chosen route, and the employment of a team of paid labourers (not convict labour as was common at the time). The report envisioned the pass as a means of connecting the underdeveloped Karoo hinterland with the port at Mossel Bay, thereby stimulating exports from the hinterland and the overall Karoo economy.

=== Construction ===
The initial allocated budget of £5,000 was at the time considered vastly insufficient, but in the end the project costed only slightly more, at £5,018. The likely possibility of frequent flood damage to the completed road in the ensuing years also needed to be considered.

Construction commenced in August 1856, supervised by Adam de Schmidt, and under the overall management of the Bains. It was on this project that Andrew Geddes Bain developed his revolutionary technique for breaking up and cutting through large boulders. The first stage of building required the clearing of vegetation. He discovered that piling the recently cleared vegetation onto the rock and burning it caused the necessary heat to split the rock up. This was helped further by pouring cold water on the heated rock afterwards. The technique meant that blasting became rarely necessary.

The pass was also the first major project of the young Thomas Bain. Once commenced, the entire 16 km pass was completed in only 223 days of work, opening on 3 March 1858.

A procession of 50 carts, 12 wagons and 300 horsemen crossed it for the opening, and Andrew Bain suggested the name of "Meiring" for the pass, in honour of the farmer, Petrus Meiring.

=== Effects ===
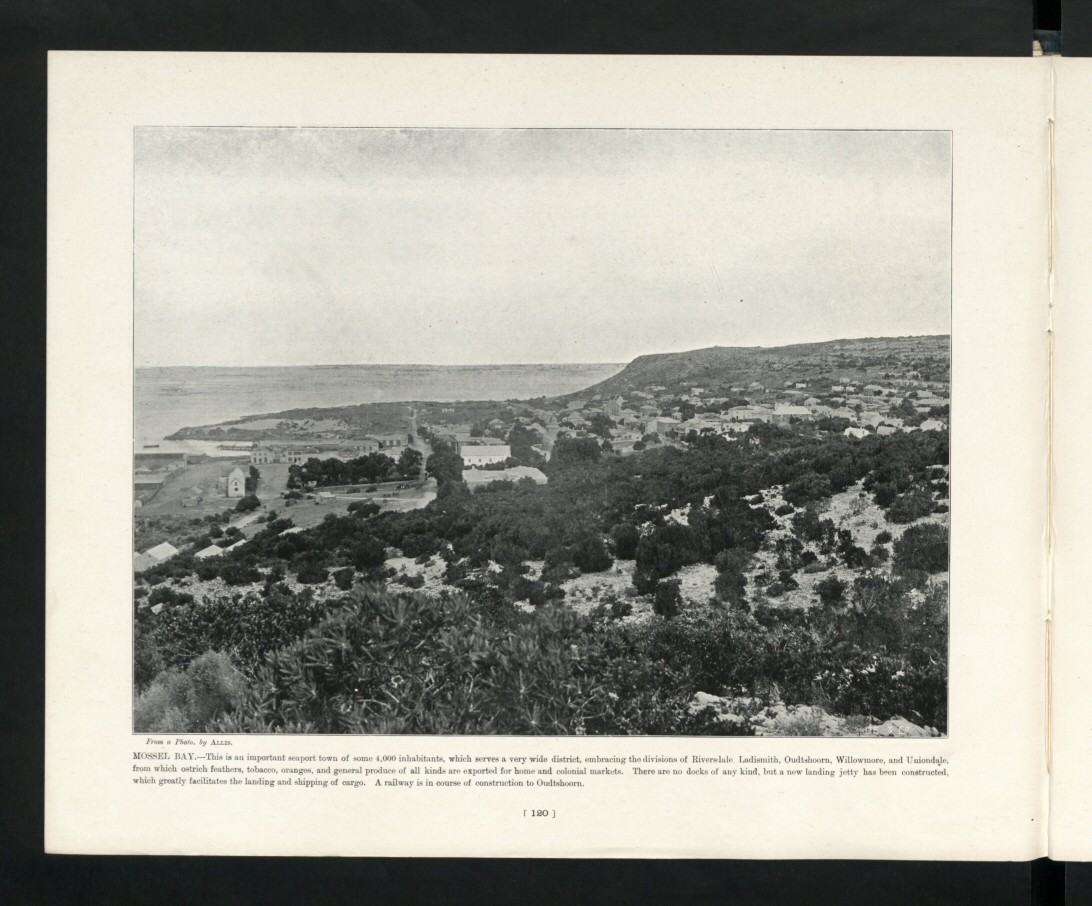
Mossel Bay, the intended port and harbour for the Karoo hinterland

The initial report had conceived of the pass as a way of connecting farmers and businesses in the southern African hinterland, with the port at Mossel Bay.

A measure of its success was that Mossel Bay's port structures had to be expanded almost immediately, to cope with the massive growth in exports. By the 1870s, in spite of the frequent repairs from flood damage, one eighth of the country's entire export wool produce was being transported through the pass.

=== Herrieklip ===
The "Herrieklip" (Herrie Stone) in Meiringspoort is a stone approximately 15 km from the southern entrance to the gorge where the poet C.J. Langenhoven carved the name "Herrie" into the sandstone in 1929. Herrie was a fictional circus elephant in Langenhoven's satirical works "Sonde met die bure" (Trouble with the neighbours, 1921) and "Herrie op die ou tremspoor" (Herrie on the old tram track, 1925). The stone was declared a national monument in 1973.
