= List of compositions by Erik Satie =

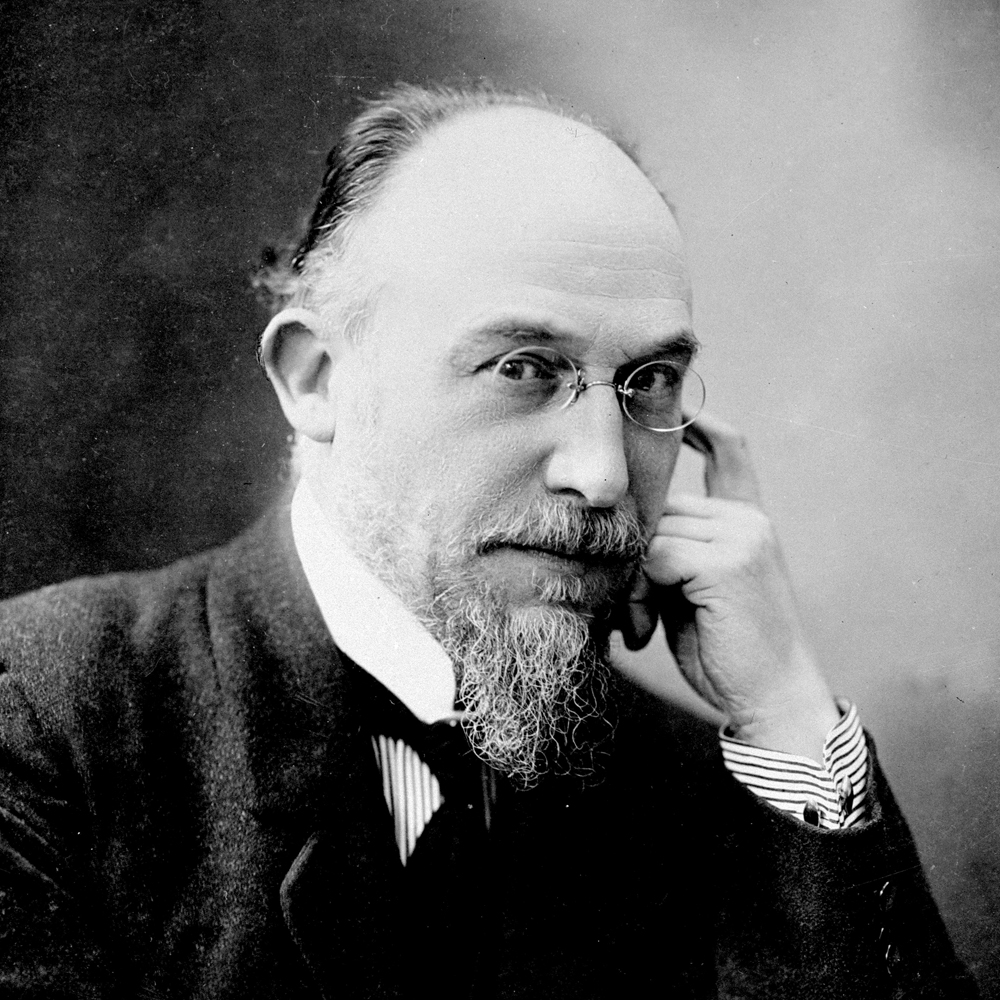
Erik Satie

In this list of Erik Satie's musical compositions, those series or sets comprising several pieces (e.g., Gnossienne 1, Gnossienne 2, etc.) with nothing but tempo indications to distinguish the movements by name, are generally given with the number of individual pieces simply stated in square brackets. If the pieces in a series have distinct titles, for example the 21 pieces in Sports et divertissements, all titles are given.

Many of Satie's works were not published until many years after they were composed, including a considerable number first published posthumously. This article gives the known or approximate date of composition for each work.

== Piano music ==
=== Series ===
- Ogives [4] (1886)
- Sarabandes [3] (1887)
- Gymnopédies [3] (1888)
- Gnossiennes [3] (1890–93)
- Danses gothiques [9] (1893)
- Pièces froides [6] (1897, two sets: Airs à faire fuir [3] and Danse de travers [3])
- Trois morceaux en forme de poire (1903, 4 hands)
  1. Manière de commencement
  2. Prolongement du même
  3. I
  4. II
  5. III
  6. En plus
  7. Redite
- Nouvelles pièces froides (1907)
  1. Sur un mur
  2. Sur un arbre
  3. Sur un pont
- Aperçus désagréables (1908, 1912, 4 hands)
  1. Pastorale
  2. Choral
  3. Fugue
- Deux choses (c. 1909)
  1. Effronterie
  2. Poésie
- 2 Rêveries nocturnes (c. 1912, published posthumously)
  1. Pas Vite
  2. Très Modérément
- 2 Préludes pour un chien (1912)
  1. Untitled (unpublished)
  2. Prélude canin (published posthumously)
- Préludes flasques (pour un chien) (1912)
  1. Voix d'intérieur
  2. Idylle cynique
  3. Chanson canine
  4. Avec camaraderie (originally Sous la futaille)
- Véritables Préludes flasques (pour un chien) (1912)
  1. Sévère réprimande
  2. Seul à la maison
  3. On joue
- Descriptions automatiques (1913)
  1. Sur un vaisseau
  2. Sur une lanterne
  3. Sur un casque
- Croquis et agaceries d'un gros bonhomme en bois (1913)
  1. Tyrolienne turque
  2. Danse maigre (à la manière de ces messieurs)
  3. Españaña
- Embryons desséchés (1913)
  1. d'holothurie
  2. d'edriophthalma
  3. de podophthalma
- Chapitres tournés en tous sens (1913)
  1. Celle qui parle trop
  2. Le porteur de grosses pierres
  3. Regrets des enfermés (Jonas et Latude)
- Vieux sequins et vieilles cuirasses (1913)
  1. Chez le marchand d'or (Venise XIIIe siècle)
  2. Danse cuirassée (Période grecque)
  3. La défaite des Cimbres (Cauchemar)
- Enfantines (Children's pieces):
  - L'enfance de Ko-Quo (1913, first published in 1999)
    1. Ne bois pas ton chocolat avec tes doigts
    2. Ne souffle pas dans tes oreilles
    3. Ne mets pas ta tête sous ton bras
  - 3 pieces (1913, published as Trois nouvelles enfantines in 1972)
    1. Le vilain petit vaurien
    2. Berceuse
    3. La gentille toute petite fille
  - Menus propos enfantins (1913)
    1. Le chant guerrier du roi des haricots
    2. Ce que dit la petite princesse des tulipes
    3. Valse du chocolat aux amandes
  - Enfantillages pittoresques (1913)
    1. Petit prélude à la journée
    2. Berceuse
    3. Marche du grand escalier
  - Peccadilles importunes (1913)
    1. Être jaloux de son camarade qui a une grosse tête
    2. Lui manger sa tartine
    3. Profiter de ce qu'il a des cors aux pieds pour lui prendre son cerceau
- Sports et divertissements (1914)
  1. Choral inappetissant
  2. La Balançoire
  3. La Chasse
  4. La Comédie Italienne
  5. Le Réveil de la Mariée
  6. Colin-Maillard
  7. La Pêche
  8. Le Yachting
  9. Le Bain de Mer
  10. Le Carnaval
  11. Le Golf
  12. La Pieuvre
  13. Les Courses
  14. Les Quatre-Coins
  15. Le Pique-nique
  16. Le Water-chute
  17. Le Tango
  18. Le Traîneau
  19. Le Flirt
  20. Le Feu d'artifice
  21. Le Tennis
- Heures séculaires et instantanées (1914)
  1. Obstacles venimeux
  2. Crépuscule matinal (de midi)
  3. Affolements granitiques
- Les trois valses distinguées du précieux dégoûté (1914)
  1. Sa taille
  2. Son binocle
  3. Ses jambes
- Avant-dernières pensées (1915)
  1. Idylle
  2. Aubade
  3. Méditation
- Nocturnes [5 and one unfinished] (1919)

=== Individual pieces ===
- Allegro (1884)
- Valse-ballet (1887)
- Fantaisie-valse (1887)
- Chanson hongroise (1889)
- Untitled (published posthumously as Première pensée Rose+Croix) (1891)
- Leit-motiv du "Panthée" (1891; no instrument specified)
- Fête donnée par des Chevaliers Normands en l'honneur d'une jeune demoiselle (XIe siecle) (c. 1892)
- Prélude d'Eginhard (c. 1893)
- Vexations (1893)
- Prière (1893)
- Modéré (1893, possibly part of Messe des pauvres)
- Petite ouverture à danser (1897)
- Caresse (1897)
- Aline-Polka (1899)
- Verset laïque et somptueux (1900)
- Le poisson rêveur (The Dreamy Fish, music for a tale by Lord Cheminot, alias Latour) (1901)
- Fugue-valse (1906)
- Passacaille (1906)
- Prélude en tapisserie (1906)
- Nun ruhen alle Wälder (Lutheran chorale harmonised by E.Satie) (1906)
- Fâcheux exemple (1908; counterpoint exercise)
- Désespoir agréable, Piano recording
  Désespoir agréable (1908; counterpoint exercise)
- Petite sonate (1908–9, first movement only)
- Profondeur (c.1909; minuet exercise)
- Songe-creux (c.1909; minuet exercise)
- Le prisonnier maussade (c.1909; minuet exercise)
- Le grand singe (c.1909; minuet exercise)
- San Bernardo (1913; first version of Españaña from Croquis et agaceries d'un gros bonhomme en bois, published in 2002)
- Sonatine bureaucratique (1917)
- Rag-time Parade (1917, arrangement by Hans Ourdine)
- Rêverie de l'enfance de Pantagruel (1919; arrangement of the first of Trois petites pièces montées)
- Premier Menuet (1920)

=== Posthumous collections ===
Some of Satie's early and/or unpublished works, as well as drafts and exercises, were published in the second half of the 20th century. These included (but were not limited to) the following collections:

- Gnossiennes 4-6 (1889-1897)
- Douze Petits Chorals pour Piano (1906 to 1909, Révision par Robert Caby, Edition Salabert, 1968)
- Musiques intimes et secrètes, three pieces from 1906 to 1913:
  1. Nostalgie
  2. Froide songerie
  3. Fâcheux exemple
- Six Pièces de la période, six pieces from 1906 to 1913:
  1. Désespoir agréable
  2. Both of Deux choses
  3. Prélude canin from 2 préludes pour un chien
  4. Minuet exercises: Profondeur and Songe-creux
- Carnet d'Esquisses et de Croquis, some 20 sketches and fragments from 1897 to 1914
  1. "Coucher de soleil du sommeil"
  2. "Eaux troublées"
  3. "Deuil"
  4. "Lignes dans le sable"
  5. "Ondulation"
  6. "Champ"
  7. "Transparence"
  8. "Le Mur de Verre”
  9. "Traces de lignes"
  10. "Fin soudaine"
  11. "Prochaines étapes"

== Orchestral ==
- Danse, for small orchestra (1890; arranged as movement 6 of 3 Morceaux en forme de poire)
- Le Bœuf Angora (1901, unfinished; arranged for piano by Johny Fritz)
- Musique d'ameublement (1918)
  1. Tapisserie en fer forgé, for flute, clarinet, trumpet and strings
  2. Carrelage phonique, for flute, clarinet and strings
- Trois petites pièces montées (1920)
- Musique d'ameublement: tenture de cabinet préfectoral, for small orchestra (1923)

== Other instrumental music ==
- Choses vues à droite et à gauche (sans lunettes), for violin and piano (1914)
  1. Choral hypocrite
  2. Fugue à tâtons
  3. Fantaisie musculaire
- Autre choral, for violin and piano (1914; unused fourth piece for Choses vues à droite et à gauche (sans lunettes))
- Embarquement pour Cythère, for violin and piano (1917; unfinished. Completed by R. Orledge)
- Marche de Cocagne, for two trumpets (1919; reused in the second of Trois petites pièces montées)
- Musique d'ameublement, 2 entr'actes or Sons industriels, for 3 clarinets, trombone and piano 4 hands (1920)
  1. Chez un "bistrot"
  2. Un salon
- Sonnerie pour réveiller le bon gros Roi des Singes, for two trumpets (1921)

== Dramatic works ==
- Salut drapeau!, hymn for Le Prince de Byzance ("drame romanesque"), for voice(s) and/or piano/organ (1891)
- 3 act-preludes for Le Fils des étoiles ("pastorale kaldéenne"), for flutes and harps (1891; later arranged for piano)
- 2 preludes for Le Nazaréen ("drame ésotérique"), for piano (1892)
- Uspud ("ballet chrétien"), scored for piano, with indications for flutes, harps and strings (1892)
- Prélude de la porte héroïque du ciel ("drame ésotérique"), for piano (1894)
- Jack in the Box, three pieces for a pantomime, for piano (1899)
- Geneviève de Brabant, theatre piece for soloists, chorus and piano (c. 1900)
- Petit prélude de 'La Mort de Monsieur Mouche' (play), for piano (1900)
- Pousse l'amour (operetta) (1905–6; lost)
- Monkey dances [7] for Le Piège de Méduse ("lyric comedy"), for piano (1913)
- Les Pantins dansent ("poème dansé"), for piano or small orchestra (1913)
- Cinq grimaces pour Le songe d'une nuit d'été, incidental music for a production of Shakespeare's A Midsummer Night's Dream, for orchestra (1915)
- Parade ("ballet réaliste"), for orchestra (1916–17; additional movements 1919)
- La belle excentrique ("fantaisie sérieuse"), for orchestra or piano 4 hands (1921); some movements later arranged for solo piano; one movement based on Légende californienne)
- La statue retrouvée (divertissement), for organ and trumpet (1923)
- Scènes nouvelles [9] for Gounod's Le médecin malgré lui, for soloists and orchestra (1923)
- Mercure, ballet, for orchestra (1924)
- Relâche ("ballet instantanéiste"), for orchestra (1924)

== Vocal music ==
=== Large-scale works ===
- Messe des pauvres, for SB chorus and organ (1893–95)
- Socrate ("drame symphonique"), for soloists and chamber orchestra or piano (1917–18)

=== Songs ===
- Trois mélodies (1886)
  1. Les anges
  2. Élégie
  3. Sylvie
- Bonjour Biqui, Bonjour! (1893)
- Trois autre mélodies (1906)
  1. Chanson (1887)
  2. Chanson médiévale (1906)
  3. Les fleurs (1886)
- Trois poèmes d'amour (1914)
- Trois Mélodies (Satie) (1916)
  1. La statue de bronze
  2. Daphénéo
  3. Le chapelier
- Quatre petites mélodies (Satie) (1920)
  1. Elégie
  2. Danseuse
  3. Chanson
  4. Adieu
- Ludions (1923)
  1. Air du rat
  2. Spleen
  3. La grenouille américaine
  4. Air du poète
  5. Chanson du chat

=== Cabaret songs ===
- Un dîner à l'Elysée (1899)
- Le veuf (1899–1900; two versions)
- Petit recueil des fêtes (1903–04)
  1. Le picador est mort
  2. Sorcière
  3. Enfant-martyre
  4. Air fantôme
- J'avais un ami (1904)
- Les bons mouvements (1904)
- Douceur d'oublier (1904)
- Impérial-Oxford (c. 1905)
- Légende californienne (c.1905; used in La belle excentrique)
- L'omnibus automobile (1905)
- Chez le docteur (1905)
- Allons-y Chochotte (1905)
- Rambouillet (Une réception à Rambouillet) (1907; survives without lyrics)
- Les oiseaux (Il nous prêtent leurs noms) (1907; survives without lyrics)
- Marienbad (Il portait un gilet) (1907; survives without lyrics)
- Psitt! Psitt! (1907)
- La chemise (Dépaquit) (1909; three versions)

== Compositions with multiple arrangements ==
- Trois sonneries de la Rose+Croix [3], fanfares for trumpets, harps and/or, possibly, orchestra (1892); version for solo piano (1892)
- Poudre d'or (1901): versions for orchestra and for solo piano
- Tendrement (1902): versions for voice and piano (cabaret song), for solo piano, and for orchestra
- Illusion (1902, after the song Tendrement): versions for orchestra and for solo piano
- Je te veux (published 1903): versions for voice and piano (cabaret song), for solo piano, and for orchestra
- La Diva de l'Empire (1904): versions for voice and piano (cabaret song), for solo piano (as Intermezzo américain, arrangement by H. Ourdine), and for orchestra
- Le Piccadilly (1904): versions for piano and strings, and for solo piano
- En habit de cheval (1911): versions for piano 4 hands and for orchestra
  1. Choral
  2. Fugue litanique
  3. Autre choral
  4. Fugue de papier
- L'aurore aux doigts de rose (1916): versions for orchestra and for piano 4 hands
- Trois petites pièces montées (1920): originally for orchestra; reduction for piano 4 hands published in 1920, orchestral score published in 1921
