= Aperçus désagréables =

Suite for piano duet by Erik Satie

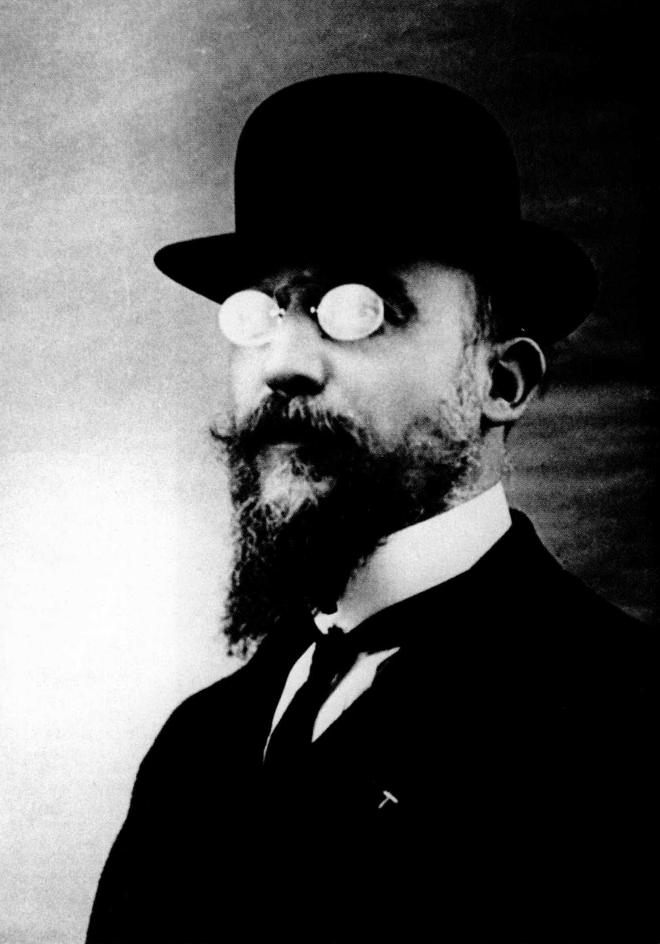
Erik Satie

Aperçus désagréables (Unpleasant Glimpses) is a suite for piano four hands composed between 1908 and 1912 by Erik Satie. It shows the early development of his mature style, a product of his studies at the Schola Cantorum de Paris. In performance it lasts about 5 minutes.

For its publication in 1913 Satie wrote, "The beautiful and limpid Aperçus désagréables...are written in the most superior style and enable us to understand why the subtle composer is justified in declaring: 'Before writing a work I go round it several times accompanied by myself'".

== Description ==
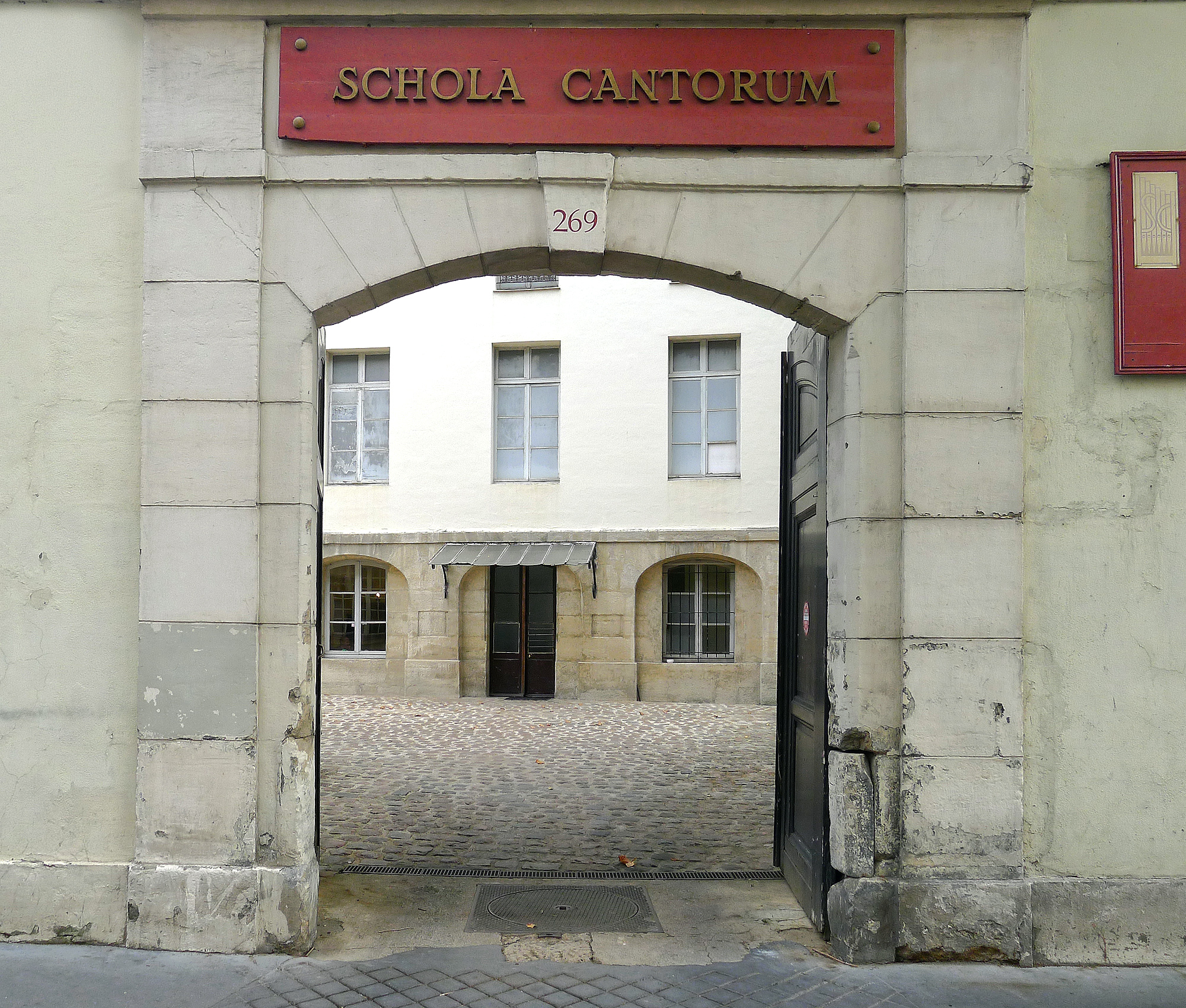
The Schola Cantorum de Paris

In the decade following the end of his Rose + Croix period (1895) Satie struggled to develop a viable new composing style, a goal his desultory studies at the Conservatoire de Paris had left him ill-prepared to achieve. In 1905, at 39, he enrolled as a student at the Schola Cantorum, where for the next seven years he studied counterpoint with Albert Roussel (1905-1908) and orchestration with Vincent d'Indy (1909-1912). His friend Claude Debussy and professor Roussel initially tried to dissuade him from this, fearing that at his age such academic training would spoil his originality. To which he replied, "At worst I will fail, and that will mean that I had nothing in me". At the Schola Satie acquired the contrapuntal skills and theoretical knowledge to move forward with a new creative aesthetic, one marked by economy, rigor, irony and wit. These would be hallmarks of his later music.

In June 1908 Satie received his Schola diploma in counterpoint with the distinction "Très Bien", and to test his new abilities at linear writing began work on what became the Aperçus désagréables. The suite consists of three piano duets with purely technical titles, written four years apart and in the opposite order of their presentation.

1. Pastorale – Assez lent (Pretty slow)
2. Choral – Large de vue (Wide view)
3. Fugue – Non vite (Not fast)

The Fugue was the first of the Aperçus to be completed, in August of 1908. It was written with Debussy in mind as the second pianist and he and Satie played the piece together the following month. On September 5 Debussy informed Portuguese composer Francisco de Lacerda that "your friend E. Satie has just finished a fugue in which boredom disguises itself behind wicked harmonies and in which you will recognize the influence of the [Schola]". It is a stern and sometimes contentious tête-à-tête between the two pianists, with droll playing directions to prove that late formal teaching had not dampened Satie's sense of humor. At one point where the players' right hands come close together the score reads, "Without naughtiness". Debussy must have been amused.

In the Choral, finished in September 1908, Satie concocted the formula for one of his favorite musical jokes. From here on he would use chorales to mock the stupid (namely his critics) and conformist, writing pieces that negated the form's primary function by being dissonant, unmelodic and, for all practical purposes, unsingable. Similar examples will be found in his En habit de cheval for orchestra (1912), the violin-piano suite Choses vues à droite et à gauche (sans lunettes) (1914), Sports et divertissements for solo piano (1914), the ballet Parade (in the revised version of 1919), and in attenuated form the intro to the song Spleen from his cycle Ludions (1923). He facetiously boasted, "My chorales equal those of Bach's with this difference: There are not so many of them, and they are less pretentious".

The Pastorale was not composed until October 1912. Marked in the score Very close and melancholy, it may be an "unpleasant glimpse" of how critics were reacting to his latest music. Having originally been considered an undisciplined amateur, Satie now saw his new learned style dismissed as academic and boring. A similar chill greeted his second collection of fugues and chorales, En Habit de cheval. But in September 1912, when E. Demets published his first humoristic piano suite Veritables Preludes flasques (pour un chien) and asked for more, Satie felt he was on the right creative track at last. The Pastorale was written to complete the suite in his preferred trinary form, and it was promptly sold. On November 23 Satie formally ended his studies at the Schola.

An early public performance of the Aperçus took place in Paris on January 19, 1914. Fourteen-year-old musical prodigy Georges Auric, accompanied by Jean Moulenq, played it as part of an all-Satie program. Auric became one of Satie's better-known protégés before their relations ended with a feud in 1924.

Apart from works for piano four hands Satie's output of instrumental chamber music is scarce (primarily 2 trumpet duets and the Choses vues for violin and piano). So it is interesting to learn that in August 1912 he intended to arrange the two original Aperçus for string quartet. He struggled through a "clumsy and much-corrected" sketch of the Choral before dropping the idea; he wouldn't tackle the form again, and this creative defeat apparently stayed with him. On his deathbed in 1925 Satie expressed regret that he had never written a string quartet.

== Recordings ==
Francis Poulenc and Jacques Février (Musidisc, 1950), Frank Glazer and Richard Deas (Candide, 1970), Jean Wiener and Jean-Joël Barbier (Universal Classics France, 1971, reissued 2002), Aldo Ciccolini (twice for EMI, overdubbing the second piano part himself in 1971 and paired with Gabriel Tacchino in 1988), Yūji Takahashi and Alain Planès (Denon, 1980), Wyneke Jordans and Leo van Doeselaar (Etcetera, 1983), Jean-Pierre Armengaud and Dominique Merlet (Mandala, 1990), Christian Ivaldi and Noël Lee (Arion, 1991), Anne Queffélec and Catherine Collard (Virgin Classics, 1993), Philippe Corre and Edoudard Exerjean (Disques Pierre Verany, 1993), Klára Körmendi and Gábor Eckhardt (Naxos, 1994), Duo Campion-Vachon (Fleurs de Lys, 1995), Olof Höjer and Max Lorstad (Swedish Society, 1996), Bojan Gorisek and Tatiana Ognjanovic (Audiophile Classics, 1999), Jean-Philippe Collard and Pascal Rogé (Decca, 2000), Katia and Marielle Labèque (KML, 2009), Sandra and Jeroen van Veen (Brilliant Classics, 2013).
