= Croquis et agaceries d'un gros bonhomme en bois =

Piano composition by Erik Satie

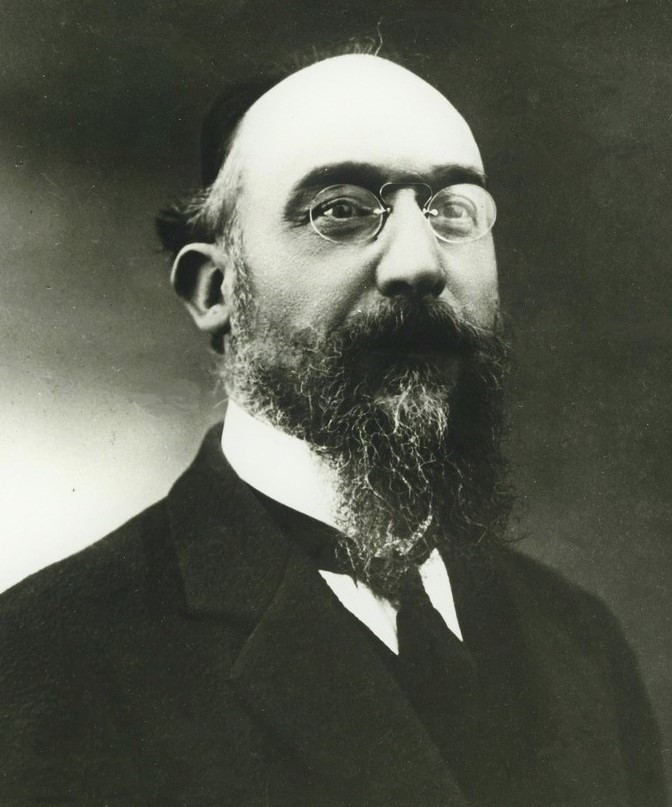
Erik Satie

Croquis et agaceries d'un gros bonhomme en bois, translated as Sketches and Exasperations of a Big Wooden Dummy, is a 1913 piano composition by Erik Satie. One of his pre-World War I humoristic suites, it was published by E. Demets that same year. Ricardo Viñes gave the premiere during a concert of the Société Nationale de Musique at the Salle Pleyel in Paris on March 28, 1914. A typical performance lasts about five minutes.

== Description ==
In the April 5, 1913 issue of the periodical Le Guide du concert, Satie advertised his plans to produce a series of pianistic works in which he would "devote myself to the sweet joys of fantasy", naming Descriptions automatiques, Embryons desséchés, Chapitres tournés en tous sens, and Vieux sequins et vieilles cuirasses as upcoming projects. He stuck to this scheme, with one detour. The first part of the unannounced Croquis et agaceries d'un gros bonhomme en bois was completed on June 2 and the rest intermittently worked on through August 25.

The "gros bonhomme en bois" ("Big Wooden Dummy") of the title is the composer himself. Normandy historian André Bruyère explored how Satie's childhood in Honfleur influenced his future creativity, and traced a link between this work and a street adjacent to his birthplace called rue de l'Homme-de-bois. When he played his Ogives at Le Chat Noir in 1889 Satie billed himself as "The composer with a wooden head". This later became a standing joke between Satie and his friend Claude Debussy.

The suite consists of three pieces marked Avec précaution et lent (Cautiously and slow), Assez lent, si vous le voulez bien (Quite slow, if you don't mind), and Sorte de valse (Sort of a waltz):

1. Tyrolienne turque (Turkish yodeling) – for Mademoiselle Elvira Viñes Soto
2. Danse maigre (à la manière de ces messieurs) Skinny dance (in the manner of those gentlemen) – for Monsieur Hernando Viñes Soto
3. Españaña – for Mademoiselle Claude Emma Debussy

If it has a running theme it would be what is now referred to as cultural appropriation, which for Satie would have been more grist for his irreverent humor mill. This is made explicit in the music and texts of the final movement.

=== 1. Tyrolienne turque ===
A genteel melody bookends the first piece; besides a single "wrong" note it is fit for a bourgeois French salon. An anticipatory bridge passage (to be played "With the tips of the eyes") leads to the "Turkish yodeling", a parody of the famous rondo alla turca from Mozart's Piano Sonata No. 11 with the theme converted from 2/4 to 3/4 time. Order is soon restored and the music ends delicately, wrong note and all.

=== 2. Danse maigre (à la manière de ces messieurs) ===
The idea for this curious dance was apparently inspired by the À la Manière de... series (1911-1913) of Italian composer Alfredo Casella, a collection of light keyboard pieces written "in the manner" of various musicians; and the title may be a parody of the popular Dance Nègre (1908) by Cyril Scott, known at the time as "The English Debussy". Satie was acquainted with both men through Debussy. Yet there are no musical allusions in the manner of anyone to be heard. The dance seems to bicker with itself through abrupt tempo changes and motivic juxtapositions ranging from quiet to frenetic. Satie's score advises the pianist to regard all this "From afar and with boredom" and "Full of subtlety, if you believe me". We never learn who the "skinny gentlemen" are supposed to be, though Satie scholars have had their theories.

=== 3. Españaña ===
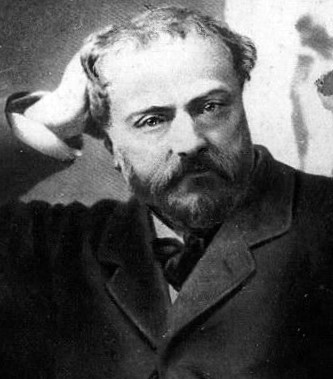
Emmanuel Chabrier

For the finale Satie spoofed the growing popularity of Spanish influences in French music. Debussy contributed to this trend with his Ibéria for orchestra (1908), and Satie may have been teasing him by dedicating the piece to Debussy's young daughter Chouchou. The title Españaña is a riff on Emmanuel Chabrier's rhapsody España (1883), playfully misspelled to read like a child's taunt.

To achieve a "Spanish" vibe Satie incongruously uses a waltz rhythm that occasionally stumbles, while the music veers into unexpected thematic and harmonic twists. The only thing resembling a "tune" occurs midway, an almost literal quotation of España.

In the preceding pieces Satie confined his literary wit to the cheeky "playing instructions"; here the texts form a narrative of disjunct imagery randomly sprinkled with Spanish words. Georges Bizet's operatic heroine Carmen is transported from Seville to modern-day Paris, where she people-watches while crossing the "Puerta" Maillot and the "Plaza" Clichy. When the España quote appears she asks "Is that the Alcalde?", a charming sign of Satie's respect for Chabrier. The piece ends with a personal joke: Carmen is offered cigarettes on the Rue de Madrid - the new home of the Conservatoire de Paris, against which former student Satie held a lifelong grudge.

The Croquis et agaceries d'un gros bonhomme en bois was popular in its day and has been frequently recorded. The first was by Satie's protégé Francis Poulenc in 1951.

In 1975 a Satie manuscript entitled San Bernardo was sold at auction from a private collection in Paris. Dated August 2, 1913, it is the rejected first version of Españaña (Croquis No. 3). The waltz rhythms are more assertive and it has the same España quote and reference to the Rue de Madrid. It was premiered in a studio recording by pianist Eve Egoyan on May 16, 2002, and the score was published in a limited edition that same year. A commercial edition appeared in 2016.

== Recordings ==
Notable recordings include those by Francis Poulenc (Columbia, 1951), Jean-Joël Barbier (BAM, 1967), Aldo Ciccolini (twice, for Angel in 1968 and EMI in 1987), Frank Glazer (Vox, 1968, reissued 1990), William Masselos (RCA, 1969), Yūji Takahashi (Denon, 1979), France Clidat (Forlane, 1980), Philippe Entremont (CBS, 1981), Jean-Pierre Armengaud (Le Chant du Monde, 1986), Anne Queffélec (Virgin Classics, 1988), Pascal Rogé (Decca, 1989), Yitkin Seow (Hyperion, 1989), Peter Lawson (EMI, 1989), Gabriel Tacchino (Disques Pierre Verany, 1993), Klára Körmendi (Naxos Records, 1994), Bojan Gorišek (Audiophile Classics, 1994), Olof Höjer (Swedish Society Discofil, 1996), Peter Dickinson (Olympia, 2001), Jean-Yves Thibaudet (Decca, 2003), Cristina Ariagno (Brilliant Classics, 2007), Jan Kaspersen (Scandinavian Classics, 2007), Alexandre Tharaud (Harmonia Mundi, 2009), Jeroen van Veen (Brilliant Classics, 2016), Noriko Ogawa (BIS, 2016), Steffan Schleiermacher (MDG, 2021).
