= En habit de cheval =

1911 suite for two pianos and orchestral work by Erik Satie

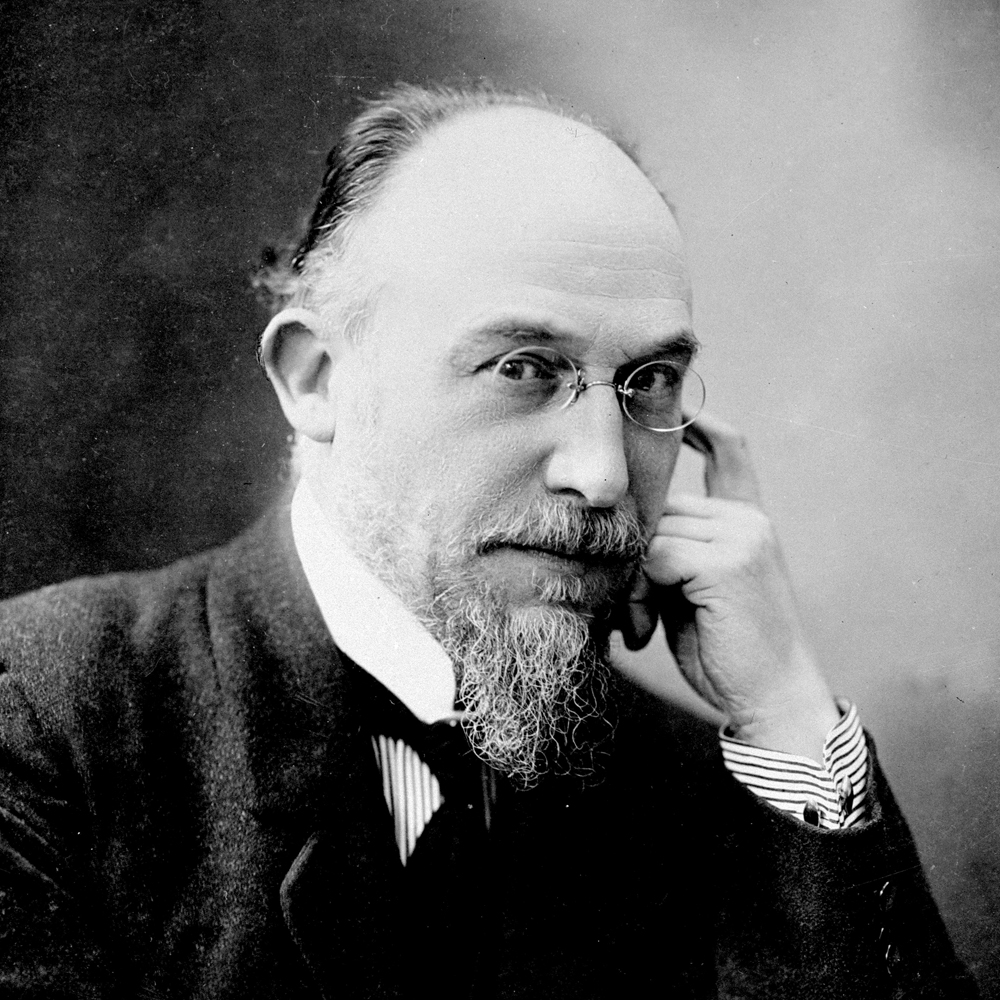
Erik Satie

En habit de cheval (In Riding Gear) is a 1911 suite for piano four hands by Erik Satie. He arranged it for orchestra that same year. It is a transitional work, composed towards the end of Satie's studies at the Schola Cantorum in Paris (1905-1912) and foreshadowing his pre-World War I "humoristic" or "fantaisiste" period. Robert Orledge wrote that "En habit de cheval offers the best example of Satie integrating Schola teaching with his own composition, and in it he also worked out his own individual concept of orchestration." In performance it lasts about 7 minutes.

== Composition history ==
The year 1911 was a turning point for Satie, when after decades of comparative obscurity he was suddenly thrust into the public eye. On 16 January Maurice Ravel played some of his early piano pieces at a concert sponsored by the progressive Société musicale indépendante (SMI), which began to promote him as an important precursor of modern trends in French music. This prompted Satie's friend (and Ravel's rival) Claude Debussy to conduct his 1896 orchestrations of the Gymnopédies at the Salle Gaveau on 25 March, an event that was enthusiastically received. Satie was given favorable attention in the Parisian press, publishers began to express interest in his music, and he attracted the first of his many young protégés, the 20-year-old composer and critic Alexis Roland-Manuel. Seizing on this opportunity to gain an audience for his newly developed contrapuntal style, he started work on En habit de cheval in June 1911.

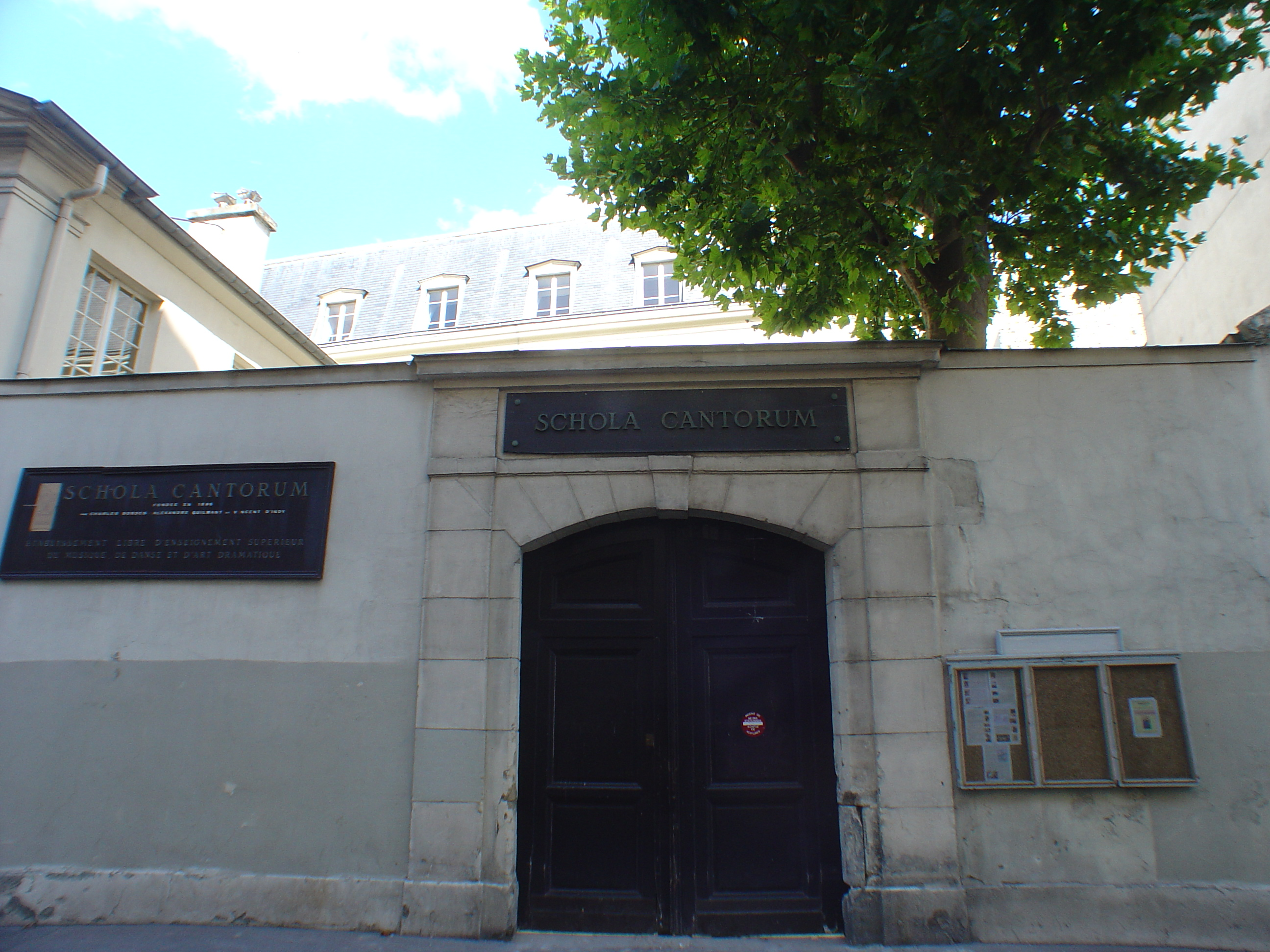
Schola Cantorum in Paris

The suite was conceived in a vein similar to Satie's first notable Schola-era composition, the 1908 chorale and fugue for piano duet Aperçus désagréables (Unpleasant Glimpses). At first he considered calling the new opus Divertissement, ironically suggesting a light entertainment, before deciding on the enigmatic title En habit de cheval. Satie later explained that the titular "riding gear" was not that of the rider but of the horse: "for instance...two shafts attached to a four-wheel carriage." This may have been his sly riposte to Schola director Vincent d'Indy, who had told him to "stick to the rules of the past" which he rebelliously overrode in this work.

Throughout the summer Satie kept Roland-Manuel informed of his progress, noting in a letter on 8 July that the "Habit de cheval fits me pretty well. I am working at it with the necessary calm; it is getting on coldly and turning over very satisfactorily." And on 4 August he happily described showing what he had written so far to his former counterpoint teacher at the Schola, Albert Roussel: "The whole thing entertained him. He has sided with me on this new conception of the fugue, especially the expositions. He loved its little harmonies". The suite was finished on 6 September, and thanks to his current notoriety he was able to sell it to Rouart, Lerolle & Cie three days later. It was published soon afterwards.

Encouraged by Roussel's approval and the quick sale of the original keyboard version, Satie immediately set about transcribing En habit de cheval for orchestra - his first mature attempt at the genre. Although he had acquired instrumental technique "on the job" producing arrangements for cabaret ensembles in the early 1900s, he had not been properly schooled in orchestration until his Schola studies with d'Indy, beginning in 1909. Now he felt ready to reveal his new technical abilities.

On 14 September Satie wrote to Roland-Manuel describing the instrumental forces he wanted to use for the work, and dropped some revealing hints about his scoring preferences. He said he "despised" the French horn and that one should never use more than two trumpets because, according to d'Indy, "three mean the end of the world." Satie later came to appreciate the practical uses of the horn in an orchestral setting, but he took d'Indy's curious advice about trumpets to heart and used only one or two in his subsequent large scores. The orchestral version was completed by the end of October 1911, and it was in this guise that En habit de cheval received its first performance.

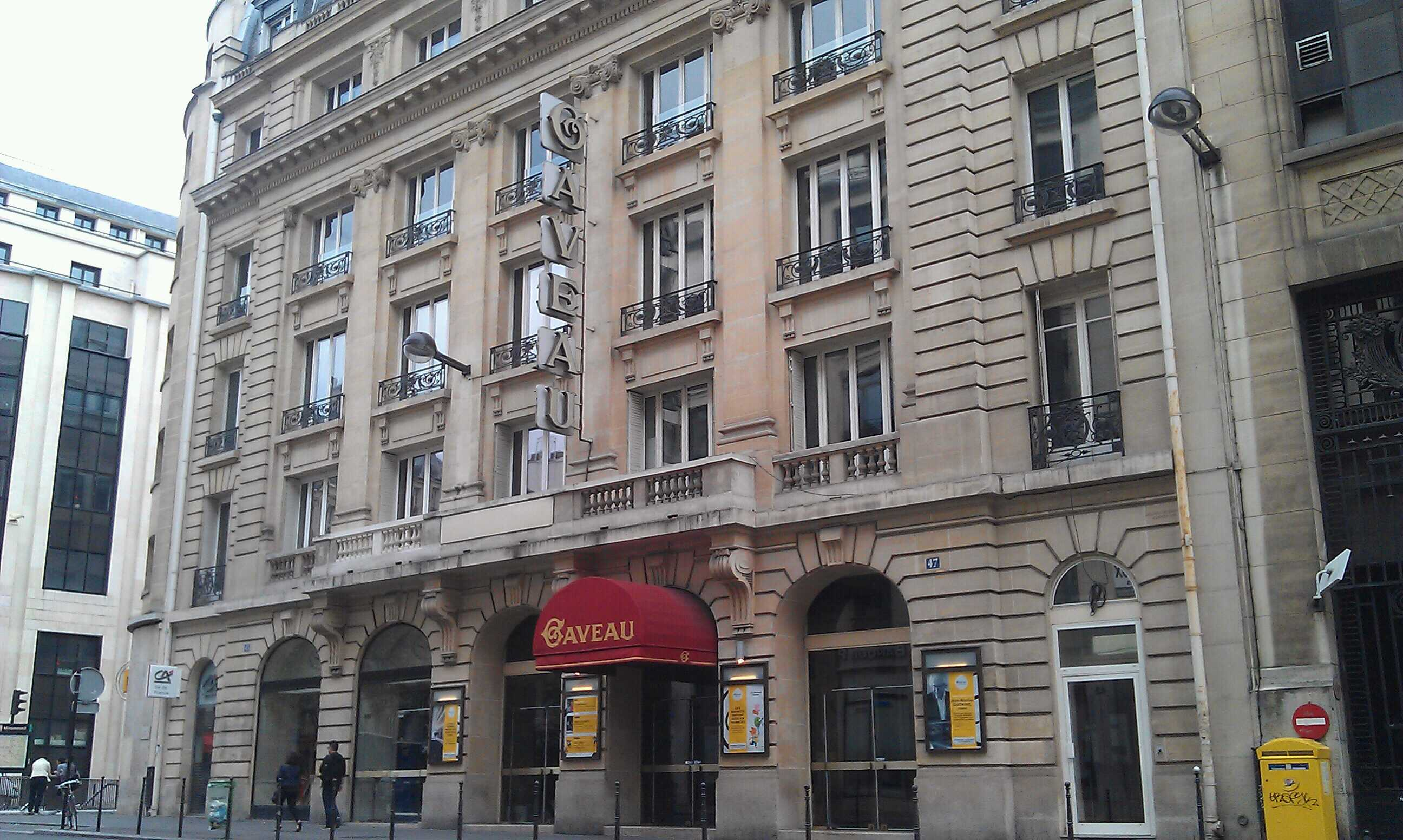
Salle Gaveau

The premiere took place at the Salle Gaveau on 17 June 1912 at a Société musicale indépendante event that also introduced Roland-Manuel's new orchestral arrangement of Satie's 1894 piano piece Prélude de la porte héroïque du ciel. For this occasion Satie wrote out all the instrumental parts for En habit de cheval himself, evidently because he could not afford a copyist, but in the end he chose not to appear at the concert. He later complained to his brother Conrad that, due to his pecuniary circumstances, he was too shabbily dressed to attend.

== Keyboard version ==
En habit de cheval consists of two interlocking pairs of chorales and fugues, Baroque forms as imaginatively reinvented by Satie:

1. Choral (Chorale) – Grave
2. Fugue litanique (Litany Fugue) – Soigneusement et avec lenteur (Carefully and Slowly)
3. Autre choral (Another Chorale) – Non lent (Not Slow)
4. Fugue de papier (Paper Fugue) – Assez modéré (Fairly Moderate)

Satie's irony is sharpest in the static, dissonant little chorales, which appear to negate the form's primary function by being unmelodic and, for all practical purposes, unsingable. He had minted this irreverent chorale formula in the Aperçus désagréables and would use it again in the violin-piano suite Choses vues à droite et à gauche (sans lunettes) (1914), Sports et divertissements for solo piano (1914), and the ballet Parade (in the revised version of 1919). The introductory chorale is impressive nonetheless, likened by pianist Olof Höjer to "some sort of grandiose portal" that guides the listener to the rest of the work.

The Fugue litanique wryly recalls the medieval and religious influences of Satie's 1890s "Rosicrucian" period, which he had long since rejected as "music on its knees." It is in Dorian mode and grounded in a droning plainsong-like subject. But the real tour de force is the ingeniously-constructed Fugue de papier, in which Satie inverts the classical fugue exposition: the subject begins on the subdominant, instead of the tonic, and is answered by the keynote. Satie was proud of this piece, claiming that his ability to create a "new, modern fugue" represented the culmination of his years of hard study.

== Orchestral version ==
The orchestral version of En habit de cheval is scored for 2 flutes, 1 oboe, 1 cor anglais, 2 clarinets in B♭, 2 bassoons, 1 sarrusophone, 2 horns in F, 2 trumpets in C, 3 trombones, 1 tuba, 1 contrabass tuba, and strings.

Satie experimented with different instrumental textures to give each piece a particular sound and carefully balance the dynamics of the whole. The sarrusophone helps add an amusingly plodding heft to the opening Choral, while the oboe is withheld until the concluding Fugue de papier. The 10-bar Autre choral is lightly scored for 5 single winds (flute, cor anglais, clarinet, bassoon, horn) and strings.

During his studies with d'Indy Satie took away the advice that "the writing has an influence on the sonority," and for his arrangement of En habit de cheval he fashioned a spare, sober orchestral style that complimented the austerity of the material. He would pursue and refine this style for the rest of his career. In an era when lushly scored Neo-romantic and Impressionist music still held sway in concert halls, Satie's "thin" orchestral sound put him at odds with his French contemporaries, some of whom ascribed it to incompetence. Jean Cocteau claimed that Impressionist musicians found Satie's orchestral music poor because "it had no sauce."

Satie's skills as an orchestrator have long been a subject of debate. Among his defenders, Robert Orledge has challenged the notion that in his pared-down handling of the medium Satie was simply "making a virtue of his technical limitations":

"Satie was never guilty of writing impossible parts for his players in later life (as Ravel was);
his sureness of inspiration meant that he never revised his orchestration once it was finished
(as Debussy did); and he was certainly never guilty of overscoring (as Richard Strauss and
Wagner were). If Satie avoided complexity, rhetoric, drama and sentimentality,
it was because he saw such post-Romantic characteristics as alien to the modern aesthetic."

Biographer Alan M. Gillmor characterized En habit de cheval as not one of Satie's "more endearing creations," but it stands as a milestone in the composer's development. Satie's quest for objectivity in musical expression, and his modern reinterpretations of old musical forms - both exemplified in En habit de cheval - were influential factors in the rise of Neoclassicism in France after World War I.

== Recordings ==
For piano four hands: Aldo Ciccolini recorded it twice for EMI, overdubbing the second piano part himself in 1971 and paired with Gabriel Tacchino in 1988. Other notable recordings are by Arthur Gold and Robert Fizdale (Columbia, 1954), Francis Poulenc and Jacques Février (Musidisc, 1959), Frank Glazer and Richard Deas (Candide, 1970), Jean Wiener and Jean-Joël Barbier (Universal Classics France, 1971, reissued 2002), Wyneke Jordans and Leo van Doeselaar (Etcetera, 1983), Jean-Pierre Armengaud and Dominique Merlet (Mandala, 1990), Philippe Corre and Edoudard Exerjean (Disques Pierre Verany, 1992), Klára Körmendi and Gábor Eckhardt (Naxos Records, 1994), Bojan Gorisek and Tatiana Ognjanovic (Audiophile Classics, 1999), Jean-Philippe Collard and Pascal Rogé (Decca, 2000), Sandra and Jeroen van Veen (Brilliant Classics, 2013).

For orchestra: Manuel Rosenthal, French National Radio And Television Orchestra (Everest, 1968), Maurice Abravanel, Utah Symphony Orchestra (Vanguard, 1968), Michel Plasson - Orchestre Du Capitole De Toulouse (EMI, 1988).
