= Les Pantins dansent =

Composition by Erik Satie

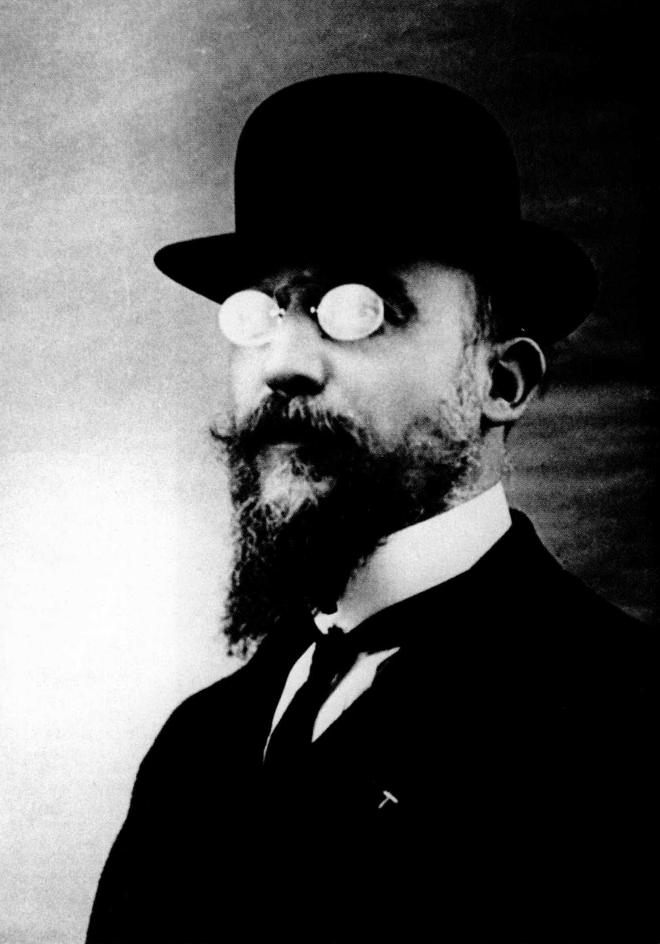
Erik Satie

Les Pantins dansent (The Puppets are Dancing) is a "poème dansé" for small orchestra or piano composed in 1913 by Erik Satie. It was commissioned for an experimental theatrical event starring Futurist author and dancer Valentine de Saint-Point. Maurice Droeghmans conducted the premiere at the Salle Léon-Poirier (now the Théâtre de la Comédie des Champs-Elysées) in Paris on December 20, 1913.

A typical performance of the piece lasts under two minutes. It is most often heard in its version for solo piano.

== Background ==
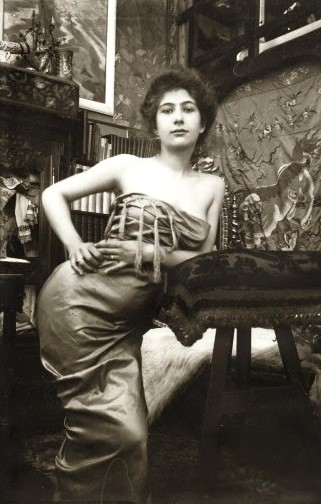
Valentine de Saint-Point as a model in the early 1900s

Little known today, Valentine de Saint-Point was a prototypical female performance artist. The great-grandniece of poet Alphonse de Lamartine, she was widowed at 24 and went to Paris to model for Rodin and Alphonse Mucha. In 1903 she left her wealthy second husband, moved in with struggling author Ricciotto Canudo after the divorce, and started a literary salon that eventually became a magnet for modernist Paris. She published poetry, essays and plays and caused a mild scandal with her novel An Incest (1907), illustrated by Rodin, about a mother initiating her son to sex. In 1909 Canudo and Filippo Tommaso Marinetti accepted her as the first woman in their male-dominated Futurist movement. Saint-Point's Manifesto of Futurist Women (1912) was her reply to Marinetti's misogynist theories, followed by the even more sensational Futurist Manifesto of Lust (1913), both of which she read in controversial spoken word appearances.

New French music was one of Saint-Point's many interests. Debussy and Ravel attended her salon and Satie's Trois morceaux en forme de poire had its first known performance there in June 1912. When she invited Satie to compose Les Pantins Dansent for her upcoming interdisciplinary Festival de la Métachorie in 1913, he was intrigued by the concept and eagerly agreed.

With her Metachoric Festival Saint-Point hoped to achieve a modern synthesis of the arts through unsentimental abstraction and differing creative viewpoints. As she explained, "music and dance are equal partners, both uniquely and similarly dependent on the Idea, that is to say the idea evoked in the poem or drama." In a "poème dansé" a poem would be read before the curtain, followed by the separately inspired interpretations of that poem by composer and dancer onstage. By writing the poems herself as well as choreographing them Saint-Point was less than faithful to this approach; but it was still a theoretical advance from the free improvisational dances of her contemporaries Isadora Duncan, Maud Allan and Loie Fuller, and would anticipate the experiments of composer John Cage and choreographer Merce Cunningham in the 1950s.

== Music ==
Satie composed his score during the first half of November 1913. The poem Saint-Point chose for him to interpret, Les Pantins Dansent, was later published in her book Poèmes ironiques (1917). An interior monologue of suicidal contemplation, it begins and ends with the same stanza:

I will die on a feast day
While the puppets dance.
I won't dance with them,
I won't celebrate with them.
I will die on a feast day
While the puppets dance.

As a professional musician Satie had worked with inferior poetry and managed to make art from some of it (his early collaborations with Contamine de Latour, a handful of his cabaret songs). But Saint-Point's verse somehow nudged the ironist in him. He clearly found the puppets more "inspiring" than the author's self-pitying angst. Earlier that year Satie had written his surreal one-act comedy Le piège de Méduse, in which the musical interludes were to be danced by a mechanical monkey, but his fascination with puppetry dated from childhood and first bore fruit in his attempts to create shadow plays for Montmartre cabarets.

Two distinct versions of Les Pantins dansent exist. In Version I a jarring, discordant introduction segues into a jaunty quick march bearing a resemblance to the old English song Cherry Ripe, neither of which reflect the poem with any real earnestness. Satie sketched the orchestration, for 2 flutes, clarinet in B♭, bassoon, horn, 2 trumpets, harp and strings, before deciding to start over. He may have been pulling Saint-Point's leg and thought better of it, or Saint-Point heard the work in progress and demanded a rewrite.

Version II, completed on November 16, is the work we know today. Apart from the scoring - Satie dropped the harp, second flute and second trumpet, and added an oboe - the changes were more of tone than structure, suggesting he had a set plan in mind. The dissonant original opening was replaced with a grumpy-sounding intro led by the bassoon; the jauntiness of the middle section is still there but much subdued. Both versions simply peter out at the end. That Satie remained true to his own stylistic principles really comes through in the piano reduction. Despite its avant-garde pedigree Les Pantins dansent could easily have sneaked out from one of his humoristic keyboard suites of the period.

== Performance and publication ==
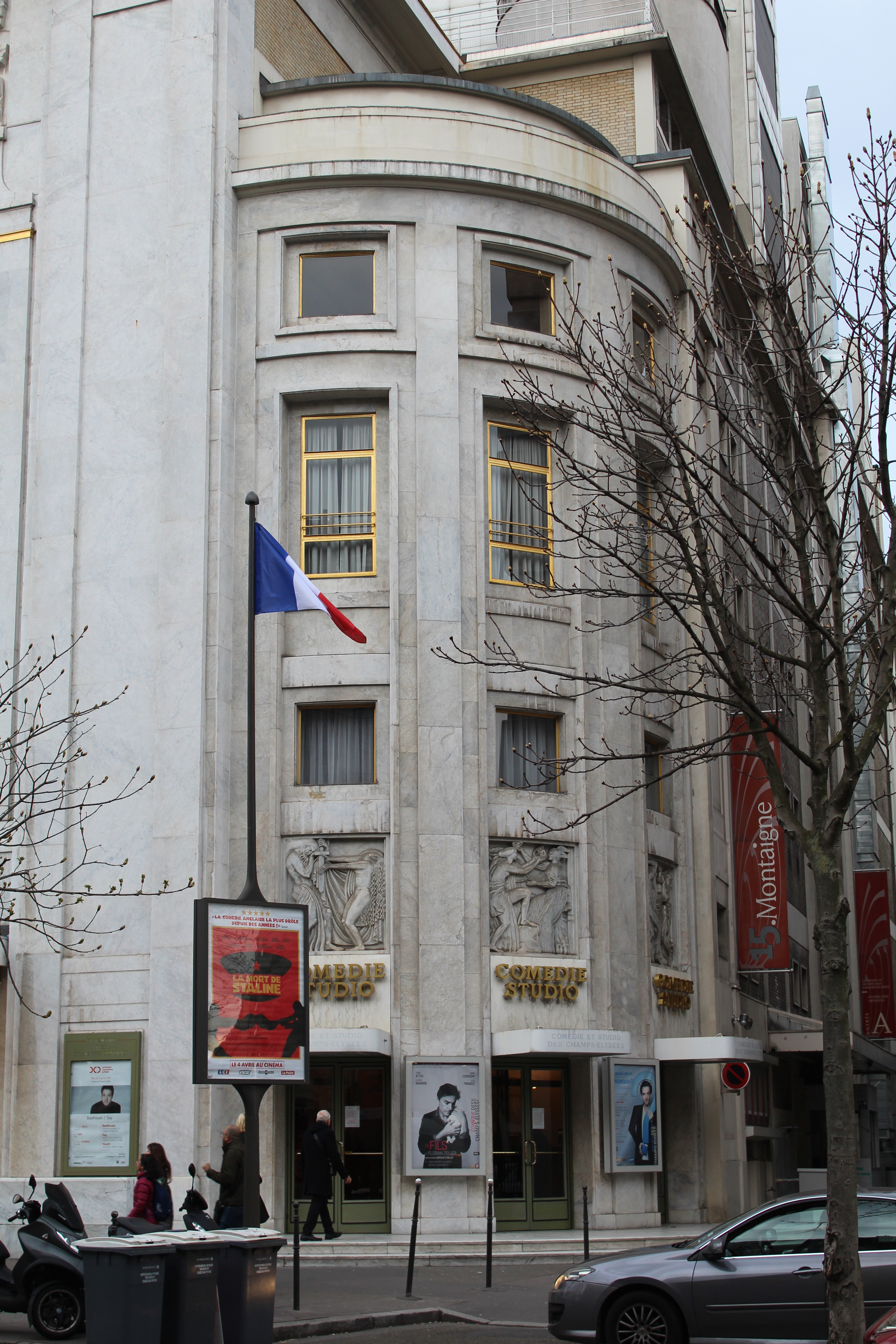
Entrance to the Comédie stage of the Théâtre des Champs-Élysées, site of the first Metachoric Festival (1913)

The December 1913 Metachoric Festival was a 90-minute performance in three parts, "Poems of Love", "Poems of Air", and "Poems of War". Music for the second tableaux consisted of Debussy's La Damoiselle élue and two Satie pieces: Les Pantins dansent and a prelude from Le Fils des étoiles, the latter orchestrated by Saint-Point's young protégé Daniel Chennevière (later known as astrologer Dane Rudhyar) and retitled Hymne au Soleil. Florent Schmitt, Alexis Roland-Manuel and Chennevière provided the other musical numbers.

The smell of incense wafted through the hall as actor Édouard de Max declaimed each poem from the wings; Saint-Point then executed her solo dances, at times naked beneath diaphanous veils of tulle and silk. Multi-colored light flooded the stage and the scenery took the form of geometric patterns projected onto backdrops. For Les Pantins dansent the dancer was bathed in pink hues.

Reviews were mixed. Critics admired Saint-Point's looks and imagination but observed she was untrained as a dancer, with one scribe comparing her choreographic style to "Swedish gymnastics". It was generally agreed that the music and lighting effects were the real stars of the show. Satie was uncharacteristically silent about his role in the production. It is not known if he approved the printing of an extract from his orchestral score in the November–December issue of Canudo's Futurist magazine Montjoie!, or of the complete piano version in the following number (January–February 1914). He moved onto other projects without looking back.

Barely a month after this event Saint-Point publicly broke with the Futurists, claiming she belonged to no movement, and her salon ended with the start of World War I. Seeking new fortune in America, she revived her Metachoric Festival at the Metropolitan Opera in New York City on April 3, 1917. The Satie-Chennevière Hymne an Soleil kept its place on the revised program, but Les Pantins Dansent was omitted. Byron Hagel of the Musical Courier found the whole thing ridiculous and noted that halfway through the event spectators were heading for the exits. Critics said nothing about Satie's music but had praise for the conductor, Pierre Monteux.

Satie made no attempt to publish Les Pantins dansent during his lifetime. A standard performance edition of Version II for piano was issued by Rouart-Lerolle in 1929; the orchestral score appeared in 1967 (Salabert). Version I for piano was reconstructed and premiered by Robert Orledge at the Williamson Art Gallery in Birkenhead on June 17, 1990. It was published in 2016.

== Recordings ==
For piano:

Notable recordings include those by Aldo Ciccolini (twice, for Angel in 1968 and EMI in 1987), Frank Glazer (Vox, 1968), France Clidat (Forlane, 1980), Jean-Pierre Armengaud (Le Chant du Monde, 1986), Anne Queffélec (Virgin Classics, 1988), Gerhard Erber (Eterna, 1989), João Paulo Santos (Classical Gallery, 1992), Klára Körmendi (Naxos Records, 1994), Bojan Gorišek (Audiophile Classics, 1994), Olof Höjer (Swedish Society Discofil, 1996), Pascal Rogé (Decca, 1997), Jean-Yves Thibaudet (Decca, 2003), Håkon Austbø (Brilliant Classics, 2006), Cristina Ariagno (Brilliant Classics, 2007), Alexandre Tharaud (Harmonia Mundi, 2009), Steffen Schleiermacher (MDG, 2012), Jeroen van Veen (Brilliant Classics, 2016), Noriko Ogawa (BIS, 2021).

For orchestra:

Friedrich Cerha, Ensemble "Die Reihe" (Vox, 1968), Yutaka Sado, Orchestre des Concerts Lamoureux (Erato, 2001), Jean-Pierre Wallez, Orchestre Régional de Basse-Normandie (Skarbo, 2014).
