= Les Trois Valses distinguées du précieux dégoûté =

1914 musical work by Erik Satie

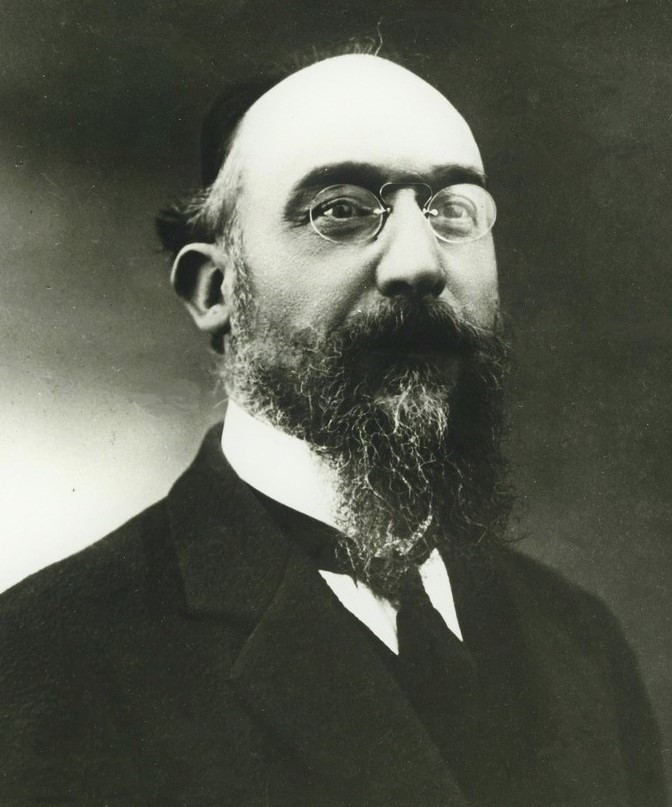
Erik Satie

Les Trois Valses distinguées du précieux dégoûté (The Three Distinguished Waltzes of a Jaded Dandy) is a 1914 piano composition by Erik Satie. The shortest of his humoristic keyboard suites of the 1910s, it features what author James Harding called "the most baroque verbal scaffolding Satie ever erected around his music". A performance lasts around 3 minutes.

== Background ==
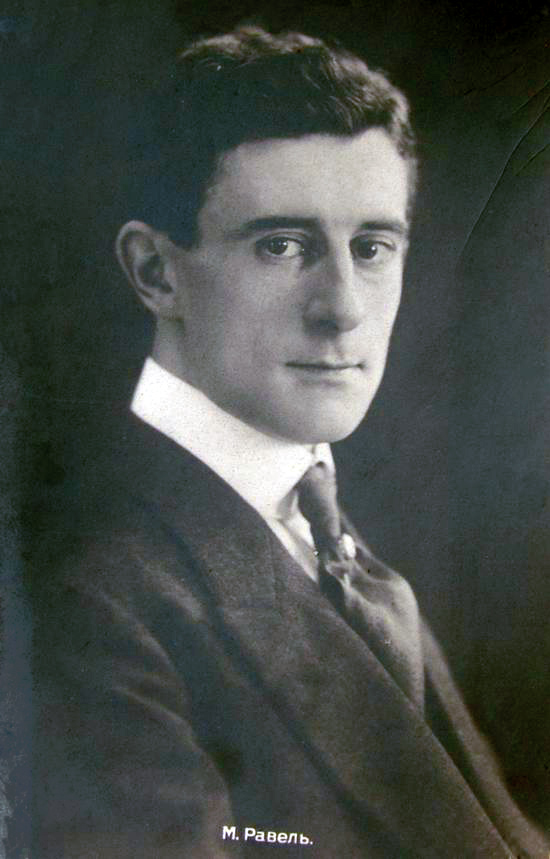
Maurice Ravel in 1910

According to the manuscripts the Valses distinguées were completed at the rate of one per day, from July 1 to 3, 1914. That summer, Satie was distancing himself from the new Société musicale indépendante (SMI) and one of its leaders, Maurice Ravel. Both had been responsible for bringing the obscure composer to mainstream public attention in 1911, and Ravel would always consider him a great early influence on his work.

But he and Satie had little in common, despite having been acquaintances since Ravel's student days in the early 1890s. The SMI's promotion of young or "undiscovered" musicians was done partly at the expense of Satie's best friend (and Ravel's chief rival) Claude Debussy, causing a permanent strain in their relationship that would end bitterly in 1917. Internecine politics had already compelled Satie to quit writing for the SMI's monthly revue, where most of his celebrated Mémoires d'un amnésique (Memoirs of an Amnesiac) sketches were first published (1912–1914).

The eponymous "Jaded Dandy" of this suite is almost certainly Ravel, whose sartorial refinement was well-known in Paris, and the music was Satie's nose-thumbing answer to Ravel's popular Valses nobles et sentimentales (1910-1911). Burning bridges and "ghosting" friends and colleagues became marked habits of Satie's later years, and in this case there was collateral damage: When his protégé Alexis Roland-Manuel (dedicatee of the first piece in this set) drew closer to Ravel after the war, Satie parted company with him as well. His last public statement about his former benefactor was this 1920 mot: "Ravel refuses the Legion of Honor, but all his music accepts it".

== Music and texts ==
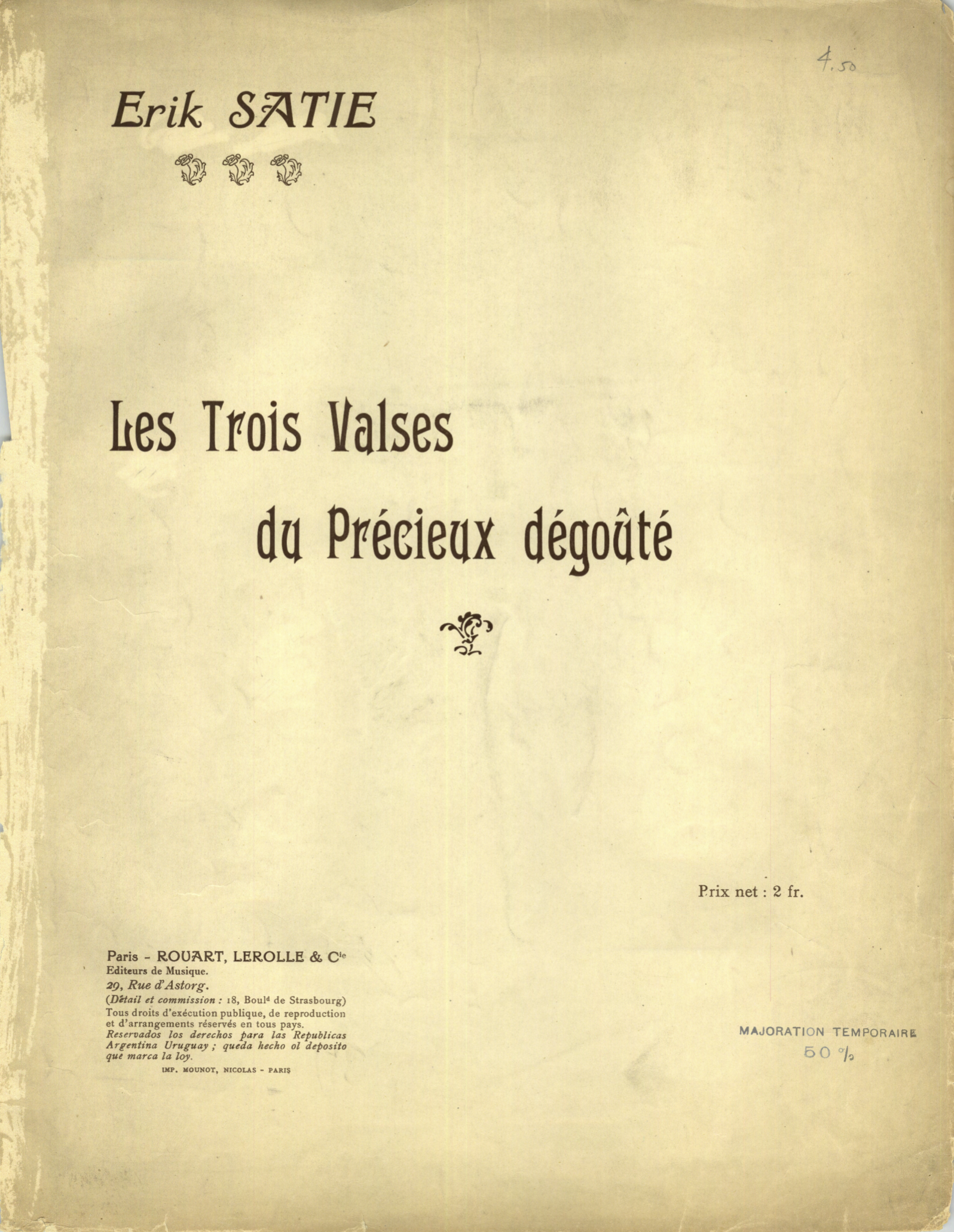
Cover of the first edition (1916)

The Valses distinguées is a musical portrait of a dandy from three perspectives: His waist; his pince-nez; and his legs. Each piece is prefaced by a classical quotation and the scores are threaded with Satie's ironic paeans to the fop's narcissism. Critics have expressed bewilderment over this seemingly random montage of texts that, unlike those of the other humoristic piano suites, appear to have no relation to the music; but nothing is arbitrary here. The literary quotations meant something to Satie and there are personal links, even if they were only used for the composer's private amusement.

Musically there is nothing descriptive about the pieces and, apart from the second waltz, no quotes or allusions. Biographer Rollo H. Myers admired the elegance and clarity of Satie's craftsmanship: "Despite the absence of bar lines the stresses, often cunningly displaced, fall naturally into place, and each piece is impeccably 'cut' and shaped. The harmonies, never thicker than three voices, are original as only Satie's harmonies can be, and characteristically dry..." Some passages are bitonal, a technique still something of a novelty in 1914. Of all Satie's works of this period, the valses distinguées can probably stand alone best as absolute music.

The three pieces are:

1. Sa Taille (His waist) – for Alexis Roland-Manuel
2. Son Binocle (His pince-nez) – for Mademoiselle Linette Chalupt
3. Ses Jambes (His legs) – for René Chalupt

=== 1. Sa Taille ===
Those that harm the reputation or the fortune of others rather than forgo a witticism, deserve degrading punishment. This needed to be said, and I am prepared to say it.

— La Bruyère, Les Caractères

Satie quotes La Bruyère with tongue firmly in cheek, as he was never one to forgo a witticism. In fact he would face his own "degrading punishment" in 1917 when he was convicted of criminal libel for sending insulting postcards to a music critic, calling him (among other things) "a most unmusical asshole". The commentary depicts the dandy humming a 15th Century tune as he looks in the mirror, confident with his good looks and chances of seducing an aristocratic lady that night. He puts an arm around his waist in a gesture of triumphant self-satisfaction. "Is it not written thus?" the text inquires.

=== 2. Son Binocle ===
Our ancient custom forbade pubescent youths to show themselves naked in the baths, and modesty thus took deep root in our souls.

— Cicero, De re publica

In Ancient Greece the word "gymnopédie" stood for "naked youth", and Cicero's quote about boys in the baths leads us to some then-recent history about the Gymnopédies. It was one of the compositions Ravel featured in his groundbreaking 1911 Satie SMI program, a fact Satie no longer appreciated; he was also irritated by Ravel's claim (intended as a homage) that the waltz-like Les entretiens de la belle et de la bête from his Ma mère l'Oye (1910) was "the fourth Gymnopédie". For the only time in the suite preface and music unite for a common end. The opening of Son binocle identifiably recalls (though doesn't actually quote) the limpid soundscapes of the Gymnopédies – but in the faster tempo Ravel preferred when playing them. For Ornella Volta this was Satie's cryptic way of telling Ravel "You know nothing about me".

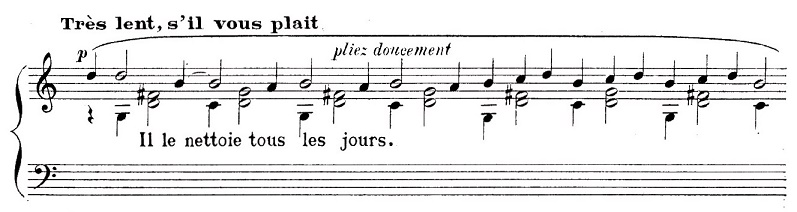

The text shows the dandy cleaning his luxurious pince-nez, a gift from a beautiful woman; he is disconsolate because he lost its case. With the focus on the pince-nez – which Satie ubiquitously wore and Ravel never did – it would be easy to assume Satie was poking fun at himself. And it would also be on brand for his mystifying wit to plant a red herring that would throw people off the scent of his true intentions.

=== 3. Ses Jambes (His legs) ===
The owner's first concern when he arrives at his farm should be to greet his household Penates; then the same day, if he has time, he should walk round his property; he should see what state his crops are in; what work has been done, and what has not.

— Cato, De re rustica

More Satiean irony underscores Cato's dictum on a landowner's responsibilities. It was one of Satie's deadpan jokes, especially in writings such as the Mémoires d'un amnésique, to make casual references to his "estates" and servants. When his old friend George Auriol asked if he was still living in Arcueil, Satie replied "I'm afraid so...I can't find any place suitable in Paris. I need something huge, you understand...30 rooms at least...I've got so many ideas to house!" No doubt these ideas occupied his mind as he sat in his squalid one-room apartment, drawing fanciful pictures of châteaux and castles on tiny scraps of paper.

Meanwhile an absurd little prose poem tells us of the dandy's infatuation with his own legs. In the evenings they are dressed in black and dance only the best dances. He kisses them and puts them around his neck, but his legs are resentful because he can't carry them under his arm. The dandy refuses to buy gaiters, comparing them to "a prison".

== Premiere ==
The appearance of Les Trois Valses distinguées was delayed by the outbreak of World War I. It was premiered by the composer at the Salle Huyghens in Paris on November 19, 1916, during an exhibition of African and modern art sponsored by the Société Lyre et Palette; paintings by Matisse, Picasso, Modigliani and Kisling were featured. Rouart-Lerolle published the score that same year. It remains one of Satie's more popular piano suites and has been frequently recorded.

== Recordings ==
Notable recordings include those by Jean-Joël Barbier (BAM, 1967), Aldo Ciccolini (twice, for Angel in 1968 and EMI in 1987), Frank Glazer (Vox, 1968, reissued 1990), Yūji Takahashi (Denon, 1979), Daniel Varsano (CBS, 1979), France Clidat (Forlane, 1980), Philippe Entremont (CBS, 1981), Jean-Pierre Armengaud (Le Chant du Monde, 1986), Roland Pöntinen (BIS, 1986), Anne Queffélec (Virgin Classics, 1988), Pascal Rogé (Decca, 1989), Yitkin Seow (Hyperion, 1989), Peter Lawson (EMI, 1989), Gabriel Tacchino (Disques Pierre Verany, 1993), Klára Körmendi (Naxos Records, 1994), Bojan Gorišek (Audiophile Classics, 1994), Olof Höjer (Swedish Society Discofil, 1996), Peter Dickinson (Olympia, 2001), Jean-Yves Thibaudet (Decca, 2003), Håkon Austbø (Brilliant Classics, 2006), Francine Kay (Analekta, 2006), Cristina Ariagno (Brilliant Classics, 2007), Jan Kaspersen (Scandinavian Classics, 2007), Marco Rapetti (Dynamic, 2007), Alexandre Tharaud (Harmonia Mundi, 2009), Jeroen van Veen (Brilliant Classics, 2016), Noriko Ogawa (BIS, 2016), Steffen Schleiermacher (MDG, 2021).
