= Enfantines =

Piano pieces composed by Erik Satie

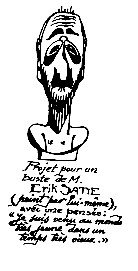
Erik Satie, self-portrait sketch with his quote, "I came into the world very young, in an age that was very old"

The Enfantines are three sets of beginner piano pieces by Erik Satie, "written with the aim of preparing children for the sound patterns of modern music." They were composed in October 1913 and published the following year. Two additional sets were published posthumously.

== Description ==
Many of Satie's contemporaries spoke of his essentially childlike nature. He identified with children, and his respect for their innocence and naiveté has been related to his own quest for purity and directness in music. From 1908 to 1910 he ran a charity group in his hometown of Arcueil to take orphans and poorer boys and girls on country outings; and on Sunday mornings he gave them solfège lessons and improvised melodies with funny titles to make them laugh. This side of Satie found its most direct creative expression in the Enfantines, music his first biographer Pierre-Daniel Templier described as not "about children, or for children, but of a child."

These are genuine children's pieces, crafted for small hands, with simple themes that can be easily learned. Each set is built on a different five-finger scale, using only the white keys of the piano. Menus propos enfantins serves as a sort of introduction. There is greater rhythmic variety in the Enfantillages pittoresques while the Peccadilles importunes have more dissonant harmonies and varied tempi. Thus, according to pianist Olof Höjer, "the music is gradually more advanced and the degree of technical difficulty increases."

As with his humoristic piano suites of the period (1912-1915), Satie's eccentric wit is evident in the titles and playful narratives appended to the Enfantines. He avoids didacticism in order to give his young pupils "the freedom to engage in the music through play...Satie hoped to have children learn without knowing they were doing so. Indeed, these pieces were designed — visually, musically, textually, and physically — with the delight of the child in mind."

Satie never lost his devotion to young people and the promise of the future they represented. This later manifested itself in his support of the budding composers who made up Les Six and the "Arcueil School". Towards the end of his life he told Darius Milhaud, "I should so much like to know what kind of music the children who are now four years old will write."

== Original Enfantines ==
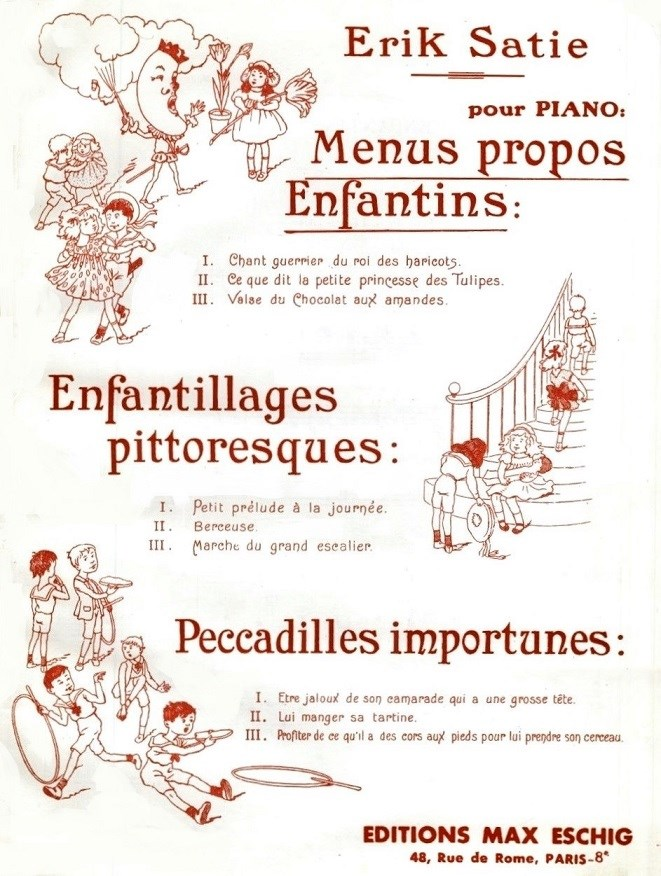
Title page of the first edition (1914) of Satie's Enfantines

=== Menus propos enfantins (Childish Small Talk) ===
1. Le chant guerrier du roi des haricots

(The Warrior Song of the King of Beans)

2. Ce que dit la petite princesse des tulipes

(What the Little Princess of Tulips Said)

3. Valse du chocolat aux amandes

(Chocolate Waltz with Almonds)

Dated October 10, 1913, and dedicated to Valentine Gross. The pieces are marked Mouvt. de Marche (march tempo), Très lent (very slowly), and Valse (Waltz).

Satie's texts for movements 1 and 2 deal with imaginary royalty. First we are offered a sketch of the jolly King of Beans and his brave horse, who likes dancing, war and bullets. The Little Tulip Princess speaks softly because her doll has a headache, having fallen from the third floor ("The doctor says it's nothing"). The third story is a dialogue between a mother and her young son. The "greedy" boy thinks he finds a bone in his chocolate ("No, my little one, it's an almond") and throws a tantrum when he's not allowed to eat the whole box.

=== Enfantillages pittoresques (Picturesque Child's Play) ===
1. Petit prélude à la journée

(Little Prelude to the Day)

2. Berceuse

(Lullaby)

3. Marche du grand escalier

(March of the Grand Staircase)

Dated October 22, 1913, and dedicated to Madame Leon Verveuil. The first two pieces are marked Modéré (moderately) and Lent (slow); the Marche is in standard 2/4 time.

The annotations for the Petit prélude are a matter-of-fact itinerary that Satie certainly followed himself ("Wake up...Brush your hair well...Go for a good walk"), while in the Berceuse little Pierrot is tucked in for the night by his mother. She assures him his grandparents will know he was a good boy - they'll see it in the newspaper. In the Marche a king has built a 1000-step ivory staircase so beautiful that people are afraid to use it. The king himself leaves his room by jumping out the window. He is so fond of the staircase he wants to have it stuffed.

=== Peccadilles importunes (Tiresome Pranks) ===
1. Être jaloux de son camarade qui a une grosse tête

(Being jealous of a friend who has a big head)

2. Lui manger sa tartine

(Eating up his bread and jam)

3. Profiter de ce qu'il a des cors aux pieds pour lui prendre son cerceau

(Taking advantage of his corns to steal his hoop)

Dated October 26, 1913, and dedicated to Marguerite Long. The pieces are marked Andante (moderately slow), Lent, and Un peu vif (a little lively).

For this set Satie's texts assume a faux-moralizing tone, with admonitions such as "Those who are jealous are unhappy," "The Good Lord will be angry if he sees this," and "Never do this unless someone tells you to." The commentator of Lui manger sa tartine remarks on the temptations of stealing someone else's bread and jam, then mentions that his dog secretly smoked all his cigars and got a bellyache from them.

== Posthumous Enfantines ==
=== Trois Nouvelles Enfantines (Three New Enfantines) ===
1. Le vilain petit vaurien

(The Ugly Little Rascal)

2. Berceuse

(Lullaby)

3. La gentille toute petite fille

(The Nice Little Girl)

These pieces were composed in early October 1913. Satie's notebooks show the care and self-critical attitude he devoted to his children's music, with material ranging from possible fingering trials to neat copies of pieces he ultimately rejected. Musicologist Nigel Wilkins edited three of the latter and published them as Trois Nouvelles Enfantines in 1972. Olof Höjer felt the first two in particular have "a flavor of two-part, chromatic inventions" and speculated they may have derived from unused material of Satie's early Schola Cantorum period (1905-1908).

=== L’Enfance de Ko-Quo (Ko-Quo’s Childhood) ===
1. Ne bois pas ton chocolat avec tes doigts

(Don't drink chocolate with your fingers)

2. Ne souffle pas dans tes oreilles

(Don't blow in your ears)

3. Ne mets pas ta tête sous ton bras

(Don’t put your head under your arm)

Subtitled Recommendations maternelles (Motherly Advice) and dated September 27–28, 1913, L’Enfance de Ko-Quo was the first projected set of Enfantines Satie completed. He never published it, possibly because he felt it was too sophisticated for children. It covers a wider keyboard range, including the black keys. Ornella Volta discovered the manuscript in a private collection and published the texts in her edition of Satie's literary writings A Mammal's Notebook (1996, reprinted 2014); she edited the score for publication in 1999. Volta suggested that the unique name "Ko-Quo" may be a childish pronunciation of "Que quoi?" ("What’s that?").

== Recordings ==
Recordings of the Enfantines have been primarily confined to more comprehensive editions of Satie's piano music, including those by Aldo Ciccolini, France Clidat, Jean-Pierre Armengaud, Jean-Joël Barbier, Olof Höjer, Klára Körmendi, and Jean-Yves Thibaudet.
