= Salut drapeau! =

Composition by Eric Satie

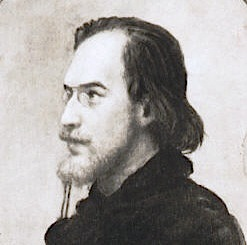
Erik Satie

Salut drapeau! (Hail to the Flag!), also known as Hymne Pour Le "Salut Drapeau", is an incidental music piece composed in November 1891 by Erik Satie for the historical drama Le Prince du Byzance by Joséphin Péladan. One of the more eccentric works of Satie's "Rosicrucian" period (1891–1895), it was the first example of his "static sound décor" approach to theatre music. The score went unperformed in his lifetime and was not published until 1968. Its duration is roughly four minutes.

Satie alternately set Péladan's text for organ and a unison chorus of female voices, or for solo vocalist with piano accompaniment. Live performances and recordings have opted for the latter. He was also said to have composed a Prelude for the play, but it was either lost or never started.

== Description ==
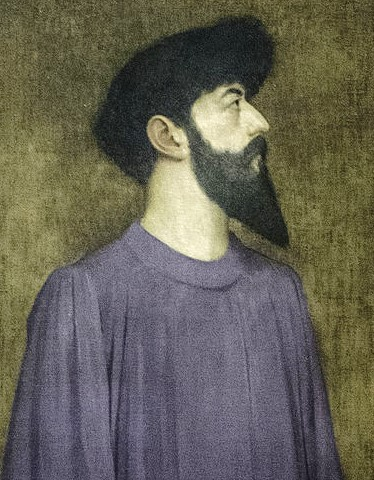
Joséphin Péladan

Salut drapeau! was written at the start of Satie's new position as official composer and chapelmaster of Péladan's splinter group the Mystic Order of the Rose + Croix. As a bohemian cabaret pianist eager to become known as a composer, Satie welcomed the publicity this association would bring him in Parisian artistic circles. However his contribution to Le Prince du Byzance – his debut attempt at dramatic music – would characteristically defy all conventional expectations.

Péladan's "Romanesque Drama in Five Acts" takes place in Renaissance Italy during the reign of King Ferdinand I of Naples. Army captain Giorgio Cavalcanti is ordered by Ferdinand to fetch 15 year-old Tonio, the hereditary Prince of Taranto, from a Dominican monastery. Cavalcanti falls in love with the curiously androgynous Tonio, who uses the captain and his troops to seize Taranto independently rather than serve as a puppet ruler for the King. Royal retribution is swift and the defeated Cavalcanti lives just long enough to learn that Tonio is a woman, having been named and raised (at Ferdinand's orders) as a boy in a monastery for her protection. She is forgiven her rebelliousness and becomes Princess Antonio. The captain dies not quite knowing what hit him.

Paris theatres wouldn't touch the play over its cross-dressing title character and thinly veiled homoeroticism. One producer told Péladan that only the mad King Ludwig II of Bavaria would mount it. Le Prince du Byzance never reached the stage but the author published the text in 1896.

For his lone setting of the play Satie chose Cavalcanti's speech from Act 2, Scene 9, where the captain seizes the Taranto flag ("Salut drapeau!") and exhorts the people to help Tonio overthrow Ferdinand. It is a key moment demanding fervor and spectacle from the music. Satie's piece, with the performance direction calme et doux (calm and soft), willfully ignores all the dramatic elements of Péladan’s text in favor of harmonic experiments previously explored in his Gymnopédies and Gnossiennes. The melody of the vocal line is based on the Greek chromatic genus, harmonized with major, minor and diminished chords within a structure of four-voiced chords in the same first-inversion form. "As a result", writes biographer Mary E. Davis, "the music has a consistent texture, with no hint of tonality or progress, and anticipates the aesthetic that Satie would later describe as stemming from boredom, which was 'mysterious and profound'".

Satie was probably unaware of the difficulties in presenting Le Prince du Byzance and soon moved on to his next project with Péladan, Le Fils des étoiles (1892). This time the play would be produced and Satie would compose a wall-to-wall incidental score – most of which would go unused.

In 1895 Satie announced the upcoming publication of Salut drapeau! as a free-standing work, but if he went through with this plan a copy has yet to surface. Seven decades later Robert Caby unearthed the piece from Satie's manuscripts at the Bibliothèque nationale de France and edited it for publication under the title Hymne Pour Le "Salut Drapeau" (Salabert, 1968). Caby added bar lines and dynamic markings deliberately omitted by the composer. Performances have been scarce, reflecting its status (in the words of Grove Music Online) as "an abstruse, intricately conceived curiosity" in Satie's oeuvre.

== Lyrics ==
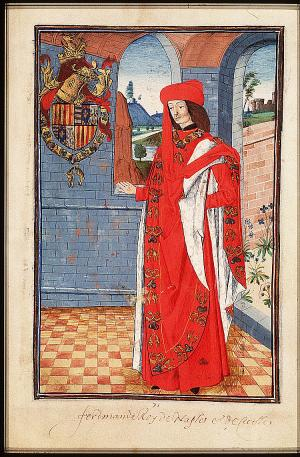
Ferdinand I of Naples, 1473 illuminated manuscript

Langes de tous les fils
Manteau de tous les pères
Suaire des héros
Étoffe teinte à la veine d'un peuple
Salut Drapeau!

Ta hampe est le grand mât de l'Argo national
Ta hampe est la colonne où un peuple s'appuye
Il est mort si tu penches, si tu tombes, avili
Salut Drapeau!

Voile gonglée par toutes les poitrines
Orgueilleux laborum
Ailes déployées des foules palpitantes
Tu portes dans ton vol le destin d'une race!
Symbole généreux
Idéal collectif
Salut Drapeau!

== Recordings ==
Meriel Dickinson, Peter Dickinson (Unicorn, 1975), Marjanne Kweksilber, Reinbert de Leeuw (Harlekijn, 1976), Nicolai Gedda, Aldo Ciccolini (EMI, 1987), Yumi Nara, Jill Cohen (Fontec, 1989), Jane Manning, Bojan Gorišek (Audiophile Classics, 1995), Anne-Sophie Schmidt, Jean-Pierre Armengaud (Mandala, 1996), Sabine Meyer (arrangement for clarinet), Marco Dalpane (Ants, 2007), Barbara Hannigan, Reinbert de Leeuw (Winter & Winter, 2016), Holger Falk, Steffen Schleiermacher (MDG, 2016).
