= Petite Ouverture à danser =

Composition by Erik Satie

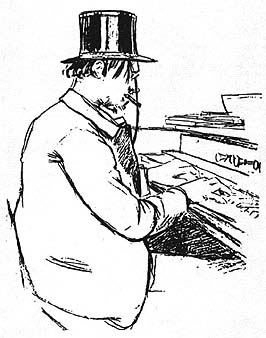
Portrait of Erik Satie in the 1890s

The Petite Ouverture à danser (Little Overture to a Dance) is a piece for solo piano composed around 1897 by Erik Satie. Unknown for many years, it is one of the more popular works to emerge from his posthumous manuscripts. A performance lasts under 3 minutes.

== Description ==
The piece was one of many Satie left unpublished at his death in 1925, an untitled draft without bar lines, dynamic markings or phrasing. Musicologists usually date it to 1897 because the sketch is contemporaneous with those of Satie's Pièces froides, and very much in the early Gnossiennes style he was revisiting at that time. Beginning and ending with an ethereal A flat major melody, the overture passes calmly through various seemingly unrelated keys; a subtle momentum is maintained with offbeat chords in the inner voices. There is harmonic ambiguity but no dissonance or drama to mar the placid musical atmosphere. Pianist Nicolas Horvath noted that "apart from two changes of metre, it would make a rather haunting slow dance, though not much of an overture".

In the late 1960s Robert Caby edited several collections of Satie's unpublished manuscripts from the Bibliothèque nationale de France, for issue by Salabert. These included the first commercial edition (1969) of the notorious Vexations, but the bulk were sketches, drafts, and exercises the composer had reasonable cause to withhold. Critics have questioned the necessity for these volumes as well as Caby's editorial decisions, which included giving unnamed pieces romantic-sounding titles Satie would have hated. Nevertheless a few minor gems emerged from the odds and sods. Caby saw enough potential in the Petite Ouverture à danser (his title) to have Salabert publish it as a stand-alone work in 1968. It has since had a respectable number of recordings, being particularly suited to albums of relaxation music.

== Recordings ==
Aldo Ciccolini (twice, for Angel in 1970 and EMI in 1987), Reinbert de Leeuw (Phillips, 1975), France Clidat (Forlane, 1980), Jean-Pierre Armengaud (Le Chant du Monde, 1986), Jean-Joël Barbier (Accord, 1987), Anne Queffélec (Virgin Classics, 1988), Johannes Cernota (Jaro, 1988), Yitkin Seow (Hyperion, 1989), Peter Lawson (EMI, 1989), Gabriel Tacchino (Disques Pierre Verany, 1993), Klára Körmendi (Naxos Records, 1994), Bojan Gorišek (Audiophile Classics, 1994), Ulrich Gumpert (ITM Media, 1995), Olof Höjer (Swedish Society Discofil, 1996), Pascal Rogé (Decca, 1997), Mari Tsuda (JVC, 1997), Perfecto Garcia Chornet (Arcobaleno, 1997), John White (Arte Nova, 1998), Patrick Cohen (Glossa, 2000), Jean-Yves Thibaudet (Decca, 2003), Steffen Schleiermacher (MDG, 2003), Alessandra Celletti (KHA, 2004), Håkon Austbø (Brilliant Classics, 2006), Cristina Ariagno (Brilliant Classics, 2006), Alexandre Tharaud (Harmonia Mundi, 2009), Michal Tal (Romeo Records, 2009), Christoph Deluze (Praga, 2013), Jeroen van Veen (Brilliant Classics, 2016), Marcel Worms (Zefir, 2016), Ludmilla Guilmault (Disques Triton, 2016), Antoinette van Zabner (Gramola, 2017), Nicolas Horvath (Grand Piano, 2019).
