= Véritables Préludes flasques (pour un chien) =

1912 composition for piano by Erik Satie

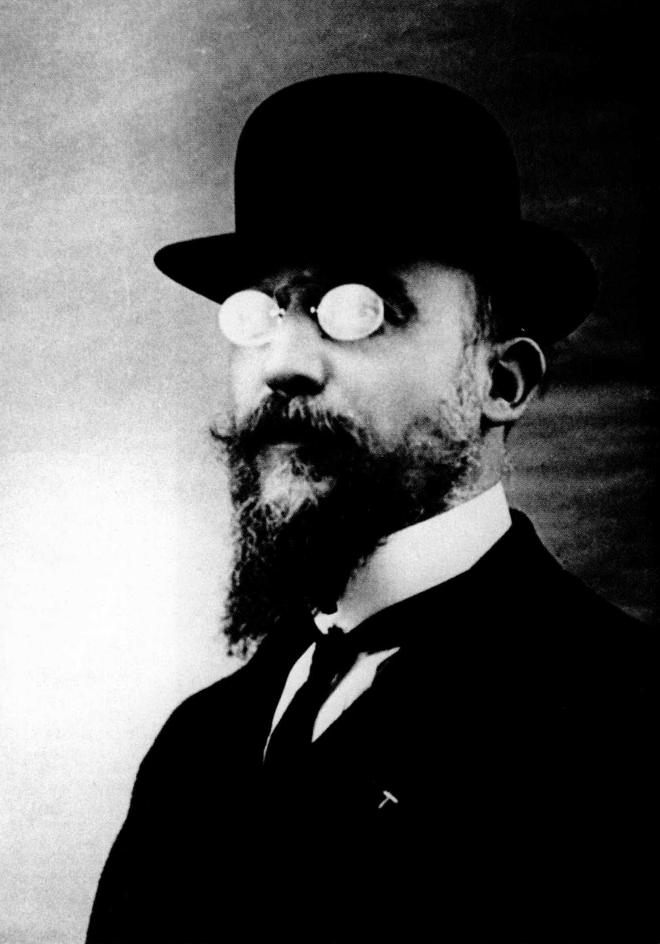
Erik Satie

The Véritables Préludes flasques (pour un chien) (True Flabby Preludes for a Dog) is a 1912 piano composition by Erik Satie. The first of his published humoristic piano suites of the 1910s, it signified a breakthrough in his creative development and in the public perception of his music. In performance it lasts about 5 minutes.

Satie's English biographer Rollo H. Myers, writing in 1948, remarked on the prophetic nature of this seemingly unassuming keyboard suite: "In the heyday of Impressionism...came the Flabby Preludes which in their linear austerity heralded the Neoclassic vogue which was to dominate Western music during the nineteen-twenties."

== Background ==
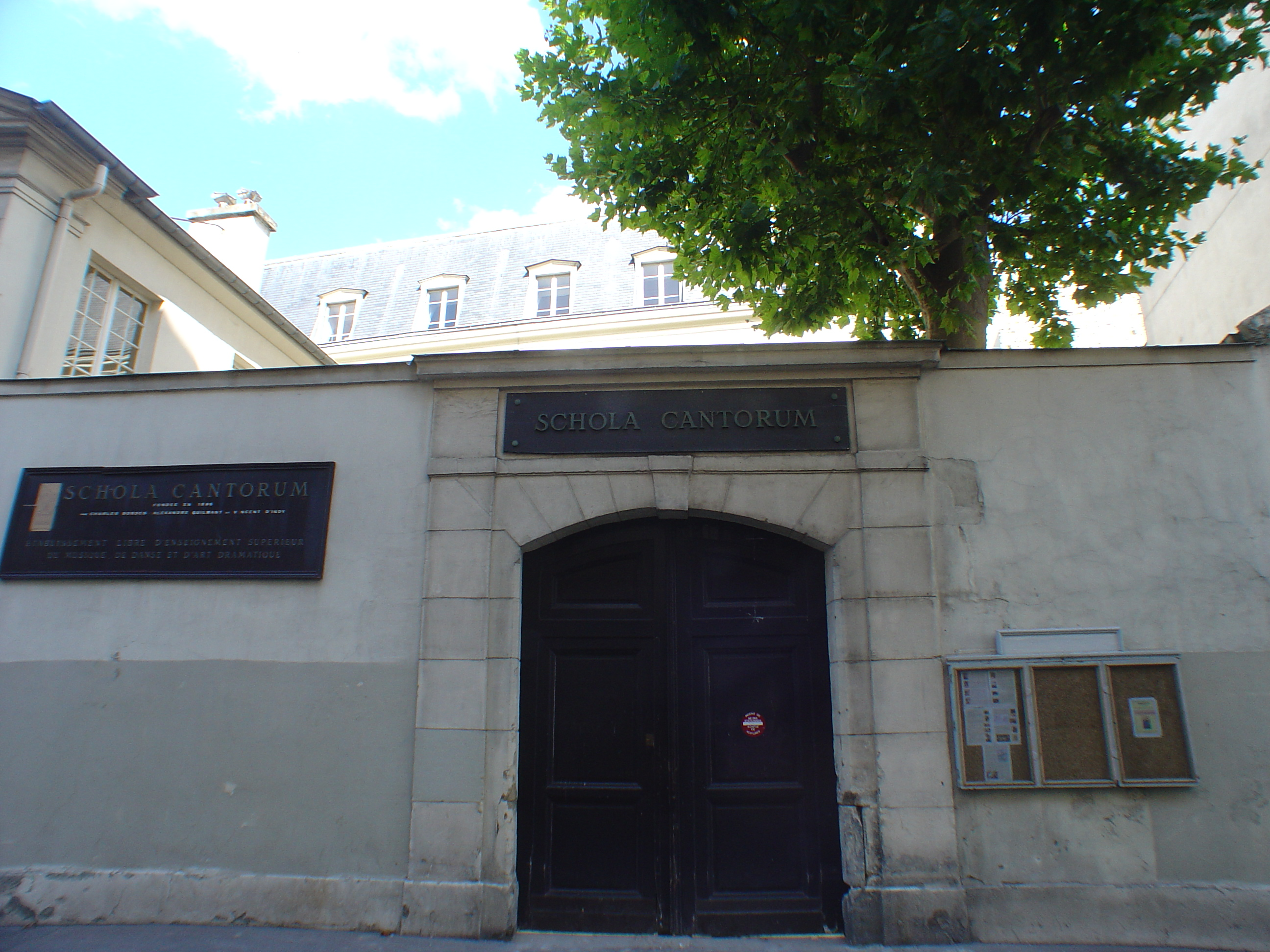
Schola Cantorum in Paris

The Véritables Préludes flasques (pour un chien) represents Satie's determination to reconcile his belated education at the Schola Cantorum in Paris under Vincent d'Indy (1905–12) with his own natural sense of wit and fantasy. It was in fact his second attempt at creating a composition on a canine theme, an idea that had long obsessed him.

In July 1912, Satie composed his piano suite Préludes flasques (pour un chien), but after it was rejected for publication by the Durand firm he informed his protégé Alexis Roland-Manuel that he was going to rewrite it from scratch. The three pieces of the new set were completed between August 12 and August 23, 1912. On September 13, Satie offered it to publisher E. Demets, who not only bought the work on the spot (for 50 francs) but asked for more. This modest triumph convinced Satie that he was on the right creative path at last. On November 23, 1912, he formally ended his studies with d'Indy. As Robert Orledge noted, "Once Satie could laugh at the Schola and himself he was back on course." The Véritables Préludes flasques were published the following month. Unlike Durand, Demets saw commercial potential in the amusing novelty of the Préludes. The firm would publish 10 of Satie's humoristic piano suites over the next four years.

== Music and texts ==
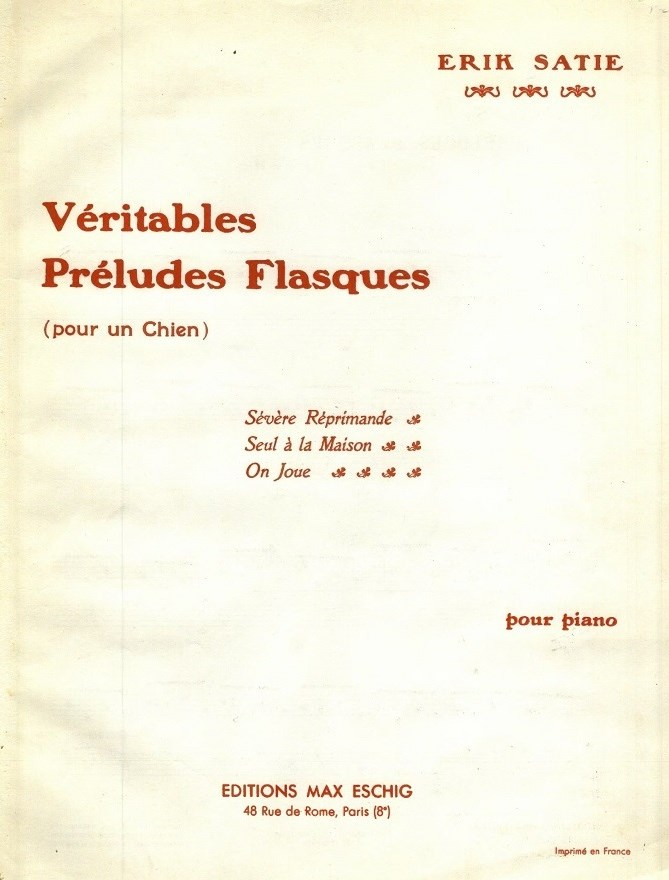
Cover of the original edition (1912) of the Véritables Préludes flasques (pour un chien)

Despite Satie's description of them as "flabby", the three Véritables Préludes flasques (pour un chien) are lean, dry, and starkly contrapuntal:

1. Sévère réprimande (Severe Reprimand)
2. Seul à la maison (Home Alone)
3. On joue (We Play)

Composer Charles Koechlin observed that here Satie "gets rid of repetitions and redundancies. He prunes, throws out ballast, suppresses held notes, condenses, reduces the musical dialogue to a strict minimum."

Biographer Pierre-Daniel Templier noted that "The novelty of the flabby preludes came as a charming surprise. Yet Satie's imagination is still kept in check here. Sévère réprimande, a lively and emphatic toccata with singing bass chords; Seul à la maison, a delightful two-part invention; On joue, with lightly bouncing fourths and fifths and minor sevenths climbing menacingly up the keyboard: no trace of humor here, in the music. But the directions are in mock Latin..." These Latin directions include corpulentus (fat), epotus (drunken), caeremoniosus (ceremonially), paululum (tiny), opacus (shady) and, in a possible dig at d'Indy, paedagogus (schoolmaster).

== Performance ==
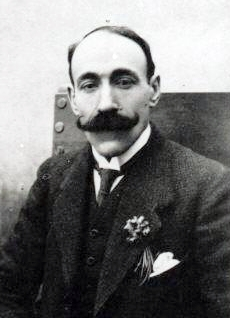
Ricardo Viñes in 1919

Satie dedicated the Véritables Préludes flasques (pour un chien) to pianist Ricardo Viñes, who gave the successful premiere of the work at a concert of the Société Nationale de Musique at the Salle Pleyel in Paris on April 5, 1913. Viñes would become the foremost champion of Satie's keyboard music through the early 1920s, premiering several of his compositions. Satie was delighted by the "irresistibly droll air of secrecy" of his interpretations. Viñes was also the piano teacher of Francis Poulenc, an important Satie protégé and future member of Les Six.

== Recordings ==
Aldo Ciccolini (twice, in 1968 for Angel Records and 1988 for EMI); Frank Glazer (Vox, 1968, reissued 1990); Jean-Joël Barbier (Universal Classics France, 1971); William Masselos (RCA, 1968); Grant Johannesen (Vox, 1976); Yūji Takahashi (Denon, 1979); France Clidat (Forlane, 1984); Johannes Cernota (PolJazz, 1984); Roland Pöntinen (BIS, 1986); Jan Kaspersen (Olufsen Records, 1987); Anne Queffélec (Virgin Classics, 1988); Peter Dickinson (Classical Collection, 1990, reissued by Olympia, 2001); Joanna MacGregor (Collins Records, 1992); Gabriel Tacchino (Disques Pierre Verany, 1993); Jean-Pierre Armengaud (Circé, 1990, reissued 2000); Michel Legrand (Erato Records, 1993); Klára Körmendi (Naxos, 1993); Bojan Gorišek (Audiophile Classics, 1994); Olof Höjer (Swedish Society Discofil, 1996); Jean-Yves Thibaudet (Decca, 2003); Steffen Schleiermacher (MDG, 2005); Cristina Ariagno (Brilliant Classics, 2006); Alexandre Tharaud (Harmonia Mundi, 2009); Katia and Marielle Labèque (KML, 2009), Jeroen van Veen (Brilliant Classics, 2016).
