= Préludes flasques (pour un chien) =

1912 set of four piano pieces by Erik Satie

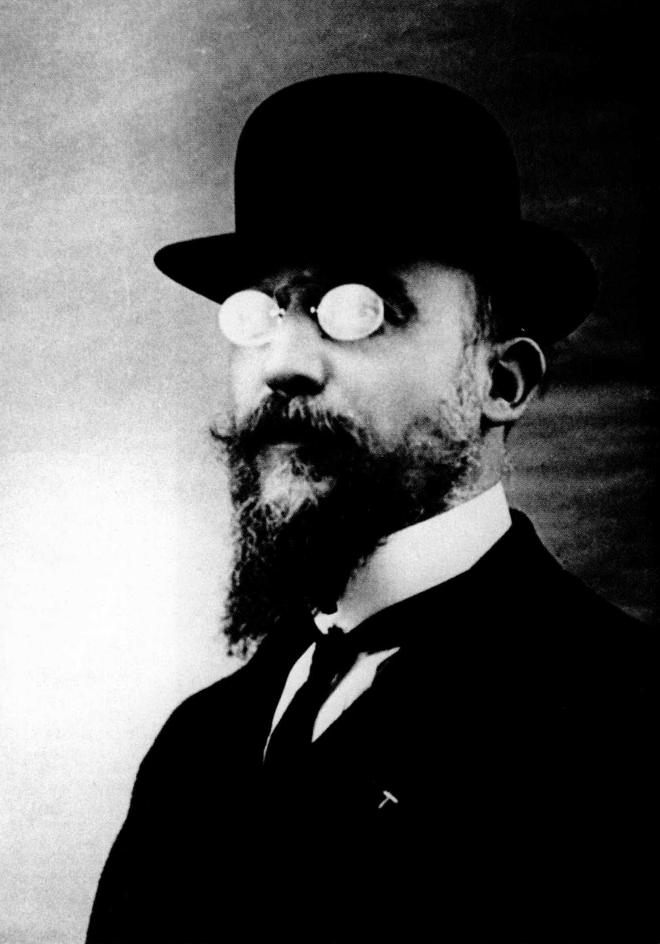
Erik Satie

The Préludes flasques (pour un chien) – Flabby Preludes (For a Dog) – is a set of four piano pieces composed in July 1912 by Erik Satie. In performance it lasts about 5 minutes.

The work demonstrates Satie's attempts to reconcile the linear contrapuntal style he had acquired through his recent studies at the Schola Cantorum in Paris with his natural sense of wit and fantasy. It was to have been the first of his series of humoristic piano suites (1912-1915), but the composer withdrew the score after it was rejected for publication. He then wrote a second set of pieces on the same theme, the Véritables Preludes flasques (pour un chien) (1912), which proved a breakthrough in Satie's career and creative development. The original Préludes flasques were presumed lost for decades and would not see print until 1967.

== History ==
Satie was never a pet-owner, but his fondness for dogs is well known. Stray mongrels he occasionally fed and sheltered were the only visitors he allowed inside his one-room Arcueil apartment during the 27 years he lived there. And among the random jottings in his composition notebooks can be found Blaise Pascal's famous quote, "The more I see of Mankind, the more I prefer my dog." As early as 1907 he considered calling the second movement of his Nouvelles pièces froides a Suite pour un chien ("Suite for a Dog").

Independent Satie scholar Ornella Volta believed the composer was inspired to dedicate a piece of music to a canine by one of his favorite books, Gargantua and Pantagruel by François Rabelais. In the preface to Gargantua, Rabelais paraphrased the ancient philosopher Socrates to urge readers to look beyond the "curious" titles of written works and explore their contents, just as a dog chews an unappetizing-looking bone to extract the marrow. The idea stayed with Satie long after he had completed his sets of preludes pour un chien. He would later tell author Jean Cocteau, "I want to write a play for dogs, and I already have my set design: the curtain rises on a bone."

The first three of the Préludes flasques (pour un chien) were completed in Paris between July 11 and July 23, 1912; the fourth was finished by the end of the month. Satie informed his friend Claude Debussy he was going to name the concluding piece Sous la futaille ("Bottom of the Barrel"), a title Debussy found so offensive that Satie changed it to Avec camaraderie ("With Friendship"). He may already have been dissatisfied with the work as it stood. After the publisher Durand rejected the score in the first week of August, Satie told his protégé Alexis Roland-Manuel, "I am going to destroy the Préludes flasques, and begin anew." He followed through on the second part of this statement with the Véritables préludes flasques (pour un chien), which he completed by August 23 and successfully sold to Demets in September.

In his 1948 biography of Satie, Rollo H. Myers cited Roland-Manuel when he wrote, "It is perhaps not generally known that Satie destroyed the original version of the Préludes flasques...and re-wrote them under the title, which they now bear, of Véritables préludes flasques." In reality Satie was not inclined to dispose of his manuscripts, regardless of what he told Roland-Manuel, and a wealth of unpublished material was retrieved from his squalid flat after his death. Robert Caby discovered the autograph of the Préludes flasques among the composer's papers at the Bibliothèque nationale de France, and edited it for publication by Max Eschig in 1967. The first recording was by pianist Aldo Ciccolini in 1968 (Angel Records).

== Music ==
The Préludes flasques consist of four pieces:

1. Voix d'intérieur (Voices Within)
2. Idylle cynique (Cynical Idyll)
3. Chanson canine (Canine Song)
4. Avec camaraderie (With Camaraderie)

There is nothing "flabby" about these preludes, which are lean, dry, and sharply contrapuntal. The harmonies are occasionally bitonal. They were written with conventional bar lines and time signatures, though Satie might have removed them at the proof stage (as he would in his later piano music) had they been accepted for publication. The first two pieces are pensive in mood. Stomping dissonances invade and finish off the lively Chanson canine; a whiff of the music hall can be detected in Avec camaraderie, with its dancelike rhythms and popular-sounding main theme. Apart from some of the titles there are no overt attempts at humor.

The primary difference between this abandoned set and the subsequent humoristic piano suites is its four-part structure. Beginning with the Véritables préludes flasques Satie would revert to his old "trinitarian obsession" (evident from such early works as the Sarabandes and Gymnopédies) and construct his piano music in groups of three.

== Other posthumous Préludes ==
Satie's 1912 notebooks pertaining to the Préludes flasques yielded four additional preludes, two of them grouped under the title Deux Préludes pour un chien. Robert Caby edited No. 2 of the latter set and published it as Prélude canin, No. 4 of his posthumous Satie collection Six Pièces de la période 1906-1913 (Salabert, 1968). The two unnamed preludes were also edited by Caby and published under his own title, Deux Rêveries nocturnes (Salabert, 1968).

== Recordings ==
Evelyne Crochet (Philips, 1968 - World First Recording)); Aldo Ciccolini (twice, in 1968 for Angel Records and 1988 for EMI); Jean-Joël Barbier (Universal Classics France, 1971); Grant Johannesen (Vox, 1976); Yūji Takahashi (Denon, 1979); France Clidat (Forlane, 1984); Jean-Pierre Armengaud (Circé, 1990, reissued 2000); Michel Legrand (Erato, 1993); Klára Körmendi (Naxos, 1993); Bojan Gorišek (Audiophile Classics, 1994); Olof Höjer (Swedish Society Discofil, 1996); Jean-Yves Thibaudet (Decca, 2003); Cristina Ariagno (Brilliant Classics, 2006) and Jeroen van Veen (Brilliant Classics 2016).
