= Sonnerie pour réveiller le bon gros Roi des Singes =

Composition by Eric Satie

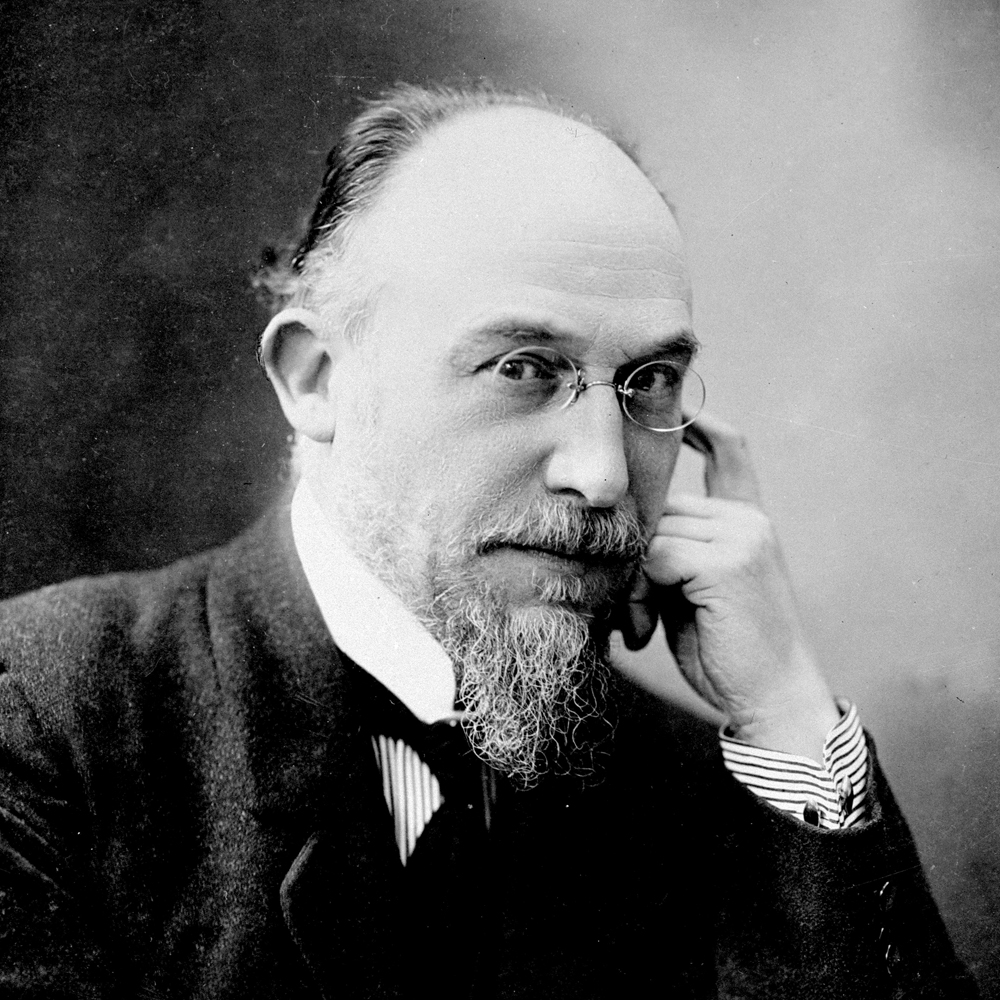
Erik Satie

Sonnerie pour réveiller le bon gros Roi des Singes (lequel ne dort toujours que d'un œil) (Fanfare for Waking Up the Big Fat King of the Monkeys [Who only Ever Sleeps with One Eye] ) is a fanfare for two trumpets in C composed in 1921 by Erik Satie. It was the last of his works to which he gave an outlandish title reminiscent of his "humoristic" vein. Eugene Goossens conducted the premiere at the Queen’s Hall in London on October 27, 1921. A performance lasts about a minute.

== Description ==
The Sonnerie was commissioned by the new British periodical Fanfare: A Musical Causerie, edited by musicologist Leigh Vaughan Henry (1889-1958). Although it ran for only seven biweekly numbers (October 1, 1921 - January 1, 1922), it covered a wide range of contemporary musical subjects, from indigenous African to Russian avant-garde. Best known was its namesake feature of publishing original fanfares by noteworthy composers in each issue; Manuel de Falla, Granville Bantock, Arnold Bax, Sergei Prokofiev, Havergal Brian, Arthur Bliss, and Francis Poulenc were among those who contributed.

Like his previous trumpet duet Marche de Cocagne (1919, later incorporated into the Trois petites pièces montées), Satie's Sonnerie is an example of pure Neoclassicism, though three times as long. Robert Orledge wrote of it as "a rare example of a Satie piece that survived in its original contrapuntal conception (including a canon at the third by inversion which is suddenly left high and dry in bar 8, followed by invertible counterpoint in bars 9-12). Satie had learned his craft at the Schola Cantorum well, but his natural sense of proportion and occasion told him to make his last four bars more straightforward and climactic, though sufficiently quirky in harmonic terms to identify him unmistakably as their author". He finished the piece in only two drafts before making a neat copy in his elegant calligraphy on August 30, 1921. This was published in facsimile in Fanfare's debut issue on October 1.

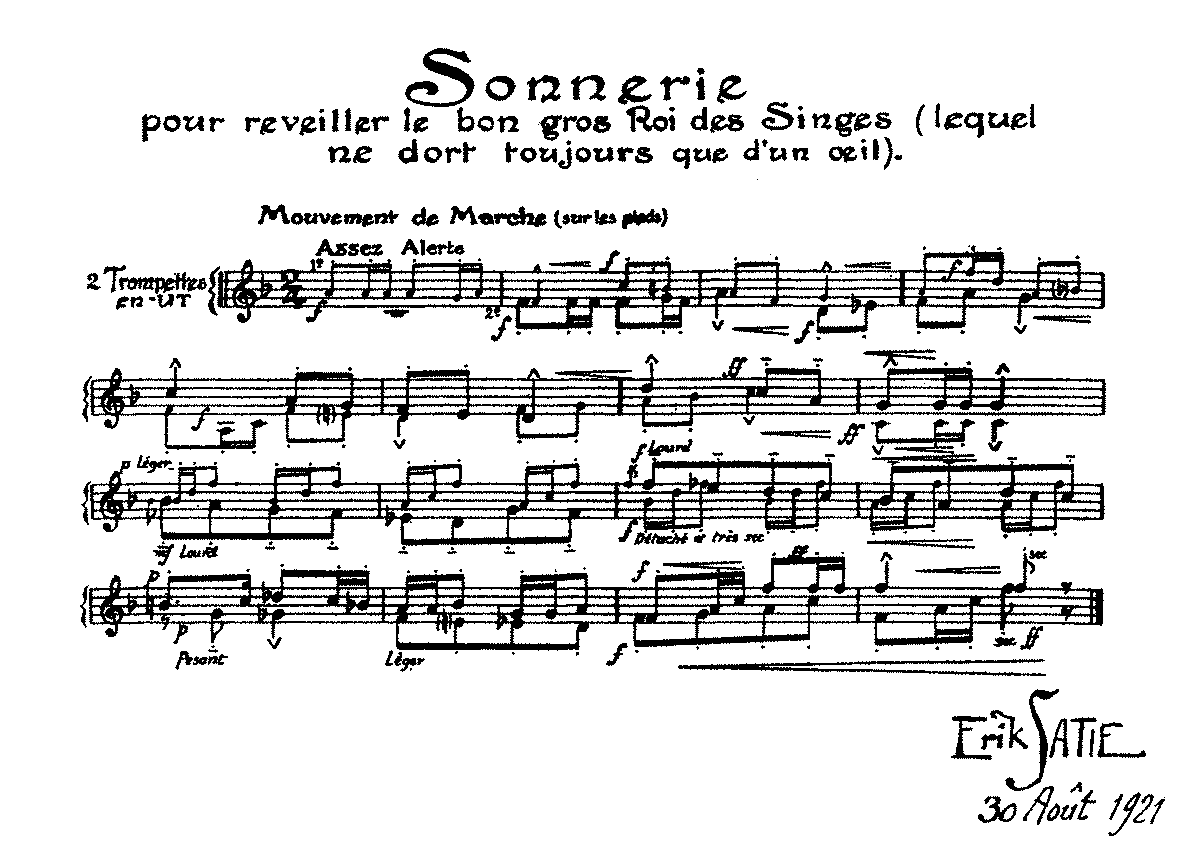
Facsimile of Satie's autograph manuscript

After World War I Satie was focused primarily on theatre music and saved his verbal wit for journalism. The disproportionately long title of Sonnerie pour réveiller le bon gros Roi des Singes (lequel ne dort toujours que d'un œil) may have been stirred by a recent blast from his humoristic past. On May 24, shortly before receiving the Fanfare invitation, Satie saw the belated premiere of his 1913 absurdist comedy Le piège de Méduse, in which the mechanical dancing monkey Jonas was the musical star of the show. The title also takes into account Satie's fascination with eyes, a recurring theme in his work dating back to the "Christian ballet" Uspud (1892). In his Mémoires d'un amnésique (Memoirs of an Amnesiac) the composer himself claimed he always slept with one eye open.

The first commercial score for the Sonnerie was published by Editions BIM in 1981.

== Recordings ==
Bernard Jeannoutot and Pierre Thibaud (Erato, 1981), Stephane Gourvat and Frédéric Mellardi (Indesens, 2006), Dallas Trumpets (Crystal Records, 2008), David Ammer (both parts, Brassjar Records, 2011).
