= Choses vues à droite et à gauche (sans lunettes) =

1916 work for violin and piano by Satie

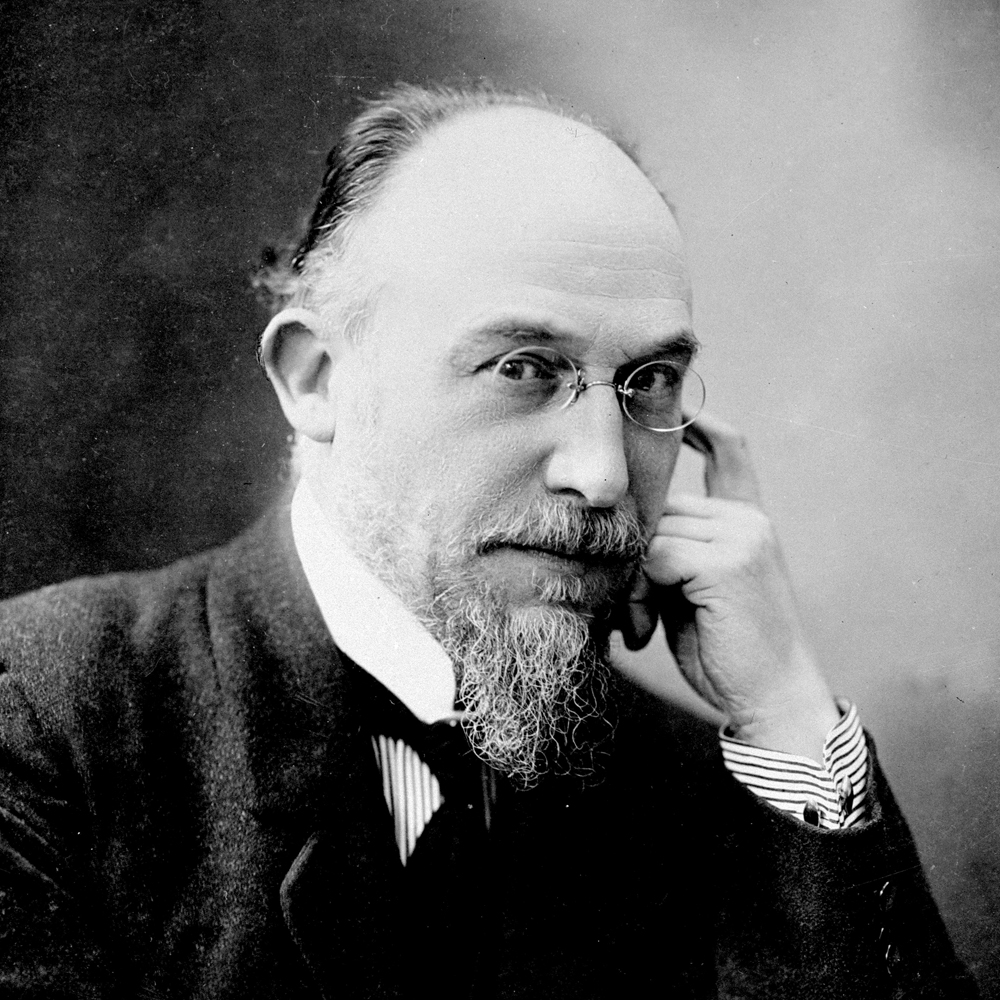
Erik Satie

Choses vues à droite et à gauche (sans lunettes), commonly translated as Things Seen Right-to-Left (Without Glasses), is a suite for violin and piano by Erik Satie. Composed in January 1914 and published in 1916, it is the only work he produced for violin-piano duet. A typical performance lasts about 5 minutes.

== Description ==
One of Satie's infrequent excursions into chamber music, the Choses vues is contemporaneous with the bulk of his humoristic piano suites (1913–14) and was conceived in a similar spirit. It has been interpreted as a spoof of academic musical training, in particular that of the Schola Cantorum in Paris, where the composer had recently ended his studies (at age 46) with Vincent d'Indy.

The suite's three brief pieces are satirical reinventions of Baroque musical forms, enhanced by Satie's characteristic droll titles and performance directions.

1. Choral hypocrite (Hypocritical Chorale) – G major – Grave
2. Fugue à tâtons (Groping Fugue) – C major – Pas vite
3. Fantaisie musculaire (Muscular Fantasy) – C major – Un peu vif

=== 1. Choral hypocrite ===
Satie had a singular attitude towards the chorale, that "symbol of Protestant piety and music pedagogy" much employed by Bach. In his own compositions he associated it with boredom and conformity. The 10-bar Choral hypocrite, played on muted strings, is built of stark self-contained phrases and hardly resembles the sort of singable "tune" one would expect from the genre. An almost painful dissonance at the halfway point (bars 5-6) is marked in the score "with the hand on the conscience." As a postscript Satie added a statement designed to annoy his critics: "My chorales equal those of Bach, with this difference: there are not so many of them, and they are less pretentious."

=== 2. Fugue à tâtons ===
A repetitive, childlike theme provides the subject for a loosely woven fugue, initiated by the piano "with silly but convenient naïveté." It wanders off on tangents that Satie's annotations suggest should evoke "tenderness and fatality" and "dry and distant bones." The score urges both players to tackle the theme's grandiloquent final restatement "with a big head."

=== 3. Fantaisie musculaire ===
This playfully ironic showpiece burlesques violin virtuosity but nevertheless requires considerable skill from the performer. It presents often dissonant send-ups of string techniques (harmonics, pizzicato, trill, glissando), culminating with a cadenza, which the player is advised to launch into "with enthusiasm" and end "very sheepishly and coldly." The suite fades out on an anticlimactic pianissimo.

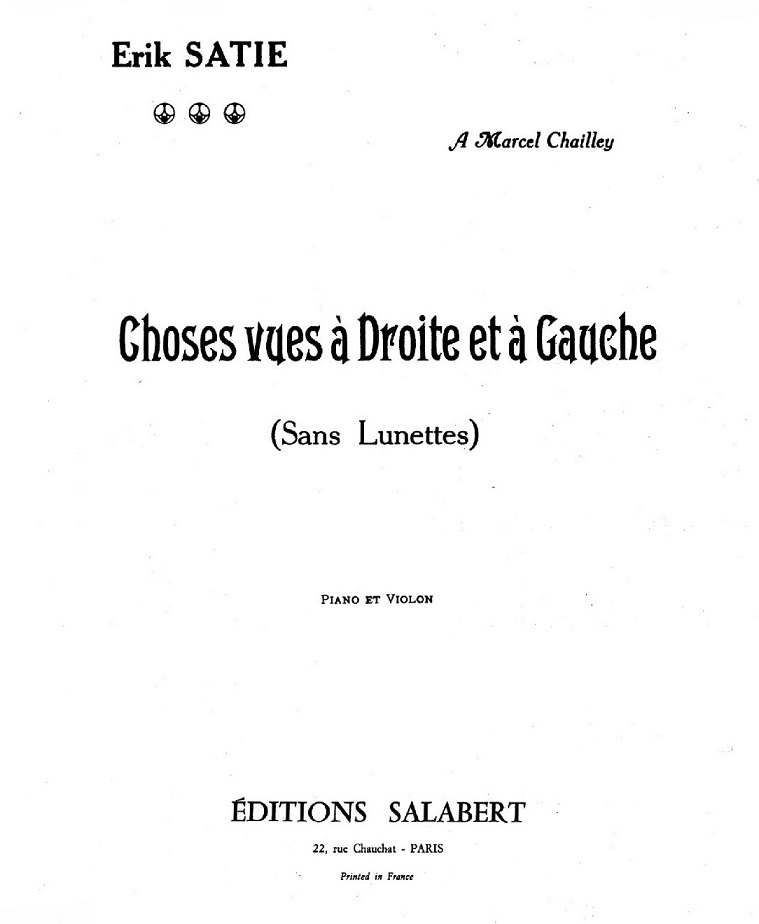
Title page of the first edition (1916) of Choses vues à droite et à gauche (sans lunettes)

Humor aside, Satie was painstaking in his efforts to redevelop these old musical forms in modern terms, harmonically and structurally. He rejected the first movement he completed, an untitled 31-bar chorale in G major, and experimented with several fugue subjects (including a quotation of the folksong Au clair de la lune) for the Fugue à tâtons. In his analysis of Satie's composing methods Robert Orledge remarked on "how ordinary his first thoughts often were", and this certainly applies to the Choses vues. Satie's original order for the pieces – Fantaisie, Choral, Fugue – would have given the suite a conventional fast-slow-fast pattern, with the cadenza appearing in the first movement in the manner of a traditional concerto, and the coda of the Fugue providing a conclusive-sounding finish. In the end Satie scrambled this sequence, and by positioning the Fantaisie as the finale saved most of the suite's musical jokes for last.

Performance of the Choses vues – along with the rest of Satie's 1914 compositions – was delayed by the start of World War I in July. Satie dedicated it to violinist Marcel Chailley (1881–1936), who with pianist Ricardo Viñes gave the premiere at the Ecole Lucien de Flagny in Paris on April 2, 1916. Rouart, Lerolle & Cie published the score later that year.

The unused chorale in G major was discovered by Robert Orledge and first performed by him with violinist Helen Sanderson at the University of Exeter on May 29, 1987. It was published under the title Autre choral in a new performing version of the Choses vues, edited by Orledge in 1995.

== Recordings ==
Notable recordings include those by violinist Yan Pascal Tortelier with pianist Aldo Ciccolini (Angel, 1971 and several EMI reissues), Millard Taylor with Frank Glazer (Candide, 1972, reissued by Vox 1994 and X5 Music Group 2008), Gidon Kremer with Elena Kremer (Philips, 1980), Keiko Mizuno with Yūji Takahashi (Denon, 1985), Tomaz Lorenz with Bojan Gorisek (Intermusic, 1995), Chantal Juillet with Pascal Rogé (Decca, 2000), and Isabelle Faust with Alexandre Tharaud (Harmonia Mundi, 2009, reissued 2014).
