= Noriko Ogawa (pianist) =

Japanese classical pianist (born 1962)

Noriko Ogawa (小川典子, Ogawa Noriko) (born 1962) is a Japanese classical pianist, based in London.

== Biography ==
Born in Kawasaki, Ogawa studied at the Tokyo College of Music (1977–1980) and the Juilliard School in New York (1981–1985), and later with Benjamin Kaplan.

=== Career ===
After coming in second in a Japanese music competition in 1984, Ogawa attained third prize in the 1987 Leeds International Piano Competition, which launched her international performing career. Her New York début came in 1982, and her London début in 1988.

Since 1997 Ogawa has been an exclusive recording artist for BIS Records. She has collaborated in a piano duo with British pianist Kathryn Stott since 2001, and the two women have recorded works by Delius for BIS Records. In 2003, they gave the first performance of Graham Fitkin's Circuit. She also has a longstanding collaboration with clarinetist Michael Collins.

Ogawa is noted for recording the piano concertos of Alexander Tcherepnin with conductor Lan Shui and the Singapore Symphony Orchestra.

Ogawa worked closely with Japanese composer Tōru Takemitsu, and appeared as an advocate for his music on the BBC World News classical music programme, Visionaries, in September 2008.

In 2011 she concluded a complete series of Debussy recordings and a new Mozart disc for BIS Records. Her Debussy discs have won the Editor's Choice of Gramophone Magazine, as well as Takemitsu recording.

Ogawa regularly commissions new works and has performed premieres of works by composers of contemporary classical music, such as Yoshihiro Kanno or Dai Fujikura.

Ogawa teaches at the Guildhall School of Music and Drama (Professor of Piano) in London, and at the Tokyo College of Music (visiting Professor) in Tokyo.

=== Humanitarian work ===
Ogawa has been involved in fundraising for relief and rebuilding efforts following the March 2011 Japanese earthquake.

She serves as a Cultural Ambassador for the National Autistic Society, performing concerts for the parents of autistic children. She calls this concert series "Jamie's concerts", after the severely autistic son of two musician friends with whom she lived in London and whom she supported as they learned to diagnose and then cope with the disorder, saying: "I am not a doctor, I'm not a nurse, I'm not a teacher for someone with special needs, but I am a musician. What I realised is that I can do something – I can play concerts that give people like Jamie's parents a break and an opportunity to meet other people who care for autistic children".
