= Frank Glazer =

American pianist, composer, and teacher

Frank Glazer (February 19, 1915 – January 13, 2015) was an American pianist, composer, and teacher of music.

== Career details ==
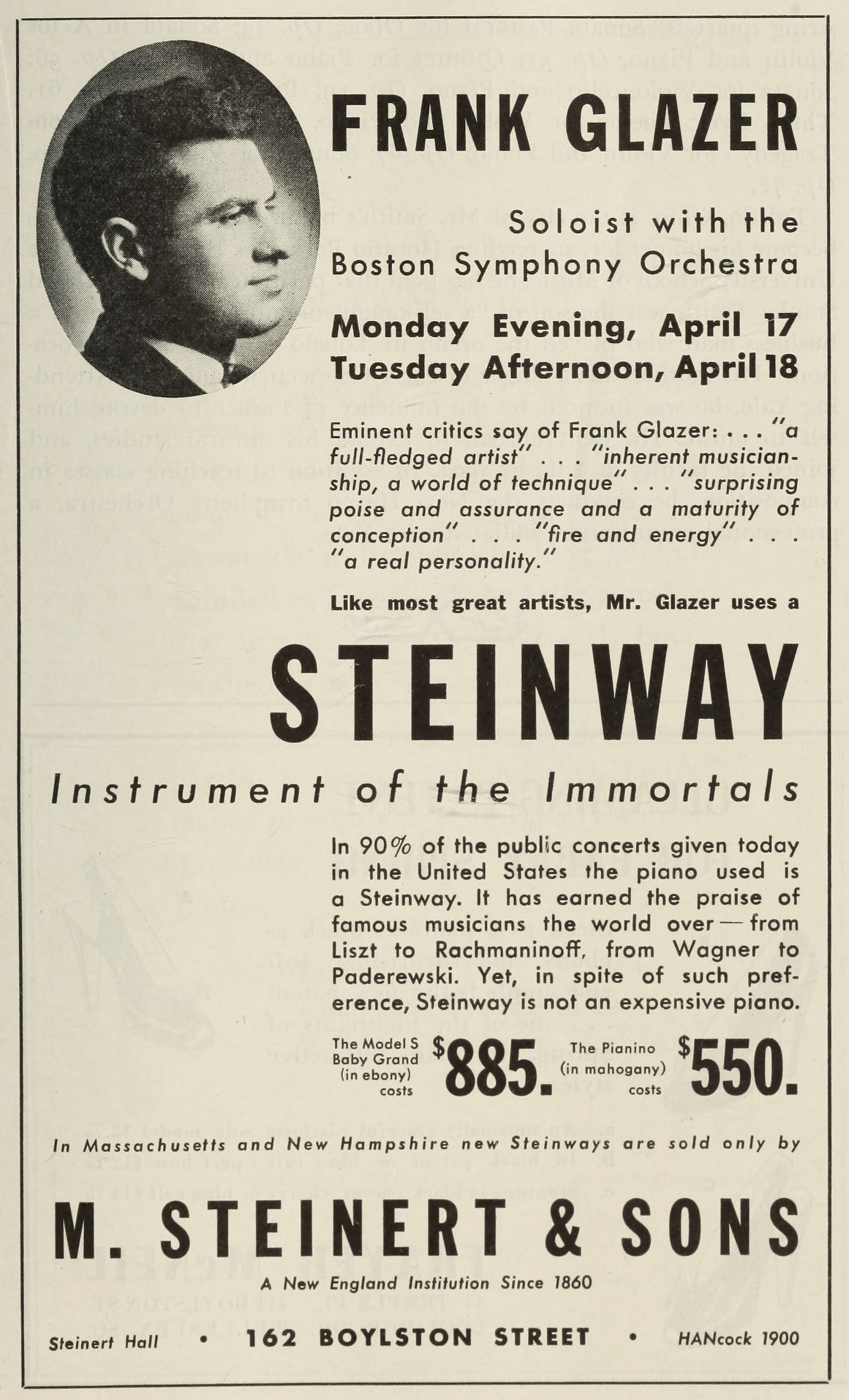
Glazer in an advertisement for Steinway pianos, from a Boston Symphony Orchestra program, April 1939

Glazer was born in Chester, Wisconsin on February 19, 1915, the sixth child of Benjamin and Clara Glazer, Jewish emigrants from Lithuania. The family moved to Milwaukee in 1919. His first piano lessons were given by his sister Blanche (1907–1920); later he was taught by several local musicians. Frank Glazer was educated in Milwaukee Public Schools, and graduated the city's North Division High School in 1932. In his teenage years, he played in his brothers' dance band, his high school band and vaudeville. Alfred Strelsin, a New York City signage manufacturer and arts patron, provided the funds for Glazer to travel to Berlin in 1932 to study with Artur Schnabel; he also studied with Arnold Schoenberg. Glazer then taught piano in Cambridge, Massachusetts.

Strelsin urged Glazer to make his New York debut, telling him, "If you don't start by the time you're 21, forget it". Glazer made his debut at Town Hall in New York City on October 20, 1936, with a program of Bach, Brahms, Schubert and Chopin. He played this program again in 2006, to celebrate his seventieth anniversary of public performance. In 1939 Glazer performed with the Boston Symphony Orchestra under Sergei Koussevitzky. Glazer served in the United States Army as an interpreter from 1943 to 1945 in Germany and France.

In the early 1950s, Glazer had his own television show called Playhouse 15 in Milwaukee. On September 6, 1952, he married classical singer Ruth Gevalt (1910–2006). (1) With his wife, Ruth, he founded in the 1970s the Saco River Festival in Maine, a summer chamber series. From 1965 until 1980 Glazer taught at the Eastman School of Music; among his students Myriam Avalos and Martin Amlin. In 1980 Glazer left Eastman and became artist in residence at Bates College in Maine.

Glazer has been called "the greatest interpreter of the piano music of Erik Satie". In the 1960s he recorded the complete piano music of Satie for the Vox label.

Glazer died at the age of 99 on January 13, 2015. His brother David was a clarinetist who performed with the New York Woodwind Quintet for more than 35 years.

== Notes ==
(1) The Fountain of Youth: The Artistry of Frank Glazer, by Duncan J Cumming (VDM Verlag, Saarbrücken, Germany, 2009).
