= Jean-Pierre Armengaud =

French academic

Jean-Pierre Armengaud (born 17 June 1943) is a French music educator, musicologist, researcher and pianist.

== Career ==
Armengaud was born in Clermont-Ferrand. From 1967 to 1974, he seconded Germaine Arbeau-Bonnefoy in the presentation of the Musigrains, pedagogical cycles of concerts-lectures given at the Théâtre des Champs-Élysées.

Armengaud is the author of several publications about Erik Satie, Jean Dubuffet, Henri Dutilleux, Edison Denisov, as well as numerous articles on French music, Russian music, musical creation, pianistic interpretation, and some thirty or so discographic publications (integrals of Satie, Debussy, Poulenc, Roussel).

Armengaud is director of the University of Évry festival "Les Friches musicales".

== Publications ==
- "Comment interpréter Aliénor d'Aquitaine" in Revue 303, June 2004
- Study "Pour un nouveau Projet Culturel et Patrimonial de L'Abbaye Royale de Fontevraud; éléments pour un contrat d'objectif", September 2004, 35 pages
- Publication of a communication on Critique et Interprétation d'Erik Satie in Cahiers du séminaire inter-arts Paris1-Paris 4, directed by par Marc Jimenez, 2005
- Preparation of proceedings of the symposium on pianistic interpretation, published in an issue of the Cahiers d'esthétique (Université de Paris 1) March 2008
- Co-organization of a symposium on Robert Schumann Nouveaux regards, Nouvelles écoutes at the University of Évry, 7 and 8 December 2006; realisation of a communication on Schumann à travers l'autobiographie inédite de Jean-Bonaventure Laurens, with an unpublished portrait of Robert Schumann
- Publication of a text and a double CD devoted to the piano work of Albert Roussel, including the analysis and execution of six unpublished works, Mandala-Harmonia Mundi, November 2006
- Publication of an article on "L'œuvre d'Henri Dutilleux" in La Revue d'Histoire de la Touraine, March 2007, translated into Italian for the magazine Finnegans, (Lombardy), published in November 2007
- Masterclass for concertists and musicologists at Goldsmiths, University of London, Warsaw Academy of Music, Trieste and Rovigo conservatories, Beijin Central Conservatory, The Academy of Music of Tirana
- Numerous conferences/concerts for Universities of the Third Age
- Erik Satie. Paris: Éditions Fayard. 2009. ISBN 9782213602523.

== Recordings (selection) ==
- Quintet version of La création du monde by Darius Milhaud
- Fantasy for violin and piano and Quatuor pour la fin du temps by Olivier Messiaen
- CD of unedited transcriptions by Maurice Ravel
- CD-book of late works for piano by Robert Schumann, written at the time of the meeting with Jean-Joseph Bonaventure Laurens
