= Le Bœuf Angora =

Composition by Erik Satie

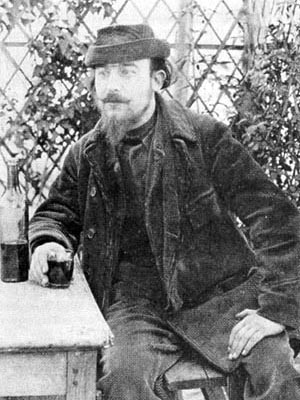
Erik Satie

Le Bœuf Angora (The Angora Ox) is an unfinished tone poem composed around 1901 by Erik Satie. Based on a tale by Lord Cheminot (alias J. P. Contamine de Latour), it was his first attempt at writing for large orchestra. The original score has never been published, though Satie reused a portion of it as the Redite movement of his Trois morceaux en forme de poire (1903). Today the existing work can be heard in a reconstruction for solo piano. In performance it lasts about 8 minutes.

== Description ==
Le Bœuf Angora was one of several Satie-Contamine de Latour projects that never progressed beyond paper at the turn of the 20th century. Musicologists believe it was created after their joint effort Le poisson rêveur (The Dreamy Fish, March 1901) and the two are thought of as companion pieces. Contamine de Latour's text does not survive but judging from his contemporaneous work it was an essay in anthropomorphic satire, such as his play La Mort de Monsieur Mouche (1900), for which Satie produced a ragtime-inspired Prelude. A spirit of irreverent experimentation seems to have guided Satie's approach to the subject. Only he would have considered composing a French symphonic poem about an ox.

The music, marked Pas trop vite, is divided into two distinct parts played without pause. The first opens in D major with a plodding step reminiscent (perhaps ironically) of Bydlo from Mussorgsky's Pictures at an Exhibition. Tentative breaks in the rhythm (such as the trill in bar 7) suggest little incidents but without drama; the dynamics seldom rise to forte, and the crescendo to ff in bars 57–60 is coaxed in poco a poco. At bar 67 an abrupt change in tone heralds the shorter second part, which shifts to F major and from common to triple time. A confident five-note theme (repeated twice) acts as a unifying refrain while being needled by quirky, seemingly mistrustful harmonies. A quiet coda returns us to the opening's D major. This is the section Satie later transcribed for piano four hands as the concluding piece in the Troix morceaux.

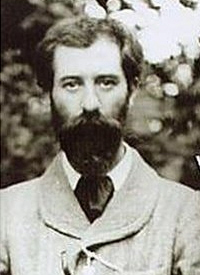
Charles Koechlin

Le Bœuf Angora is scored for piccolo, 2 flutes, 1 oboe, 1 cor anglais, 2 clarinets in A, 2 bassoons, 2 horns in F, 2 trumpets in C, 3 trombones, 1 tuba, percussion for 2 players (including timpani), and strings. Satie was still unschooled in orchestration and he struggled with this ambitious score. At one point he sought advice from another composer, his friend Charles Koechlin, whose handwritten corrections and instrumental influences can be found in the last pages of the manuscript. He ultimately abandoned the project, leaving a heavily amended nine-page sketch and two additional pages of short score. This failure left Satie ever more touchy and secretive about his composing methods, feelings that would only worsen with age. When Edgard Varèse claimed he "helped" with the orchestration of Cinq grimaces pour Le songe d'une nuit d'été in 1915, Satie permanently withdrew the suite. After his death the Le Bœuf Angora manuscripts were held by his music executor Darius Milhaud and since 1940 have resided in the archives of the Bibliothèque nationale de France.

Luxembourgian composer Johny Fritz reconstructed Le Bœuf Angora as a performing edition for solo piano, based on the original autographs and Satie's Trois morceaux transcription. It was published (along with Le poisson rêveur) by Salabert in 1995.

== Exit ==
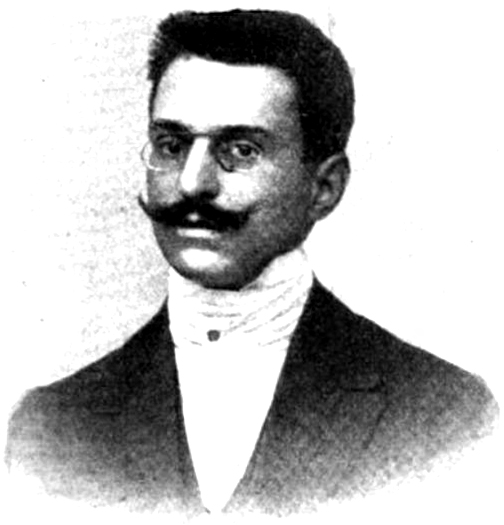
J. P. Contamine de Latour in 1901

Le Bœuf Angora is the final opus by Erik Satie and J. P. Contamine de Latour that can be dated with any certainty. Together they produced 10 works over two periods (1886–93, 1899–c.1901), with the author acting as Satie's lyricist (the Trois Mélodies of 1886), librettist (Uspud, Geneviève de Brabant), or muse (the Gymnopédies). It appears they were no longer in contact by August 1905, when Satie removed his name from two unpublished cabaret tunes (Impérial-Oxford, Légende californienne, dates unknown) and registered them with SACEM as "songs without lyrics". In his 1925 reminiscences Contamine de Latour glossed over the last years of their once close friendship, stating that from the late 1890s "circumstances came between us, and we saw each other more and more rarely", but nevertheless provided a warm eulogy. "I won't speak of Satie the composer – others who are expert in the field will take care of that", he wrote. "But I believe that Erik Satie was a very great artist who was understood only by an élite, and to whom the passage of time will do justice. I wanted to pay this affectionate tribute...to one who was the dear and intimate companion of my youth, and whose memory recalls so many hours of carefree happiness and glittering dreams that are no more".

== Recordings ==
Jean-Yves Thibaudet (Decca, 2002), Duanduan Hao (Naxos, 2018), Nicolas Horvath (Grand Piano, 2019), Steffen Schleiermacher (MDG, 2020).
