= Le Poisson rêveur =

Composition by Erik Satie

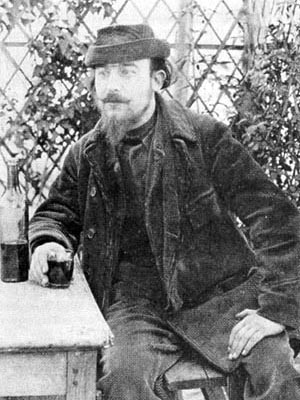
Erik Satie

Le Poisson rêveur (The Dreamy Fish) is an unfinished tone poem for solo piano composed between 1900 and 1901 by Erik Satie, based on a tale by "Lord Cheminot" (alias J. P. Contamine de Latour). The text does not survive and Satie's music went unpublished for decades. In performance the piece lasts about 6 minutes.

An experimental work, it is the only example of Satie trying his hand at the impressionist style of his friend Claude Debussy. Musicologist Robert Orledge observed, "The concept of Satie trying to imitate the revered Debussy is a touching one: it seems as if he was trying to compose Debussy out of his system..."

== Description ==
Le Poisson rêveur is one of two tone poems by Satie (with Le Bœuf Angora) set to lost stories by Contamine de Latour. No other work more painfully illustrates his struggle to find a new creative direction at the start of the 20th century. Composition began in early 1900, right after the completion of the ragtime-inspired Petit Prélude de 'La Mort de Monsieur Mouche', and dragged on intermittently for about a year; the manuscript is full of discarded drafts and scribbled-out passages. What was supposed to have been the neat copy is dated "March 1901" but even that is covered with corrections. Satie usually assigned dates only to his finished works, and his doing so here smacks more of surrender than accomplishment.

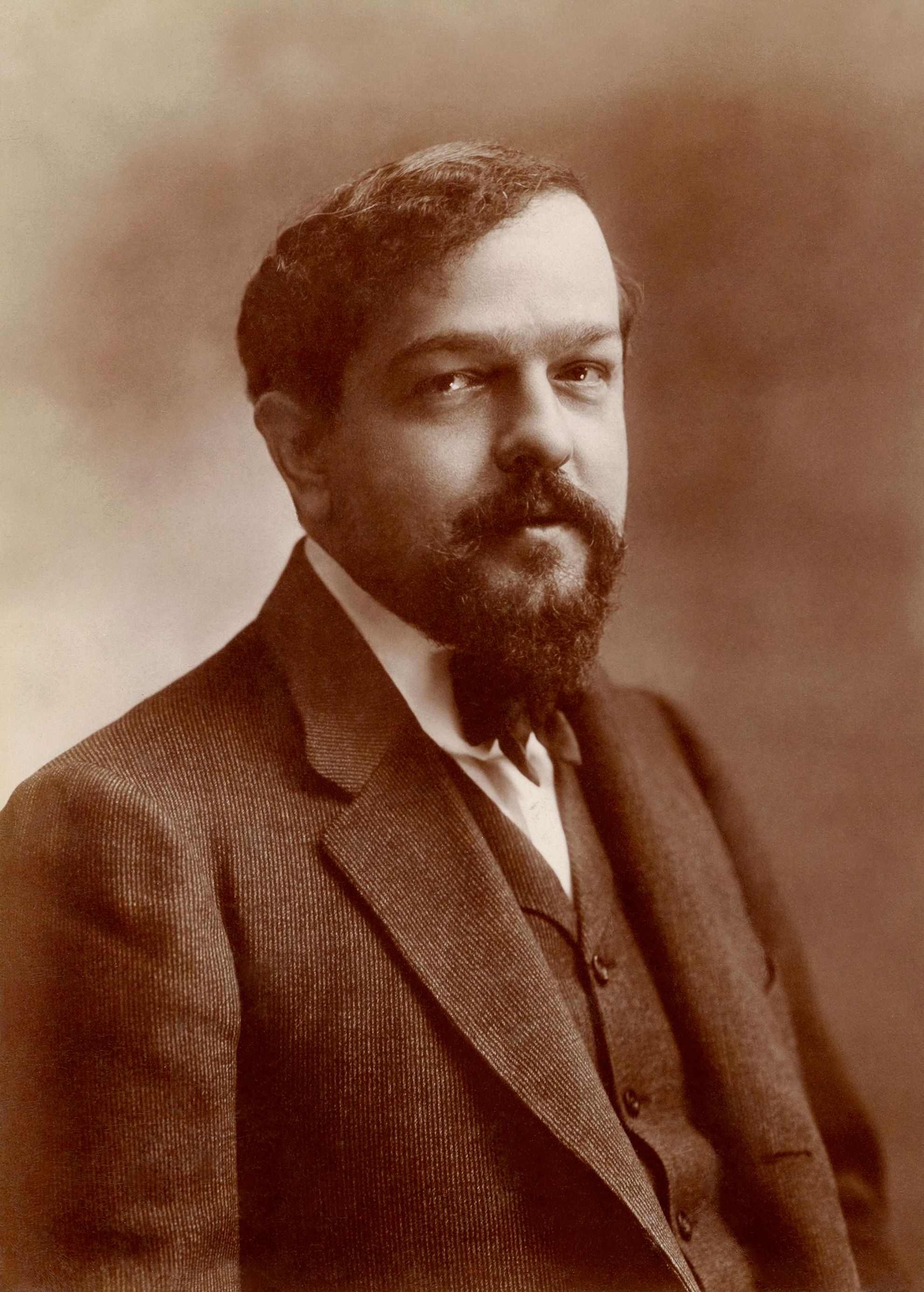
Claude Debussy

Satie's apparent goal for Le Poisson rêveur was to strike a balance between his "serious" and "popular" idioms in the course of one continuous symphonic movement, while trying to think harmonically along Debussyan lines. Instead of his trademark motivic juxtapositions, Satie attempted through-composition in extended passages; the keyboard writing is orchestral rather than pianistic, with occasional indications for other instruments in the score (oboe, clarinet, flutes, strings). The opening is an impetuous 7-note motif, which recurs four times and then closes the piece, but this bid for cyclic unity is all but swamped in an ongoing succession of heterogeneous material. Mosaic-like melodic fragments reminiscent of Satie's early music are followed by more conventional rounded phrases and jaunty dotted rhythms borrowed from Jack in the Box (1899). The melody of the central section is taken almost whole from the "Petit air de Geneviève", an aria from Satie's miniature opera Geneviève de Brabant (1900). It is tempting to read Satiean irony into this musical quote, with its original lyrics "Ah! Heaven rewards my virtue", but probably unwise without the context of the missing story. The Debussy influence is most prominent up to and after the recapitulation, with a brief development section very rare in Satie. In his analysis of the score, Orledge concluded that "in trying to achieve too much at once, Satie produced an unconvincing piece, especially in its control of tonality. For all its surface activity, [Le Poisson rêveur] is static, confused and more of an interesting experiment than a performable piece".

In retrospect, the jumble of styles and self-borrowing in Le Poisson rêveur make it seem like a test run for the similarly diffuse Trois Morceaux en forme de poire (1903), in which Satie handled the issue of form by dividing the material (rather facetiously) into a suite. By that time he was still hoping to interest Debussy in the earlier work. In a letter dated August 17, 1903, Satie mentioned he had started composing the Trois morceaux, and then dropped Debussy a little reminder: "And this blasted dreamy fish? Did you make it take your hook?" We don't know what Debussy thought of the piece but he remembered it: a lyrical theme first heard in bars 19–22 turns up in the similarly named Poissons d'or (Goldfish) from Debussy's Images for piano (Book II, 1907). This theme also strangely prefigures that of the popular British song "Run, Rabbit, Run" (1938).

Robert Caby edited the first performing edition of Le Poisson rêveur in 1970, making unacknowledged changes to the score. These were corrected in the edition by Robert Orledge, published by Salabert in 1995.

== Recordings ==
Aki Takahashi (Angel, 1979), Aldo Ciccolini (EMI, 1987), France Clidat (Forlane, 1980), Jean-Pierre Armengaud (Le Chant du Monde, 1986), Pascal Rogé (Decca, 1989), Klára Körmendi (Naxos Records, 1994), Bojan Gorišek (Audiophile Classics, 1994), Olof Höjer (Swedish Society Discofil, 1996), Jean-Yves Thibaudet (Decca, 2003), Håkon Austbø (Brilliant Classics, 2006), Cristina Ariagno (Brilliant Classics, 2007), Alexandre Tharaud (Harmonia Mundi, 2009), Jeroen van Veen (Brilliant Classics, 2016), Stephanie McCallum (ABC, 2016), Noriko Ogawa (BIS, 2016), Nicolas Horvath (Grand Piano, 2019), Steffen Schleiermacher (MDG 2019) .
