= Sarabandes (Satie) =

1887 composition for piano by Erik Satie

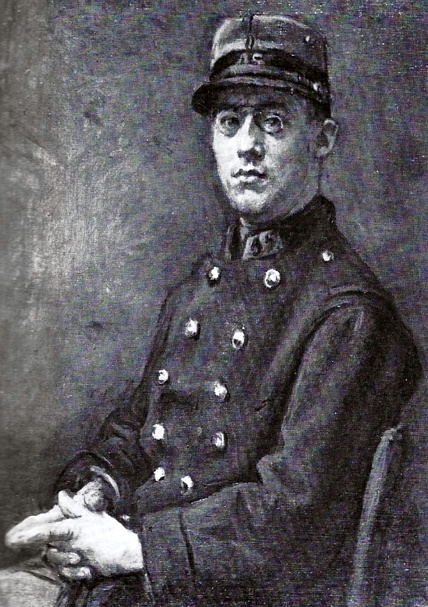
Erik Satie in army uniform, 1893 painting by Marcellin Desboutin

The Sarabandes are three dances for solo piano composed in 1887 by Erik Satie. Along with the famous Gymnopédies (1888) they are regarded as his first important works, and the ones upon which his reputation as a harmonic innovator and precursor of modern French music, beginning with Debussy, principally rests. The Sarabandes also played a key role in Satie's belated "discovery" by his country's musical establishment in the 1910s, setting the stage for what became his international fame.

French composer and critic Alexis Roland-Manuel wrote in 1916 that the Sarabandes represented "a milestone in the evolution of our music...pieces of an unprecedented harmonic technique, born of an entirely new aesthetic, which create a unique atmosphere, a sonorous magic of complete originality."

== Background ==
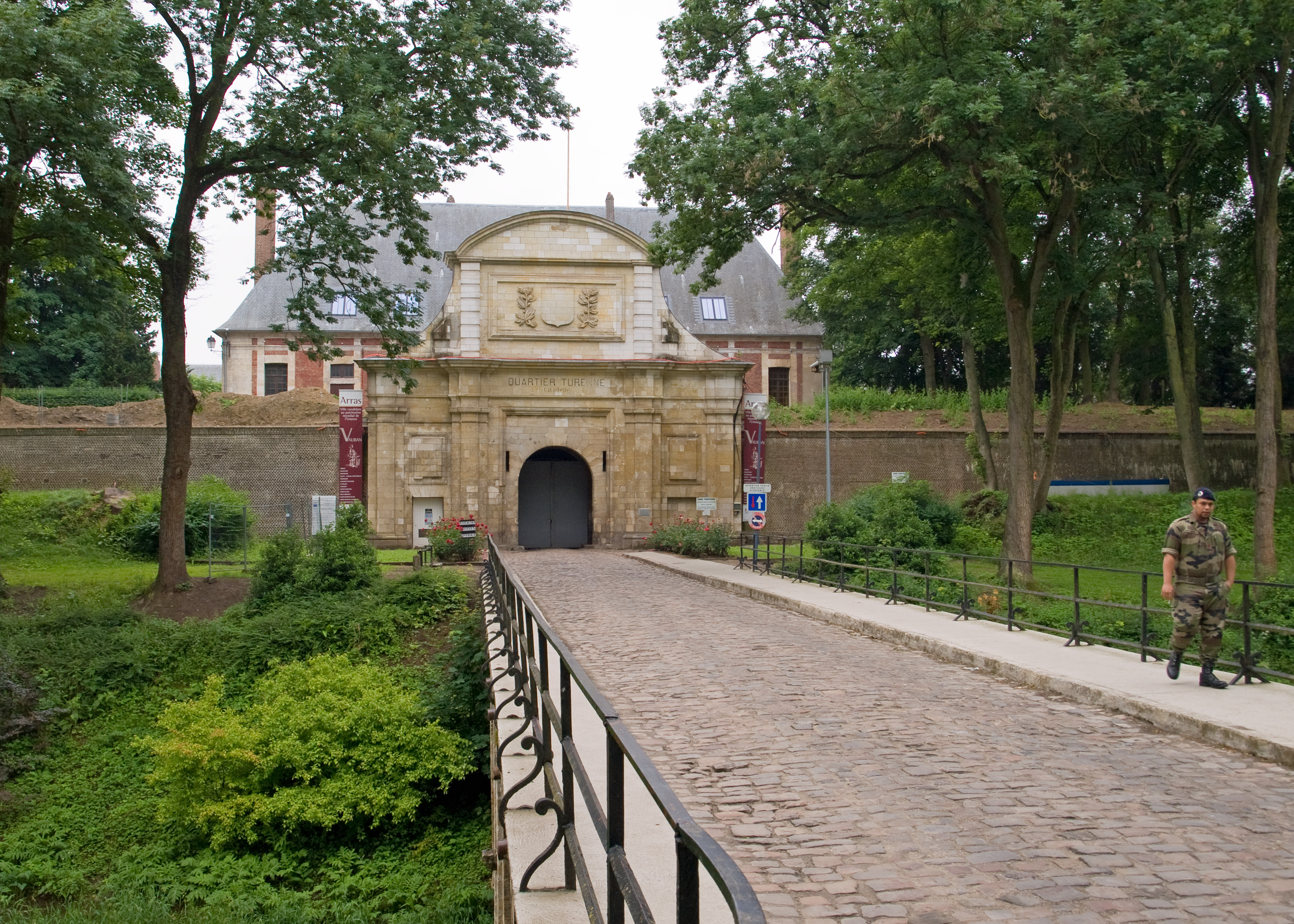
The Arras Citadel, where Satie was stationed during his military service

The Sarabandes emerged at a point in Satie's life when he was beginning to assert his independence as a man and artist. In November 1886, the 20-year-old composer dropped out of the Paris Conservatoire and enlisted in the French army. His close friend and collaborator at the time, the poet Contamine de Latour, claimed Satie had persisted with his hated Conservatory courses only so he could qualify for a student exemption that would reduce his five years' compulsory military service to one year in the reserves. Satie was duly assigned as a reservist to the 33rd Infantry Regiment at the Citadel in Arras, nicknamed La belle inutile ("The Useless Beauty") for its fine architecture and lack of strategic importance. But even this comparatively mild duty proved too onerous for his liking. He sought to make himself ill by sneaking out of his barracks at night and strolling about bare-chested in the winter air, with the result that he came down with a severe case of bronchitis. By April 1887 he was back at his family's home in Paris on a two-month medical leave.

During his convalescence Satie reunited with Latour, read Gustave Flaubert's Salammbô and The Temptation of Saint Anthony, and discovered the writings of Joséphin Péladan, the future founder of the Mystic Order of the Rose + Cross with which Satie would be associated in the early 1890s. In May he was thrilled by a performance of Emmanuel Chabrier's new opera Le roi malgré lui, with its daring use of unresolved seventh and ninth chords. As a tribute he visited the composer's home and left with the concierge a copy of one of his early scores, with an extravagant dedication inscribed in red ink. Chabrier never responded to Satie's gesture.

On subsequent leaves from his regiment Satie began sketching two compositions, the Sarabandes and the Gymnopédies. He finally focused his attention on the Sarabandes and finished them on September 18. It was the last music he composed under his father's roof. In November 1887 he was discharged from the army, and the following month - with a gift of 1600 francs from his father to get him started - he set out on his own for a new life in Montmartre, the Bohemian center of Paris.

== Music ==
The sarabande is a dance in triple meter that originated in the Spanish colonies of Central America in the mid-1500s. It had migrated to Europe by the 17th century, where in France it became a popular slow court dance. Satie's modern reinterpretations consist of three dances with a total duration of roughly 15 minutes:

- No. 1 in A♭ major
- No. 2 in D♯ minor
- No. 3 in B♭ minor

Biographer Mary E. Davis wrote that "the Sarabandes introduce compositional approaches that would prove important not only in Satie's later work but also in the broader history of French music...they presented a new conception of large-scale form, in which groups of three very similar pieces, deliberately interlinked by means of motivic cells, harmonic events and recurring interval patterns, combine to constitute a unified work." Satie called this tripartite structure he invented "an absolutely original form" that was "good in itself," a means of exploring a central musical idea from three different perspectives without resorting to traditional variation techniques. In place of continuous development we are given mosaic-like progressions of unresolved dissonances, shifting between movement and stasis, which imbue the stately dignity of the sarabande with a suspended, timeless quality.

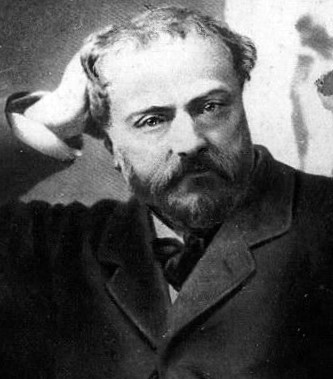
Emmanuel Chabrier

The possible influence of Chabrier on Satie's advanced harmonic language of the 1880s has long been noted, by Maurice Ravel in the 1920s and biographer Rollo H. Myers (1948) up to the present, focusing on the similarities of the unresolved ninths in the Sarabandes and those found in the Prelude of Le roi malgré lui. Yet there are signs Satie was already feeling his way towards a harmonic "no-man's land" in the unconventional ninths and even thirteenths that appear in his 3 mélodies (to poems by Latour) of 1886, and his tonal approach in the Sarabandes is radically different. Chabrier's dissonances in Le roi malgré lui enrich the musical color but function within a traditional dramatic framework; Satie's dissonances become musical events in themselves. Or as pianist-author Joseph Smith put it, "For Chabrier, the A.1. Sauce; for Satie, the steak." Robert Orledge proposed that Chabrier's real impact lay in "proving to Satie that the Wagnerian path was the wrong one for a composer of wit and originality to follow."

In an early instance of Satie appending an extramusical text to one of his compositions, the score of the Sarabande No. 1 was originally prefaced by a stanza from Latour's poem La Perdition (The Damnation):

Suddenly the heavens opened and the damned fell,
Hurtling and colliding in a gigantic whirlwind;
And when they were alone in the sunless night,
They discovered they were wholly black. Then they blasphemed.

These apocalyptic verses bear no obvious relation to the music, though they do reflect Satie's growing religious preoccupations, perhaps with a dash of humor. The sarabande was once ruled indecent and banned in Spain, causing author Miguel de Cervantes to jokingly claim it was a dance born and bred in hell. Satie's inquiring mind kept him well-versed in the history of the established musical forms he tackled, leading pianist-musicologist Olof Höjer to wonder if this knowledge accounted for both the otherwise arcane Latour quote and the "unmistakeable hint of decadent sensuality" he found in the Sarabandes. Three decades later Satie would overtly satirize the controversy over another "Dance of the Devil" from the west condemned by the Catholic Church - the tango - in his piano suite Sports et divertissements (1914).

The Sarabandes also offer the first example of Satie the musical "prankster" with their odd enharmonic notation, which can cause needless difficulties for the performer. Joseph Smith observed, "Pianistically, anyone who can play the Gymnopédies can play the Sarabandes; however, the modal Gymnopédies are easy to read, whereas the Sarabandes, with their unsightly globs of flats and double-flats, can cause the eyes of the most facile reader to cross and glaze over. Some believe that this discouraging note-spelling is Satie's way of teasing the player, and certainly it would be consistent with Satiean humor, which can be interpreted as self-deprecating, disarming - or hostile."

== Performance and publication ==
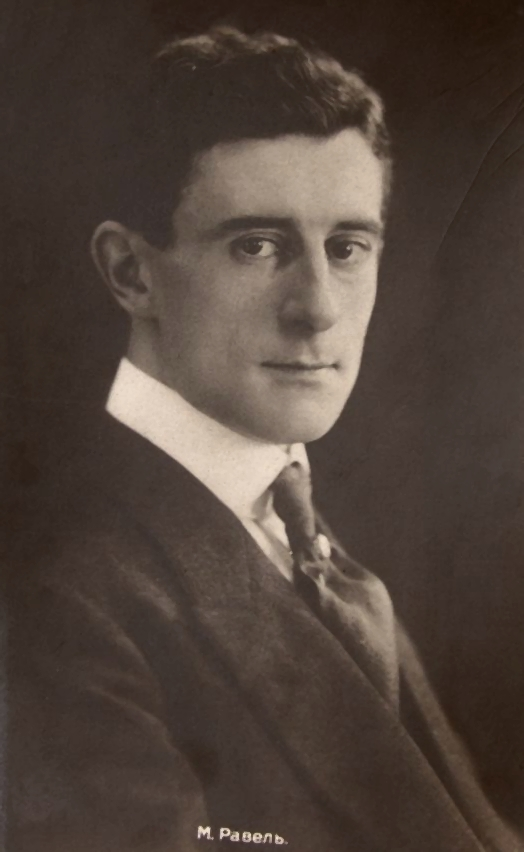
Maurice Ravel, 1910

Unlike the Gymnopédies and the earlier piano suite Ogives (1886), which he published at his own expense in the late 1880s, Satie initially chose not to promote the intermediate Sarabandes. He did not keep them a secret from his intimates, however. They were the probable model for his friend Claude Debussy's Sarabande, composed in 1894 and revised before its inclusion in the set Pour le piano (1901). In an article on his brother's music for the June 1895 issue of the esoteric religious journal Le coeur, Conrad Satie referred to the unpublished Sarabandes as the "works of a mystic pagan, and which give a foretaste of the Catholic who was to write the Danses gothiques." Maurice Ravel, who first met Satie in 1893, knew of the pieces and spoke highly of them to members of his circle. In 1905 Ravel introduced critic Michel-Dimitri Calvocoressi to Satie, who showed him the manuscript of the Sarabandes. Calvocoressi later declared, "I promptly saw the truth in Ravel's assertion that Satie's music contained the germ of many things in the modern developments of music."

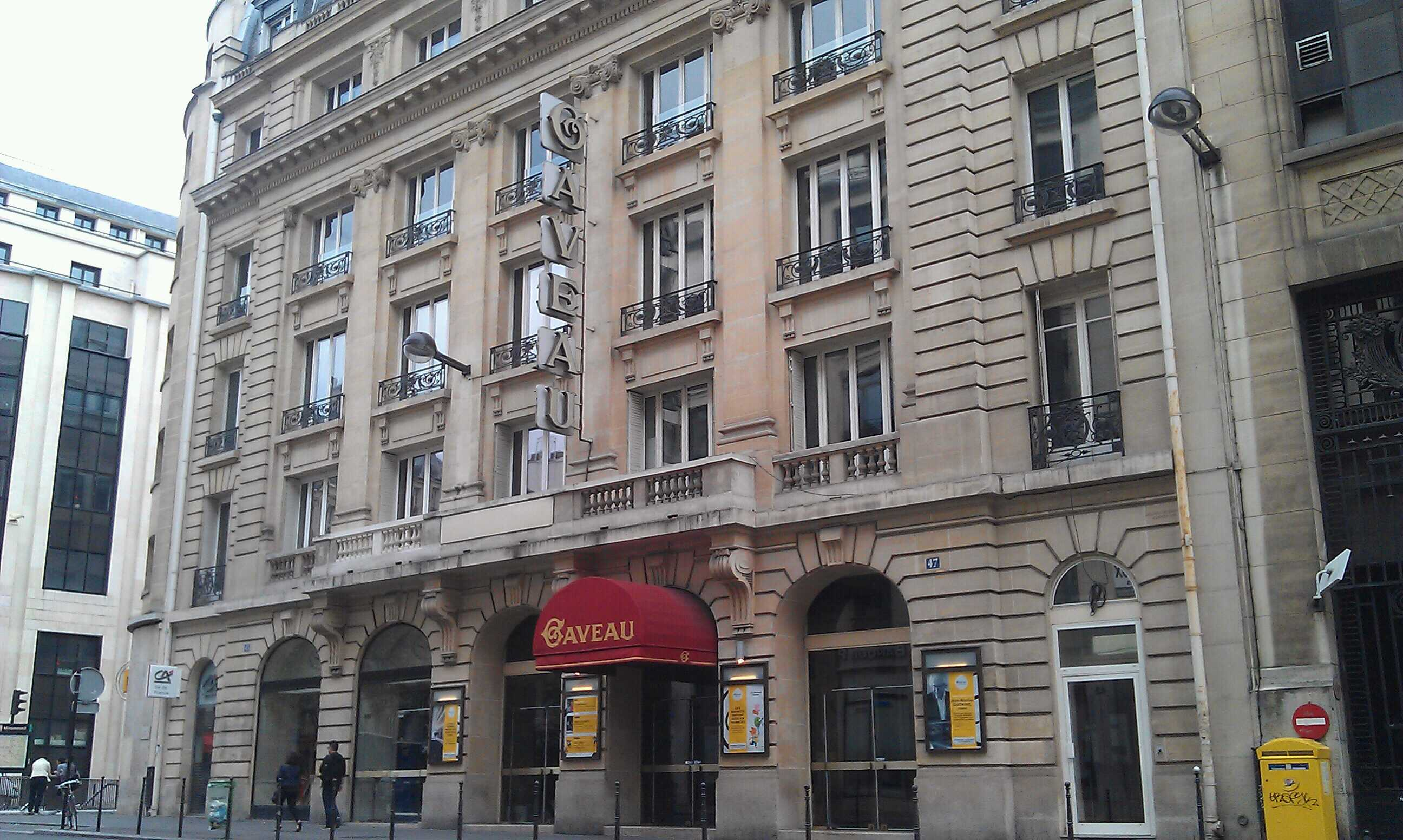
Salle Gaveau

In 1909 Ravel resigned from the Société Nationale de Musique (SNM), which he felt had become too conservative, and founded the Société musicale indépendante (SMI) to spotlight new and neglected composers. For the first concert of the SMI's second season, on January 16, 1911, Ravel personally played Satie's second Sarabande, a prelude from Le Fils des étoiles (1892), and the third Gymnopédie at the Salle Gaveau in Paris. The unsigned program note praised Satie as "a precursor of genius...With today's performance of the Second Sarabande (which bears the astonishing date of 1887), Maurice Ravel will prove the esteem in which the most 'advanced' composers hold this creator who, a quarter century ago, was already speaking the audacious musical idiom of tomorrow." Satie himself boasted that Ravel's performance was "a revelation" to many in the Parisian musical scene.

The Sarabande No. 1 was first published in the magazine associated with Ravel's society, the Revue musicale SIM, on March 15, 1911, and the second Sarabande appeared as a supplement in the April 1911 issue of Musica. Rouart, Lerolle & Cie published the complete Sarabandes in the summer of 1911. For this first commercial edition Satie removed the Latour poem and dedicated the second Sarabande to Ravel in gratitude for his sponsorship.

== Aftermath ==
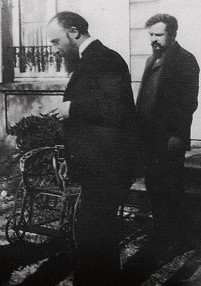
Erik Satie and Claude Debussy in the early 1910s

Ravel's admiration for Satie's early music was sincere and lasting, but his promotion of it through the SMI was not without intrigue. One of his aims in bringing to light obscure contemporary composers like Satie was to challenge the reputation of his chief rival, Debussy, as the wellspring of all modern trends in French music. It is significant that the SMI program note enthused over the unknown Sarabandes and said nothing of the Gymnopédies, two of which had been orchestrated by Debussy and performed at his urging by the SNM in 1897. Debussy was quick to recognize that Ravel was using Satie against him. He tried to counter the SMI's propaganda - with its implications that he had done nothing to help his old friend earlier - by adding his orchestral versions of the Gymnopédies to an all-Debussy concert he was scheduled to conduct for the Cercle Musical. Reporting this development to Ravel on March 4, Satie wrote, "That's something I owe to you. Thank You." The two Gymnopédies were the surprise hit of Debussy's March 25 program at the Salle Gaveau. Their success overshadowed Debussy's music, and Debussy did not hide his feelings of resentment from Satie.

The Ravel and Debussy concerts of 1911 made Satie famous in Paris, but the politics behind them would sour and ultimately destroy his relations with both men - in Debussy's case, probably the closest friendship he ever had.

Conservative critics in the French capital did not welcome Satie's sudden emergence from obscurity. If he was remembered at all it was for his bohemian antics of the 1890s (challenging the director of the Paris Opera to a duel, founding his own church to attack his enemies) or his association with the Rose + Croix sect. Journalist and minor composer Jean Poueigh, writing under his pseudonym Octave Seré, briefly mentioned Satie in his 1911 book Musiciens français d'aujourd'hui (French Musicians Today) as "a clumsy but subtle technician" whose Sarabandes had deeply impressed the young Debussy; he condescendingly added that "not too much importance should be attached to it." But Ravel's championship, Roland-Manuel's fervent praise during World War I, and later testimony from such distinguished musicians as Charles Koechlin, Darius Milhaud, Georges Auric and Alfred Cortot, led Satie biographer Rollo H. Myers to conclude that by the World War II years there seemed to be "a consensus of opinion" that the Sarabandes anticipated some of the harmonic processes of modern French music.

== Recordings ==
Aldo Ciccolini (twice for EMI, 1968 and 1988), Frank Glazer (Vox, 1968), Jean-Joël Barbier (Universal Classics France, 1971), Reinbert de Leeuw (Harlekijn, 1975, reissued by Philips, 1980), France Clidat (Forlane, 1984), Jean-Pierre Armengaud (Circé, 1990), Klára Koermendi (Naxos, 1993), Bojan Gorišek (Audiophile Classics, 1994), Olof Höjer (Swedish Society Discofil, 1996), Pascal Rogé (Decca, 2000), Jean-Yves Thibaudet (Decca, 2003), Steffen Schleiermacher (MDG, 2003), Cristina Ariagno (Brilliant Classics, 2006), Håkon Austbø (Brilliant Classics, 2006), Chisako Okano (Bella Musica, 2014).
