= Petit Prélude de 'La Mort de Monsieur Mouche' =

1900 piano composition by Erik Satie

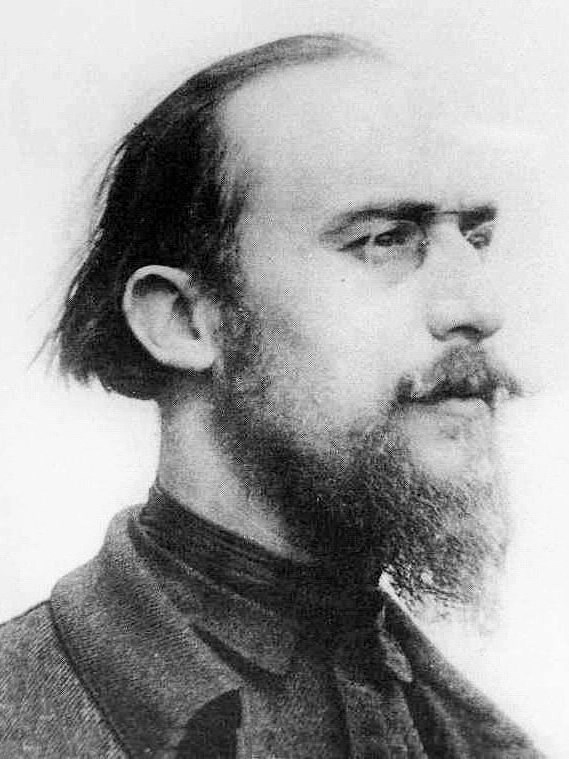
Erik Satie

The Petit Prélude de 'La Mort de Monsieur Mouche' (A Little Prelude to "The Death of Mr. Fly") is a 1900 piano composition by Erik Satie. It was written to introduce a three-act play by J. P. Contamine de Latour, writing under the pseudonym "Lord Cheminot". The play itself is lost and Satie's music went unpublished for many years. In performance the piece lasts under 2 minutes.

This unassuming miniature marked the first time Satie used ragtime syncopations, making him a forerunner amongst European composers in exploring early American jazz.

== Description ==
La Mort de Monsieur Mouche was one of several Satie-Contamine de Latour projects that were started and abandoned around the turn of the 20th century. Like their previous work Geneviève de Brabant (c. 1900), it was probably intended for the shadow puppet theatres of Montmartre. All we know of the play are a few jottings in Satie's hand: Acts One and Three are set "in a restaurant" and Act Two takes place "chez Monsieur Mouche". Given Satie's fondness for anthropomorphic humor it is reasonable to assume what kind of Parisian habitué Mr. Fly is.

1903 movie clip of African-American dancers performing a cakewalk

The rather ominous sound of the title is nowhere reflected in the music. Marked animé ("lively") in the score, it is a comically discordant cakewalk in accentuated 2/4 time, mixed with irregular, almost "drunken" phrasing. A gentler middle section (pas lent) slows down the stride for a bit, and after a restatement of the first theme the piece ends quietly.

French entertainer Eugénie Fougère had introduced the cakewalk and other "negro dances" to Paris in late 1899 or early 1900, following a long tour of the United States. Satie was then delving into pop music influences and immediately decided that the novelty would make a good introduction to Contamine de Latour's play. He registered his ragtime-inspired Petit Prélude with SACEM on April 18, 1900. Perhaps Satie was ahead of his time: In May John Philip Sousa and his band began playing American cakewalks during their appearances at the 1900 Paris Exposition, but the dance and accompanying musical style would not become a national craze in France until two years later. For whatever reason the music and script of La Mort de Monsieur Mouche were cast aside, the latter to vanish permanently.

Nevertheless this early experiment had important repercussions for Satie's subsequent development and for other French composers (notably Les Six) who would find inspiration in popular music. His close friend Claude Debussy famously included a cakewalk in his piano suite Children's Corner (1908) and Satie himself revisited the ragtime rhythms of Monsieur Mouche in cabaret songs (La Diva de l'Empire) and in his ballets Parade (1917) and La Belle Excentrique (1920).

After Satie's death the Petit Prélude de 'La Mort de Monsieur Mouche' resided in the music archives of the Bibliothèque nationale de France. In 1968 Robert Caby included it in his edition of the composer's unpublished manuscripts, Carnet d'Esquisses et de Croquis (Notebook of Sketches and Rough Drafts). It was republished by Salabert in 1989. The Petit Prélude stands out amidst the various fragments and exercises, but the Carnet collection is usually performed and recorded as a whole.

== Recordings ==
Aldo Ciccolini (EMI, 1987), Klára Körmendi (Naxos Records, 1994), Bojan Gorišek (Audiophile Classics, 1994), Olof Höjer (Swedish Society Discofil, 1996), Pascal Rogé (Decca, 1997), Jean-Yves Thibaudet (Decca, 2003), Steffen Schleiermacher (MDG, 2003), Noriko Ogawa (BIS, 2016), Nicolas Horvath (Grand Piano, 2019).
