= Le Fils des étoiles =

1891 incidental music composition by Erik Satie

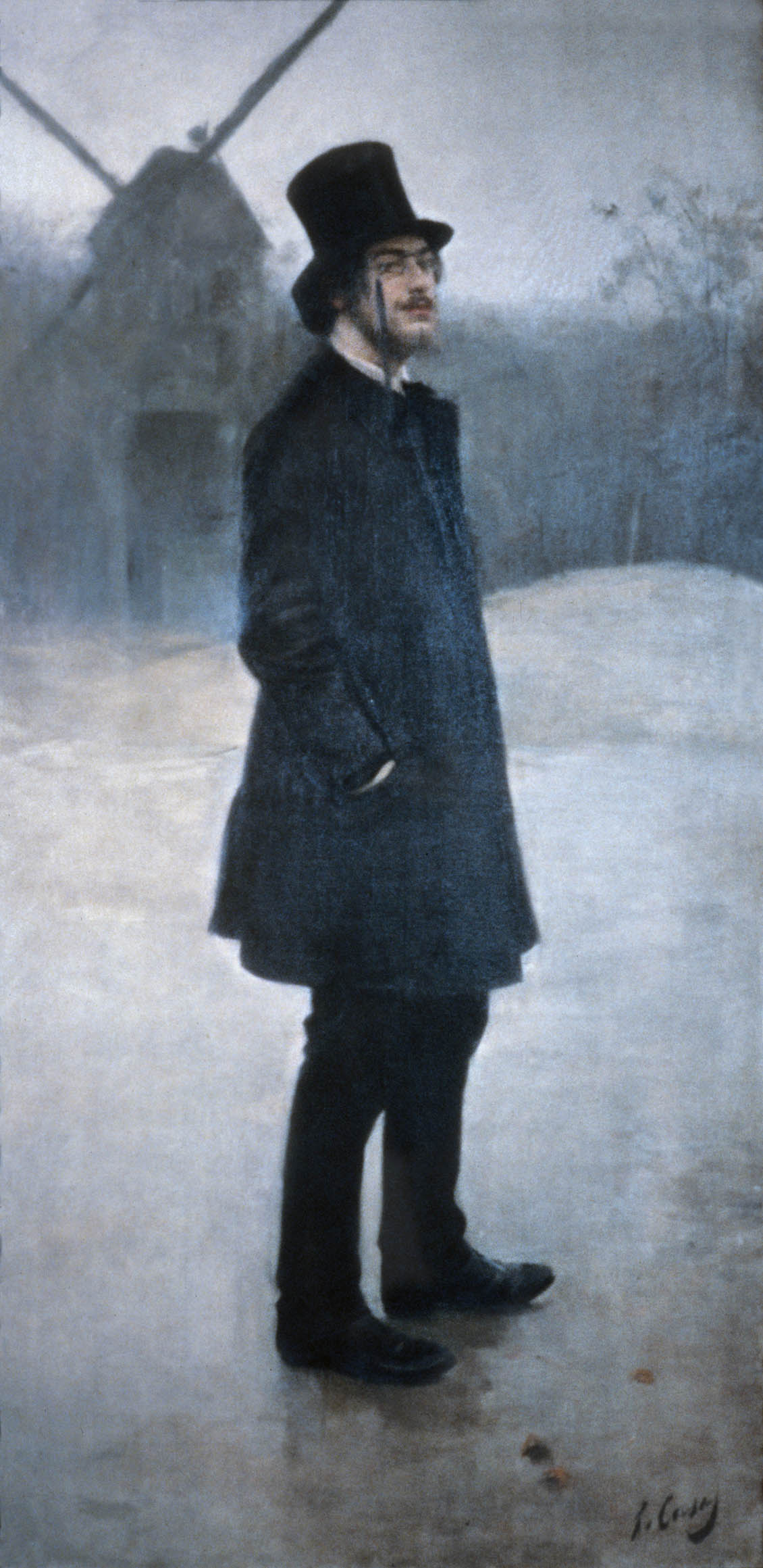
Erik Satie in 1891

Le Fils des étoiles (The Son of the Stars) is an incidental music score composed in December 1891 by Erik Satie to accompany a three-act poetic drama of the same name by Joséphin Péladan. It is a key work of Satie's "Rosicrucian" period (1891–1895) and played a role in his belated "discovery" by the French musical establishment in the 1910s.

Satie provided some 75 minutes' worth of music for Péladan's play, apparently intended for flutes and harps, and this represents his longest through-composed surviving score. However, only his three short act Preludes were performed at the premiere in Paris on March 22, 1892. Satie subsequently arranged the Preludes for solo piano and published them in 1896. It is through these keyboard excerpts that the music for Le Fils des étoiles is primarily known.

The Preludes have been cited as among Satie's most radical compositions, with their forward-looking explorations of quartal harmony and the composer's conception of theatre music as a "static sound décor", functioning independently of the stage action. In 1922 the American critic Lawrence Gilman heard in Le Fils des étoiles "harmonic inventions which sound for all the world like passages to which Stravinsky and Schoenberg, twenty years later, were signing their names with a noble gesture of revolutionary defiance ..."

== Background ==
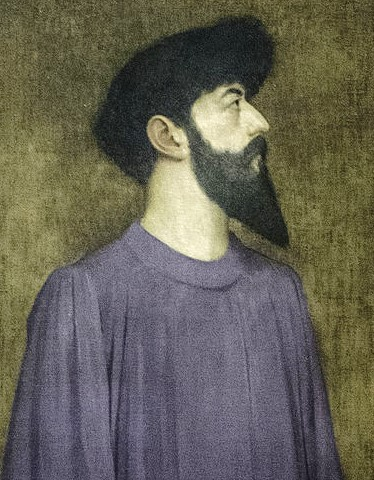
Joséphin Péladan

Satie wrote the score for Le Fils des étoiles during his short-lived involvement (1891–1892) as official composer and chapelmaster of the Mystic Order of the Rose + Croix. This esoteric-religious-artistic group, led by the flamboyant Péladan, aimed to "ruin realism, reform Latin taste and create a school of idealist art" in 1890s France. Particular reverence was paid to Symbolist art and to the music of Richard Wagner, whom the Rosicrucians valued above all composers. After the Comédie-Française in Paris rejected the script for Le Fils des etoiles in 1891, Péladan gained financial backing from Count Antoine de La Rochefoucauld to launch the annual Salon de la Rose + Croix (1892–1897) for the promotion of his work and ideas. The premiere staging of Le Fils would feature prominently in the first Rosicrucian salon.

Péladan alternately subtitled his play a "Chaldean Pastoral" or a "Wagnérie Kaldéenne", the latter a reference to the author's Wagner fixation. It is a Tannhäuser-like tale set in Chaldea around 3000 BC. A shepherd—the titular "son of the stars"—is chosen to join the Chaldean priesthood, but is faced with conflicts which force him to choose between the spirit and the flesh. Stage action is largely replaced by philosophical monologues which one contemporary critic described as "something like literary music":

That which is above is like that which is below;
And that which is below
Is like that which is above to accomplish the miracles of will.
Will rises from the earth to the sky
And then descends once more on to the earth
Receiving the strength of superior and inferior things.

Satie kept his thoughts on Péladan's play to himself, but he clearly had no intention of composing the kind of "Wagnerian" accompaniment the Rosicrucians would have preferred. In fact his remote and deliberately non-dramatic music is anti-Wagnerian in stylistic principle, without resorting to parody. When Satie broke with the Rose + Cross sect in an open letter to the journal Gil Blas in August 1892 he declared, "The good Monsieur Péladan ... never influenced the independence of my aesthetic."

The early 1890s also saw the blossoming of Satie's close friendship with Claude Debussy. Their youthful discussions about the future of French music—as recalled many years later by Satie and his propagandist Jean Cocteau—provide our only clues to his creative mindset of the period. In a 1922 public lecture on Debussy, Satie maintained: "When I first met him he was full of Mussorgsky, and very conscientiously was seeking a path which he had difficulty in finding .... At that time I was writing music for Le Fils des étoiles to a text by Joséphin Péladan, and I explained to Debussy the necessity for a Frenchman to free himself from the Wagnerian adventure which in no way corresponded to our national aspirations. And I told him that I was not anti-Wagner in any way but that we ought to have our own music—if possible without sauerkraut." And Cocteau related a conversation with Debussy in which he claimed the composer directly quoted Satie's ideas on the function of dramatic music: "There is no need for the orchestra to grimace when a character comes on the stage. Do the trees in the scenery grimace? What we have to do is to create a musical scenery, a musical atmosphere in which the characters move and talk." The veracity of these statements, both made after Debussy's death in 1918, cannot be known for sure, as Debussy himself never openly acknowledged (in words at least) Satie as an influence. But they precisely define the modus operandi of Satie's music for Le Fils des étoiles.

== Music ==
Satie's original incidental score consists of three short act preludes and three substantially longer "Decorative Themes":

1. Prelude du Premier Acte: La Vocation (The Vocation) – Theme Decoratif: La Nuit Kaldee (A Night in Chaldea)
2. Prelude du Deuxieme Acte: L'Initiation (The Initiation) – Theme Decoratif: La Salle Basse du Grand Temple (The Lower Hall of the Great Temple)
3. Prelude du Troisieme Acte: L'Incantation (The Incantation) – Theme Decoratif: La Terrace du Palais du Patesi Goudea (The Terrace of Patesi Goudea's Palace)

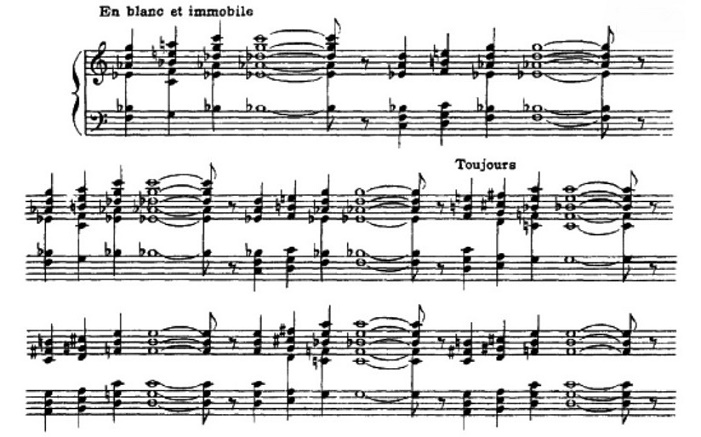
Opening of the first Prelude from Le Fils des étoiles, with its harmonically innovative "stacks" of fourths

The entire score is woven from 10 identifiable motifs, nine of which are variations or slight developments of the opening of the first Prelude. Biographer Steven Moore Whiting found in the three Preludes a self-sufficient interlinked structure that "forms a kind of palindrome", with the melodic ideas shifted about in a "compositional shell game." An exception in the overall motivic scheme is the little Gnossienne-style dance that appears in the "decorative" music for Act 1. Satie would later reuse this piece as the Maniere de commencement of his famous suite for piano duet, Trois morceaux en forme de poire (1903).

Satie's lengthy "Decorative Themes" (accounting for 4/5 of the score) are aloof, heavily chordal and repetitive, with occasional reference to material from the preludes. They were apparently intended to serve as an unobtrusive sonic backdrop for the stage action. The pieces are not synchronized with Péladan's text and may have been omitted at the premiere for practical reasons.

The brochure for the 1892 Le Fils des étoiles premiere states that Satie wrote his score for flutes and harps. Satie's manuscript exists only in his 1896 piano reduction, with no indication of how the flute and harp parts might have been distributed. In his book Satie the Composer (1990), Robert Orledge pointed out problems of tuning and intonation for the harpists which would have made the music impractical to play as written, so the nature of its first performance remains a mystery.

== Premiere ==
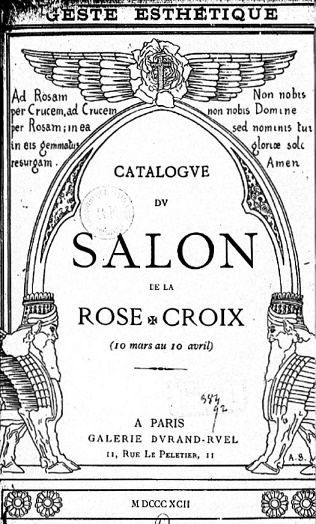
Catalogue of the first Salon de la Rose + Croix (1892)

Le Fils des étoiles premiered at the Galerie Durand-Ruel in Paris on March 22, 1892, as part of Péladan's first Salon de la Rose + Croix. The program note announced that Satie's three Preludes, "of an admirably Oriental character", would "prepare the spectator impatiently for the tableau he is going to see." The play was not a success and the audience greeted the unusual score with a puzzled silence. Writing of the chilly response to Satie's music, Robert Orledge mused that "Probably the only impatience it generated was for it to be over."

The Rose + Croix salon, a high-profile event, marked the first time Satie's music was publicly performed outside the cabarets of Montmartre where he toiled as a second-string pianist. It also introduced him to the downside of notoriety. Only one critic commented on his music for Le Fils, but he was among the most powerful in Paris: Henry Gauthier-Villars, ubiquitously known by his pen name Willy.

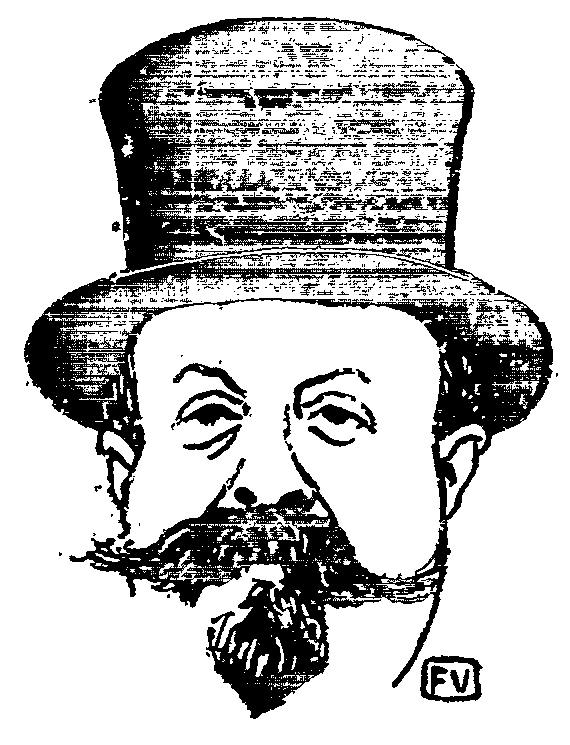
Willy, 1896

In his March 26, 1892 column for L'Écho de Paris, Willy dismissively identified Satie as the "ex-pianist of the ground floor at the Chat Noir" and described his Preludes as "nervous" because "one doesn't know which end to grab them by." He concluded with a pun on the composer's name, writing that this "faucet salesman's music" had only given him "indifferent Satiesfaction." The quarrelsome Satie had never been attacked in print before, and Willy's review instigated a sporadic war of words between composer and critic that lasted more than a decade. Over the years Satie would denounce Willy as a "dull-witted pen-pusher" and "dreary piece of literary garbage" in open letters to the press, private correspondence, and in his publications as leader of his own mock-religious sect, the Metropolitan Church of Art of Jesus the Conductor. Willy countered by ridiculing Satie in his widely-read columns as a "mystical sausage-brain," an "esoteric slut," a "penniless street musician," and "a Debussy who passed through Charenton". The hostilities climaxed in April 1904 when the two had a physical altercation during a Camille Chevillard concert. Pianist Ricardo Viñes—later one of Satie's most important champions—witnessed the incident and wrote in his diary, "Willy struck Erik Satie with his cane after Satie had intentionally thrown Willy's hat on the floor. The city police took Satie away."

Satie's lifelong hatred of critics, whom he referred to as his "faithful enemies", likely dates from his protracted feud with Willy. Critics became a favorite target of his mature literary satire (e.g., the Mémoires d'un amnésique and the 1921 essay "A Hymn in Praise of Critics"), and his antagonism nearly landed him in prison during World War I, when he was convicted of criminal libel for sending profanely insulting postcards to a well-known reviewer.

== Later history ==
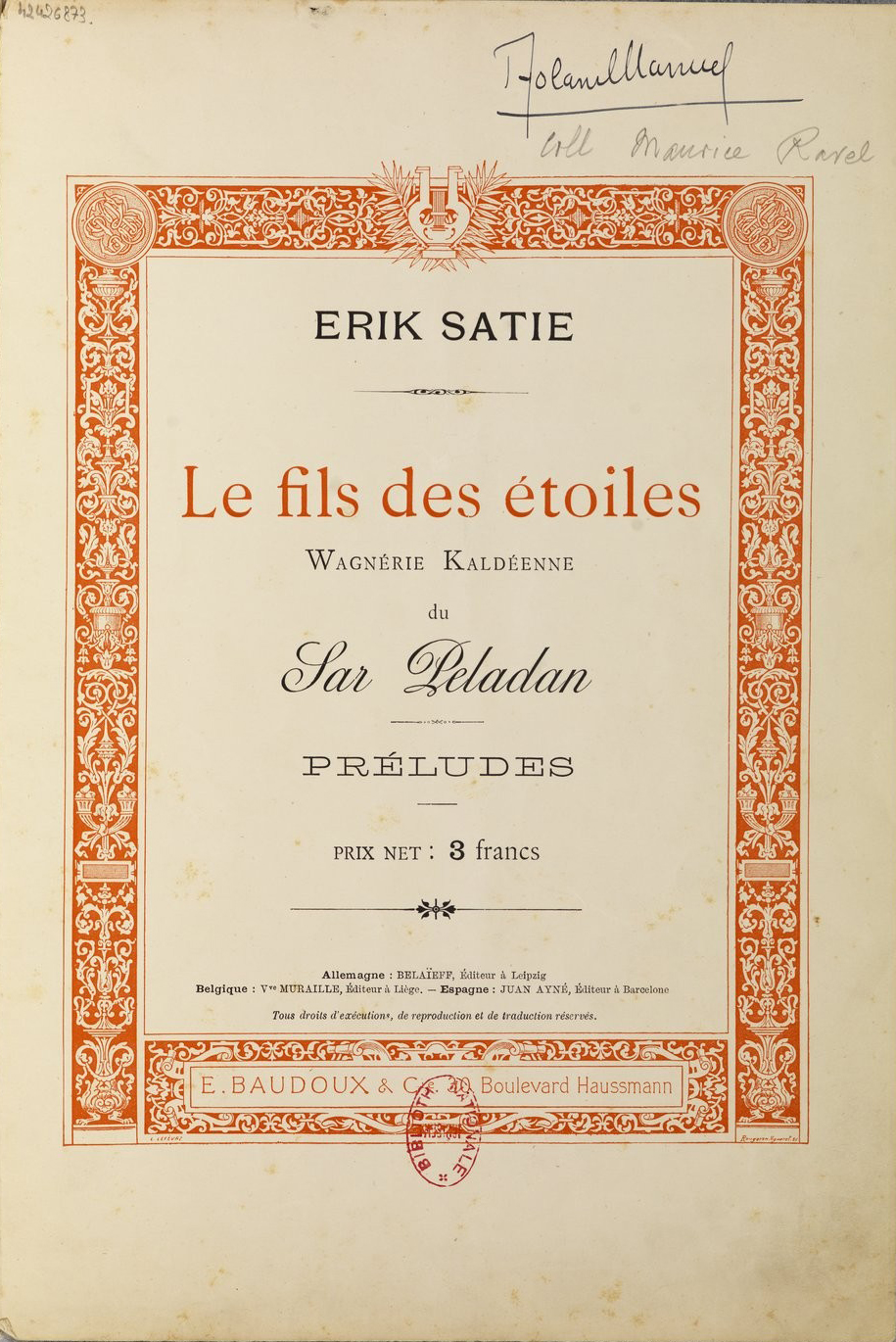
Original edition of Satie's Preludes from Le fils des étoiles (1896). This was Maurice Ravel's personal copy, which he later gave to Alexis Roland-Manuel.

The three Preludes for Le Fils des étoiles, reduced for piano, were first published by E. Baudoux & Cie in 1896. Satie removed the bar lines from the score and added playing directions that further emphasized the music's non-dramatic nature: "White and immobile," "Pale and hieratic," "Like a gentle request," "Complacently lonely," "Watch from afar."

Maurice Ravel, then a 21-year-old student of the Paris Conservatoire, was among those who bought a copy of this original edition. He had first met Satie in 1893 and was deeply impressed with his harmonic experiments. In 1911, when Ravel was established as one of France's leading composers, he programmed some of Satie's early piano pieces at a concert sponsored by his progressive Société musicale indépendante (SMI), which began to promote him as an important forerunner of modern trends in French music. Ravel himself played the first Prelude to Le Fils des étoiles, the second Sarabande (1887), and the third Gymnopédie (1888). The unsigned program note for this concert spoke of Satie thus:

On the margins of his own epoch, this isolated figure long ago wrote several brief pages
that are those of a precursor of genius. These works, unfortunately few in number,
surprise one through their prescience of modern vocabulary and through the
quasi-prophetical character of certain harmonic discoveries ...

In the years before World War I Ravel planned to orchestrate the Preludes but apparently never got beyond the first; his manuscript is now lost. An orchestral version was subsequently created by a disciple of both Ravel and Satie, Alexis Roland-Manuel.

The complete score, unearthed and edited by Robert Caby, was first published by Salabert in 1973. Its premiere recording was by pianist-musicologist Christopher Hobbs (1989), who produced his own critical edition in 2003. Steffen Schleiermacher published an Urtext edition in 2015.

According to Jean Cocteau, Satie's early ideas of "musical scenery" represented by Le Fils des étoiles "determined the aesthetic" of Debussy's landmark opera Pelléas et Mélisande (1902). Satie himself never completed an opera, but in later years he carried his concept of non-dramatic music further—out of the theatre, in fact. It was the germ of his post-World War I musique d’ameublement ("furniture music"), background scores for social events specifically designed not to be listened to.

== Recordings ==
Complete: Christopher Hobbs (twice, London Hall, 1989 and EMC, 2003), Steffen Schleiermacher (MDG, 2001), Alexei Lubimov (Passacaille, 2013), Jeroen van Veen (Brilliant Classics, 2016), Alessandro Simonetto (Aevea, 2016), Nicolas Horvath (Grand Piano, 2017), Alessandro Simonetto (OnClassical, 2021).

Preludes (piano): Aldo Ciccolini (EMI, 1971, 1988), Jean-Joël Barbier (Universal Classics France, 1971), France Clidat (Forlane, 1984), Jean-Pierre Armengaud (Le Chant Du Monde, 1986), Bill Quist (Windham Hill, 1986), Satsuki Shibano (Firebird, 1987), Riri Shimada (Sony, 1987), Bojan Gorišek (Audiophile Classics, 1994), Reinbert de Leeuw (Philips, 1996), Olof Höjer (Swedish Society Discofil, 1996), Pascal Rogé (Decca, 1997), Roland Pöntinen (BIS, 1998), Peter Dickinson (Olympia, 2001), Jean-Yves Thibaudet (Decca, 2003), Cristina Ariagno (Brilliant Classics, 2006), Chisako Okano (Bella Musica, 2014), Noriko Ogawa (BIS, 2017).

Preludes (orchestra): Maurice Abravanel, Utah Symphony Orchestra (Vanguard, 1968).
