= Soe Tjen Marching =

Indonesian writer and academician

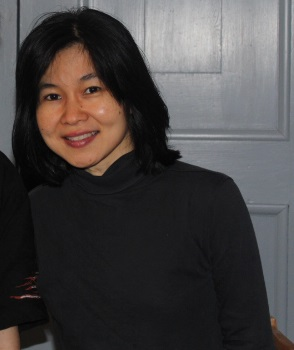
Soe Tjen Marching

Soe Tjen Marching (born April 23, 1971, in Surabaya, Indonesia) is a writer, academician, activist, and a composer of avant-garde music from Indonesia. In 1998, she won the national competition for Indonesian Contemporary Composers held by the German Embassy. Her compositions have been played in New Zealand, Indonesia and Japan. Her work has been released on the CD Asia Piano Avantgarde - Indonesia, played by pianist Steffen Schleiermacher. In 2010, her work has been selected as one of the two best compositions in the International Competition for avant-garde composers held in Singapore. In her musical career, she has been mainly an autodidact.

Besides being a composer, Marching is also a creative writer and a senior lecturer teaching Indonesian at SOAS in London. She holds a master's degree from the University of Canterbury, and she completed her PhD at Monash University in Australia. Her book, The Discrepancy between the Public and the Private Selves of Indonesian Women was published by The Edwin Mellen Press (2007). She has also won several creative writing competitions in Australia and has been published in Australia, the United States and the United Kingdom. She is married to Angus Nicholls, a literary scholar at Queen Mary University, London. Her novel, Mati Bertahun yang Lalu, was published by Gramedia (Jakarta - Indonesia) in November 2010. Her book about Indonesian women Kisah di Balik Pintu was published by Ombak in 2011 and her book about a woman suffering from cancer, Kubunuh di Sini, was published by Gramedia in 2013. In 2017, her book on the 1965 genocide in Indonesia entitled The End of Silence: Accounts of the 1965 Genocide in Indonesia, was published by Amsterdam University Press. As of 2023, she has published over ten books. The latest is a collection of poetry entitled Tiga Kitab [Three Books], based on the Holy Bible but in the perspective of the Devil.

In 2009, Soe Tjen founded a magazine in Indonesia called Majalah Bhinneka (Bhinneka Magazine), which promotes critical thinking about gender, politics and religions. Soe Tjen has written several essays on women, Indonesian politics, and religions in Indonesian, English and German.
