= Jack in the Box (Satie) =

1899 composition by Erik Satie

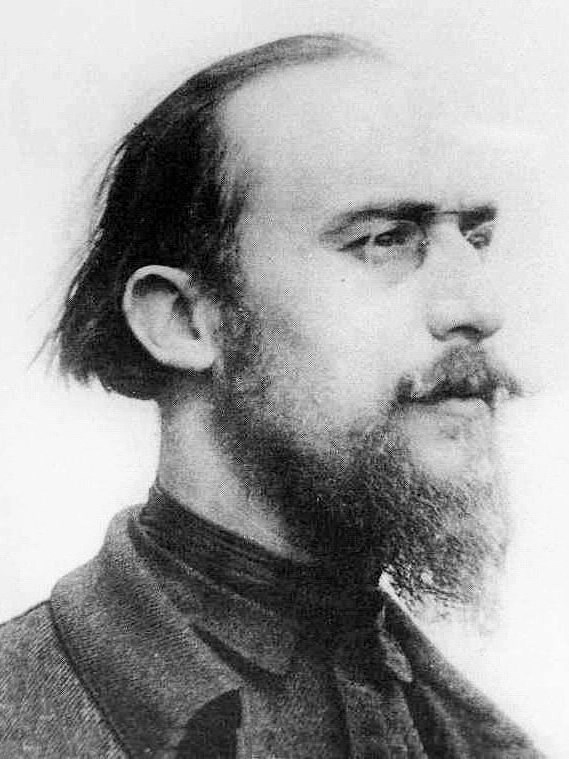
Erik Satie in 1898

Jack in the Box (sometimes seen as Jack-in-the-Box) is a work written by Erik Satie in 1899 for a pantomime-ballet (Satie called it a "clownerie", and also a "suite anglaise") to a scenario by the illustrator Jules Depaquit. Satie gave it an English title because English phrases were considered fashionable in Parisian society at the time.

Satie's intention was to score it also for orchestra. However, after he wrote the piano score, he lost it some time after 1905. Satie believed it had gone missing on a bus and that it would never be found, but after his death it was found in his squalid apartment in Arcueil (some sources say it was hidden inside a notebook lodged down the back of his decrepit piano), along with the lost score for his marionette opera Geneviève de Brabant. Depaquit's scenario has not survived.

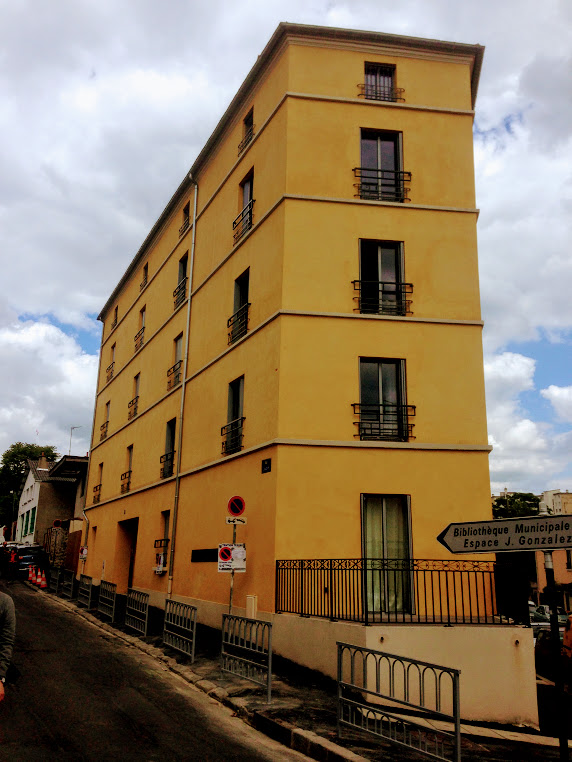
The "House of 4 Chimneys" in Arcueil, where Satie lived from 1898 until his death. Jack in the Box was the first notable work he composed there.

Sergei Diaghilev had approached Satie for ballet music in 1922 and again in 1924, but nothing was forthcoming either time. Satie died in July 1925, and in June 1926, to commemorate the 60th anniversary of his birth, Jack in the Box was produced by Diaghilev's Ballets Russes, with choreography by George Balanchine, settings by André Derain, and the music orchestrated by Satie's friend Darius Milhaud. The ballet received mainly negative comments: French critics called it "banal", while English critics decried it as "pert but hollow."

It was also published as a short suite for solo piano in the form in which Satie left it. The piano and orchestral versions have both received numerous recordings.

The work has three short movements, lasting less than seven minutes.

1. Prélude: Assez vif
2. Entr'acte: Vif
3. Final: Modéré

All the movements are in C major, and all undergo many meter changes between 2/4 and 3/4, the changes often lasting for only a single measure at a time. The music is said to exhibit a bouncy humour and an appealing naivete. It has perky, jaunty rhythms and blurred harmonies.

== External sources ==
- Jack in the Box: Scores at the International Music Score Library Project
