= Patrice Contamine de Latour =

Spanish poet, emigrant to France

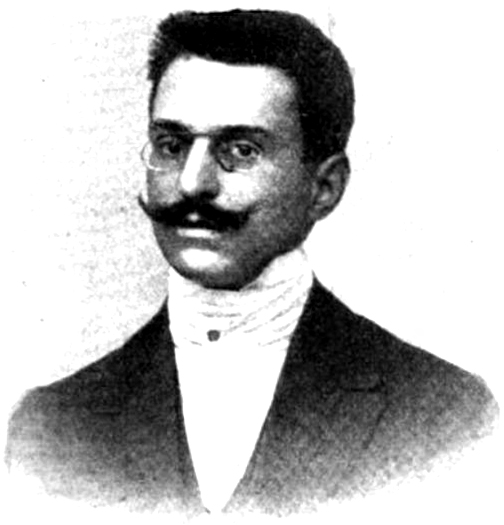
- De Latour, from La presse française au vingtième siècle, in 1901
- Born: José Maria Vicente Ferrer Francisco de Paola Patricio Manuel Contamine; 17 March 1867; Tarragona, Spain
- Died: 24 May 1926 (aged 59); Paris, France
- Occupation: Poet

Patrice Contamine de Latour (17 March 1867 – 24 May 1926), born in Tarragona as José Maria Vicente Ferrer Francisco de Paola Patricio Manuel Contamine and published as J. P. Contamine de Latour, was a Spanish poet who lived in Paris.

He was a friend of composer Erik Satie, whose famous piano suites Sarabandes (1887) and Gymnopédies (1888) were inspired by his poetry. Satie wrote a short comic opera, Geneviève de Brabant, with text by de Latour written under the pseudonym "Lord Cheminot", and also composed the piano piece Le poisson rêveur (The Dreamy Fish) to accompany a lost tale by de Latour. Satie's Petit prélude de 'La Mort de Monsieur Mouche' was written as an introduction to a play by Latour and Satie's unfinished tone poem Le Bœuf Angora was based on Latour's works.

Latour died in Paris.
