= Ogives =

Series of musical compositions

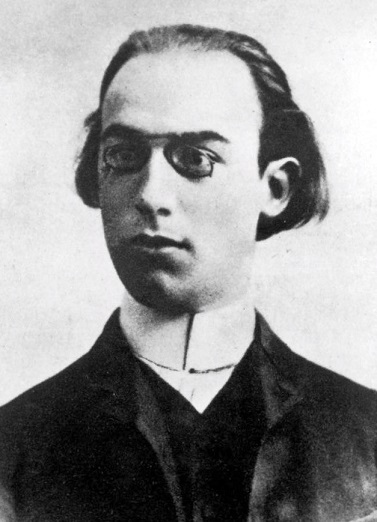
Erik Satie in the late 1880s

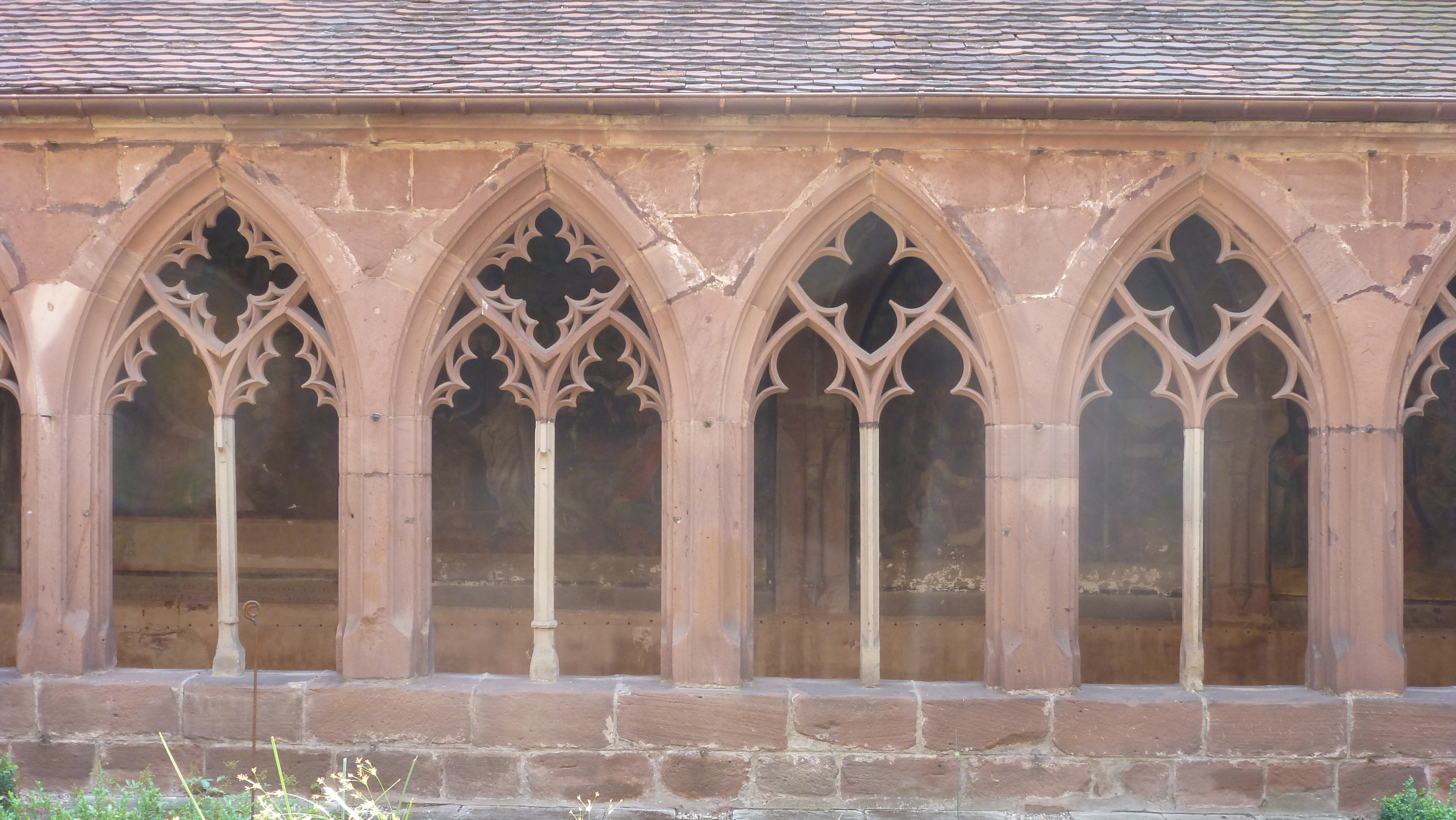
An example of French Gothic ogival arches, the type that inspired Satie's Ogives

The Ogives are four pieces for piano composed by Erik Satie in the late 1880s. They were published in 1889, and were the first compositions by Satie he did not publish in his father's music publishing house.

Satie was said to have been inspired by the form of the windows of the Notre Dame Cathedral in Paris when composing the Ogives. An ogive is the curve that forms the outline of a pointed gothic arch.

The calm, slow melodies of these pieces are built up from paired phrases reminiscent of plainchant. Satie wanted to evoke a large pipe organ reverberating in the depth of a cathedral, and achieved this sonority by using full harmonies, octave doubling and sharply contrasting dynamics.

Satie wrote this music without bar-lines.

== Modern interpretations ==
An arrangement of Ogive No. 2 (incorrectly titled "Ogive number 1") was used in William Orbit's 1999 album Pieces in a Modern Style, and subsequently used in the 1999 film Human Traffic.

== Media ==
- Ogive No. 1, MIDI rendition, 1:30 minutes, 5 KB
- Ogive No. 2 for Charles Levadé, MIDI rendition, 1:32 minutes, 5 KB
- Ogive No. 3, MIDI rendition, 1:47 minutes, 4 KB
- Ogive No. 4 for Conrad Satie, MIDI rendition, 1:35 minutes, 5 KB
