= Ichiyanagi =

Ichiyanagi (written: 一柳 lit. "one willow") is a Japanese surname. Notable people with the surname include:

- Shinobu Ichiyanagi (一柳 忍, born 1952), Japanese candy sculpture artist
- Toshi Ichiyanagi (一柳 慧, 1933−2022), Japanese composer
- Yugo Ichiyanagi (一柳 夢吾, born 1985), Japanese footballer
