= Robert Caby =

French composer and writer

Robert Caby

Robert Caby (Venette, March 25, 1905 - Paris, October 3, 1992) was a French composer and writer. Caby was engaged in writing art criticism and political articles, arranging concerts, creating surrealistic drawings and dealing with rare books and paintings. He had a wide circle of friends who were important musicians and artists of the time including Erik Satie, Darius Milhaud, Pablo Picasso, Francis Poulenc, Charles Koechlin and Henri Sauguet.

In 1950, Caby joined Anne Terrier Laffaille and Marcel Despard to form Groupe Melos. The group adopted Satie's motto "our music is guaranteed playable." Its manifesto stated "enough intellectual esthetics, enough scholarly [pedanticism], down with modern music, down with music for technique's sake, long live music for the people!" Supported by Poulenc and Sauguet, Groupe Melos presented one concert, then faded away.

In the mid-1960s he spent a considerable amount of time at the Bibliothèque nationale, doing research and arrangements of Erik Satie's unpublished works from sketchbooks. In cooperation with Salabert he had all of them published posthumously, leading to an awakening public interest in the composer.

Caby wrote almost 900 works, songs being in majority, with lyrics mostly by famous poets such as Guillaume Apollinaire. Some of his greatest influences were Erik Satie, Emmanuel Chabrier, Claude Debussy, Ludwig van Beethoven and Franz Schubert. In 1947 Marianne Oswald performed some of his chansons in a French radio broadcast. In 1959 the first phonogram record was produced — Jacques Douai performing the song "Belle Belle". It was only in 2001 that a second recording appeared — Olof Höjer performing a wide selection of piano works.
