= Jules Depaquit =

French artist

Jules Depaquit (14 November 1869 - 11 July 1924) was a French illustrator, caricaturist, poet, comics artist, scriptwriter for plays, and lithographer.
