= Geneviève de Brabant (Satie) =

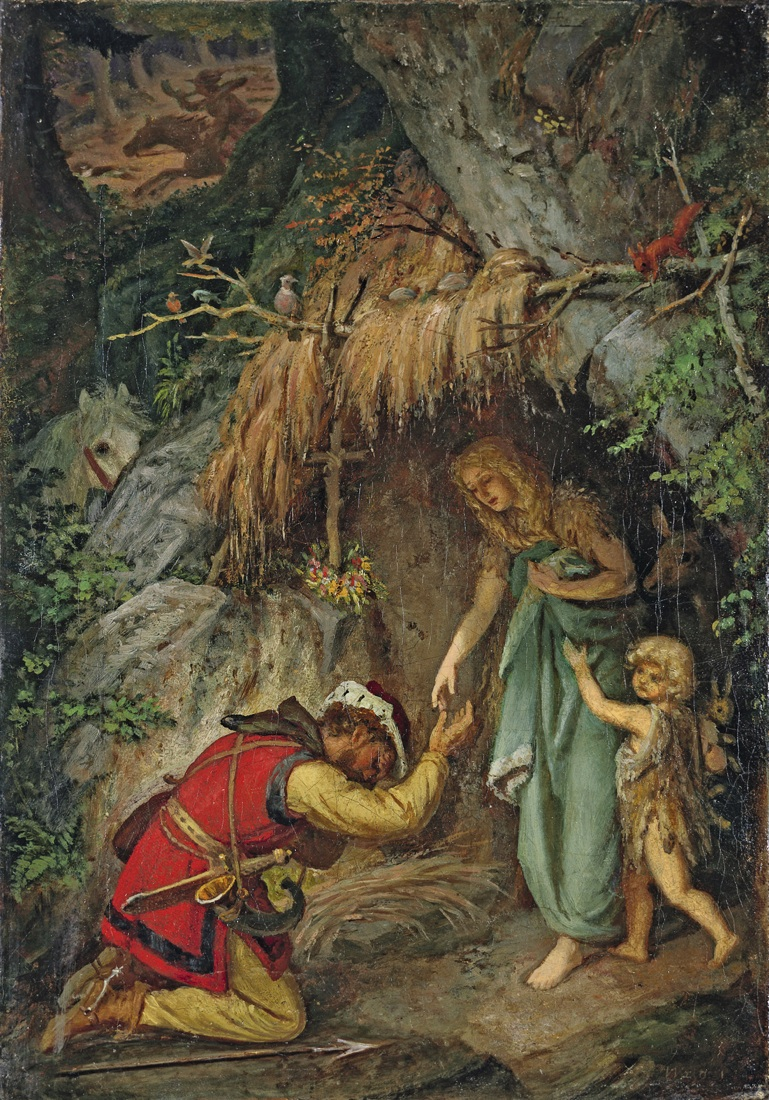
Count Sifroy begs forgiveness from the wronged Geneviève. Painting by Wilhelm Walther

Geneviève de Brabant is a theatre piece composed around 1900 by Erik Satie. The score was intended as incidental music for a three-act comedy in verse and prose by J. P. Contamine de Latour (writing under the pseudonym "Lord Cheminot"), based on the medieval legend of Genevieve of Brabant. Unproduced at the time, its existence was not discovered until after Satie's death in 1925.

Neither author left any indication of how the work should be staged. It was premiered as an "opera for marionettes" at the Théâtre des Champs-Élysées in Paris on May 17, 1926. The conductor was Roger Désormière, who arranged the original piano score for orchestra. As performed today, Geneviève de Brabant retains Satie's music but the narrative is a truncated hodgepodge of Latour's sung arias and spoken interpolations by others.

== Background ==
Between 1899 and 1901 Satie reunited with the boon companion of his Bohemian youth, the writer Contamine de Latour, for several projects that went unfinished or unpublished. The manuscripts of Geneviève de Brabant are undated but provisionally assigned to the year 1900, since Contamine de Latour, who made his living as a journalist, was signing his literary efforts as "Lord Cheminot" during this period. Satie always worked closely with his librettists and probably chose the subject, not least because his close friend Claude Debussy had just completed his opera Pelléas et Mélisande on a similar medieval tale.

Geneviève was a traditional heroine of French puppet theatre and magic lantern shows, and her tear-jerking saga of wronged virtue had already been spoofed by Jacques Offenbach in his Opéra bouffe Geneviève de Brabant (1859, revised 1867). In this vein the satirical tone of the Satie-"Lord Cheminot" piece suggests it was created for the shadow plays of Montmartre cabarets, a form of entertainment both knew well.

== Legend and text ==
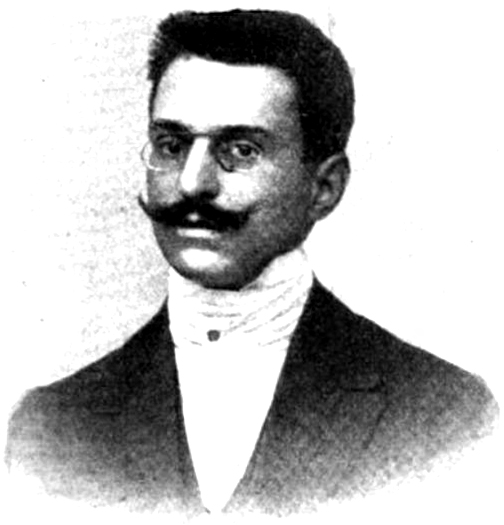
J. P. Contamine de Latour in 1901

The legend originated in the Low Countries during the 12th Century and from there spread to Germany and France. Geneviève was said to be the daughter of the Duke of Brabant and wife of Count Sifroy of Treves. When her husband's trusted majordomo Golo fails to seduce her, he takes his revenge by accusing her of adultery. Sifroy condemns Geneviève and their infant son, but the executioners cannot perform the task and leave them behind in a forest. They find shelter in a cave, where they are nourished and protected by a kindly doe. Six years later, while hunting the doe, Sifroy discovers the hiding place of his wife and child. Geneviève manages to prove her innocence and is restored to honor, but soon dies of her suffering. Golo is then punished for his villainy.

Contamine de Latour's play parodies the noblewoman's misfortunes with insouciant humor and in-jokes aimed at a more sophisticated Parisian audience. Most of the tale's traditional elements are cast aside: Geneviève is childless, she does not encounter a doe, and does not die at the moment of her redemption. Instead of being executed Golo is sent into exile, where he prospers. All ends happily as Geneviève is brought home to the rejoicing of the crowd.

== Music ==
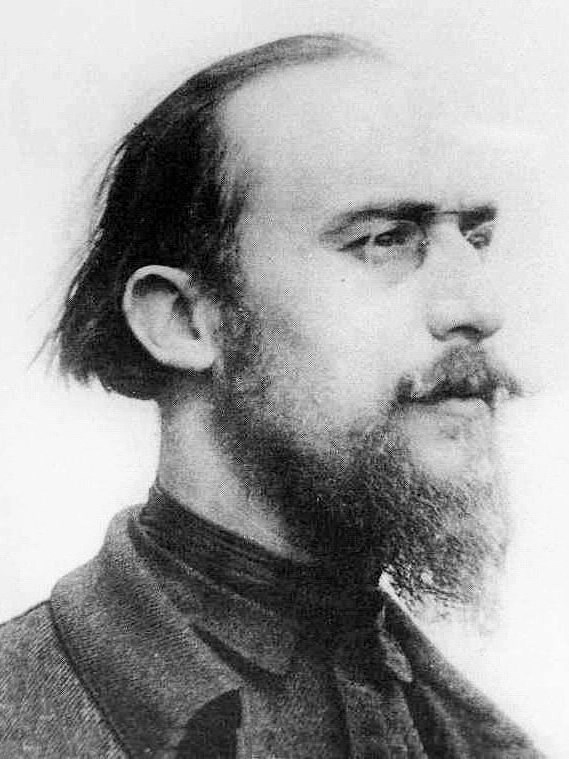
Erik Satie in 1898

Geneviève de Brabant was composed when Satie was transitioning from the stark, semi-religious experimentalism of his Rosicrucian phase - "music on its knees" as he later called it - to a budding interest in popular influences. The score looks both ways, alternating between plainsong and operetta in a brightly colored style of great charm and naiveté. It is considered amongst his most characteristic works of the period.

Satie provided less than 10 minutes worth of music for the hour-long play, a score made even more compact by his recycling of themes. Numbers 4, 7, 8, 9, 11 and 13 all reuse material from the first three numbers, with slight variations (except for the straight repeat of No. 9). Versions of the opening Prelude reappear as the entr'actes, and the recurring Entrance of the Soldiers led one Satie biographer to liken its effect to that of the Promenade in Mussorgsky's Pictures at an Exhibition.

The musical numbers are as follows:

1. Prelude

ACT 1

2. ("We are a tight crowd / That you always find in the First Act")
3. Entrance of the Soldiers

ACT 2

4. Entr'acte
5. Geneviève's Song ("I am innocent of a crime I did not commit"), soprano solo
6. Sounding the Horn
7. Entrance of the Soldiers

ACT 3

8. Entr'acte
9. Chorus (repeat of No. 2)
10. Golo's Song ("No, Sifroy is not dead"), baritone solo
11. Entrance of the Soldiers
12. Procession/March
13. Entrance of the Soldiers
14. Geneviève's Little Song ("Ah! Heaven rewards my virtue, my constancy"),

soprano solo

15. Choral Finale ("The case went well")

Satie originally scored the work for piano, two unspecified male and female vocalists, and mixed unison chorus.

Désormière's 1926 arrangement calls for soprano and baritone soloists, mixed chorus, and an orchestra consisting of 1 flute, 1 oboe, 2 clarinets in B♭, 1 bassoon, 2 horns, 1 cornet, 1 trombone, percussion for 2 players (snare drum, cymbals, bass drum), and strings. A narrator was added for the first public performance and has become standard.

== Discovery, premiere, interpolations ==
The subsequent history of Geneviève de Brabant is sown with mystery and confusion that still haunt the work. Ornella Volta fit most of the puzzle pieces together in her 1987 article "Give a Dog a Bone: Some investigations into Erik Satie."

It appears that by March 1901 Satie had grown unsure of this essentially complete opus. That month he borrowed 16 bars from Geneviève's second aria (No. 14) for another Contamine de Latour collaboration that came to naught, the piano piece Le poisson rêveur (The Dreamy Fish). He did not register the music with SACEM and never spoke of it to anyone, including his young admirers Alexis Roland-Manuel and Paul Collaer, who compiled the first two catalogues of his compositions (1916, 1924). Volta speculated that the shock of seeing Debussy's Pelléas et Mélisande in April 1902 caused Satie to shelve Geneviève for good.

After Satie's death Darius Milhaud was among the first to enter his squalid room in Arcueil, previously off-limits to visitors. Milhaud recalled in his memoirs, "Behind the piano, we found an exercise book containing Jack in the Box and Geneviève de Brabant which Satie thought he had lost on a bus". The extant manuscripts tell a different story: Jack in the Box was found in a single sketchbook, while Geneviève was composed on eight loose sheets torn out of a different book. It was also determined that the story of the bus related only to Jack in the Box, which Satie had copyrighted with SACEM in 1905.

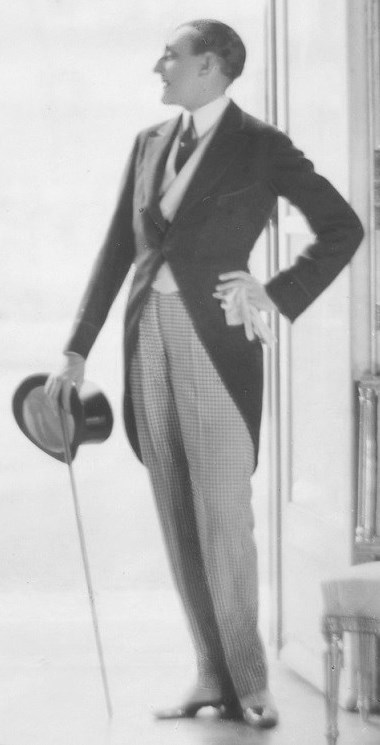
Count Etienne de Beaumont

Enter Count Etienne de Beaumont (1883-1956), Satie's most devoted patron of the 1920s. In early 1926 he began organizing a one-day "Satie Festival" to honor the composer's memory and raise funds for a monument over his unmarked grave in Arcueil. For the finale it was Beaumont's idea to stage the newly unearthed Geneviève as a lavish puppet show. He had seen Manuel de Falla's El retablo de maese Pedro (1923) at the private salon of Princesse Edmond de Polignac, and commissioned the same artist, Spanish painter Manuel Angelès Ortiz (1895-1984), to design the sets and marionettes. Désormière was named the event's music director and set about orchestrating the score.

On May 17, 1926, the 60th anniversary of Satie's birth, the premiere of Geneviève capped off the Satie Festival at the Théâtre des Champs-Élysées. The roles of Geneviève and Golo were sung by mezzo-soprano Jane Bathori and baritone Roger Bourdin; the marionettes were operated by Les Waltons, a famed group of French puppeteers. According to Volta, "This performance was such a great success that any other means of presenting Geneviève de Brabant became unthinkable - to the point that this work of Erik Satie has been classified in all catalogues as an 'opera for marionettes' ever since".

Contamine de Latour was still living but too ill to attend the concert; he died a week later at 59, the same age as Satie. In August 1925 he had paid a personal tribute with three articles entitled "My Close Friend Erik Satie: Memories of Youth", published in the Paris daily Comœdia. Though sometimes hazy in facts and chronology, these pieces have proved a valuable resource for Satie researchers with their vivid portrayals of his early adulthood. For all his prolific efforts as an author and journalist, Contamine de Latour's claim to fame rests on his personal and professional connection to Satie.

The strangest twist in Geneviève's premiere was the complete disregard for Contamine de Latour's contributions. Apart from the sung verses, for which he was uncredited, none of his play was used; his name did not appear in the show's program or publicity material. Contemporary press releases claimed, "Having written it for puppets, Erik Satie had not concerned himself with the text", and billed Geneviève as set to "poems by Lucien Daudet". Nearly 50 years later Ornella Volta discovered the intact libretto in Count Beaumont's archives, and eventually secured its publication. If Beaumont had the playscript while he was planning the festival, it is not known why he chose to suppress it. Its absence created problems in forming some sort of cohesive narrative out of the free-standing musical numbers, so Lucien Daudet was brought in to write three short explanatory poems to be read before each act. At the premiere this was done by actor Edouard Ferras.

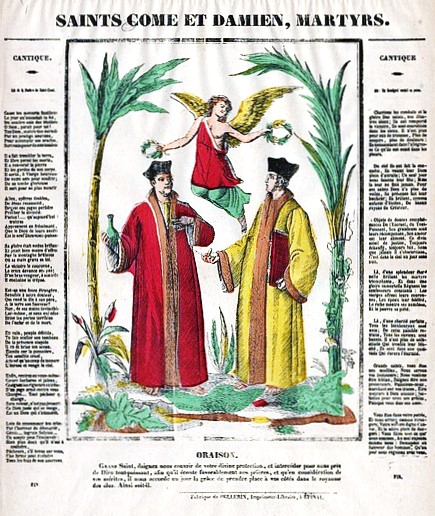
A 19th Century Épinal print, with Canticles

The text issues were compounded after Universal Edition of Vienna published the piano and orchestral versions in 1930. Not having the original libretto at their disposal, the editors prefaced the scores with an old French Épinal print featuring an anonymous Canticle in honor of Geneviève. Many of these popular prints had been distributed during the 19th Century, to be sung to the tune of "Due devant nous tout s'abaisse et tout tremble" ("Before us everything sinks and everything trembles") from Jean-Baptiste Lully's tragic opera Atys (1675). These verses stick to the traditional legend with its lachrymose denouement (even the doe dies from heartbreak), completely at odds with the authors' intentions and the lyrics of the arias. In later editions Universal gave Contamine de Latour sole credit for the texts, leading commentators to assume he also wrote the Canticle and Daudet's poems. The Canticle itself is now almost always spoken before every performance.

Ironically, one of Contamine de Latour's jokes in the play was having Count Sifroy order thousands of Épinal prints with Geneviève's image "for the delight of future generations".

The restored Satie-"Lord Cheminot" version of Geneviève de Brabant was first performed in 1983 by the puppet theater troupe Monti-Colla of Milan at La Fenice in Venice, in an Italian translation by Ornella Volta. Universal published the French text as addenda to the piano and orchestral scores (1986, 1989).

== Recordings ==
- Rénée Bertemes-Roeder (soprano), Alphonse Kontz (baritone), Orchestre Symphonique De Radio-Tele Luxembourg and Chorale "Uelzecht" d'Esch-sur-Alzette, conducted by Roland Douatte. Musidisc-Europe, 1970.
- Mady Mesplé (soprano), Jean-Christophe Benoit (baritone), Orchestre de Paris and Choeur National de L'Opéra de Paris, conducted by Pierre Dervaux. Arabesque, 1974.
- Jane Manning (soprano), Bojan Gorišek (piano), Audiophile Classics, 1995.
- Mariella Devia (soprano), Davide Bassino (baritone), Corallina De Maria, Fausta Truffa, Mauro Ginestrone (chorus), Andrea Tedesco (piano). Italian recording with text translated by Ornella Volta. New Tone Records, 1996.
