= Erik Satie =

French composer and pianist (1866–1925)

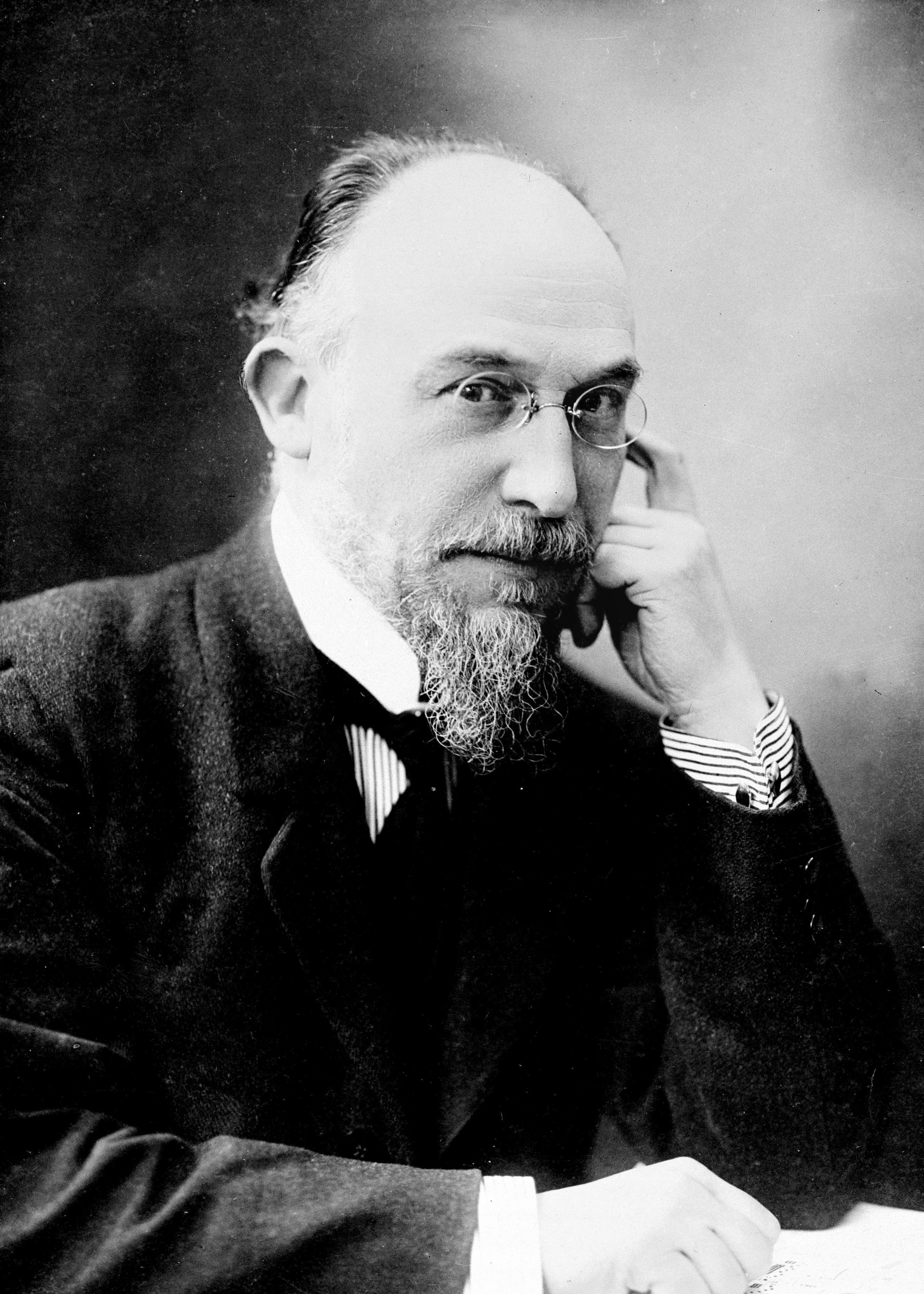
- Satie in 1920
- Born: Eric Alfred Leslie Satie; 17 May 1866; Honfleur, France
- Died: 1 July 1925 (aged 59); Paris, France
- Occupations: Composer; pianist
- Works: List of compositions

Eric Alfred Leslie Satie (Note: UK: /ˈsæti, ˈsɑːti/, US: /sæˈtiː, sɑːˈtiː/; French: [eʁik sati]; also sometimes spelt as Éric.) (17 May 1866 – 1 July 1925), better known as Erik Satie, was a French composer and pianist. The son of a French father and a British mother, he studied at the Paris Conservatoire but was undistinguished and did not obtain a diploma. In the 1880s he worked as a pianist in café-cabarets in Montmartre, Paris, and began composing works, mostly for solo piano, such as his Gymnopédies and Gnossiennes. He also wrote music for a Rosicrucian sect to which he was briefly attached.

Following a period of sparse compositional productivity, Satie entered Paris's second music academy, the Schola Cantorum, as a mature student. His studies there were more successful than those at the Conservatoire. From about 1910 he became the focus of successive groups of young composers attracted by his unconventionality and originality. Among them were the group known as Les Six. A meeting with Jean Cocteau in 1915 led to the creation of the ballet Parade (1917) for Sergei Diaghilev, with music by Satie, sets and costumes by Pablo Picasso, and choreography by Léonide Massine.

Satie's example guided a new generation of French composers away from post-Wagnerian Impressionism towards a sparer, terser style. During his lifetime, he influenced Maurice Ravel, Claude Debussy, and Francis Poulenc, and he is seen as an influence on more recent composers such as John Cage and John Adams. His harmony is often characterised by unresolved chords; he sometimes dispensed with bar-lines, as in his Gnossiennes; and his melodies are generally simple and often reflect his love of old church music. He gave some of his later works absurd titles, such as Véritables Préludes flasques (pour un chien) ("True Flabby Preludes (for a Dog)", 1912), Croquis et agaceries d'un gros bonhomme en bois ("Sketches and Exasperations of a Big Wooden Man", 1913) and Sonatine bureaucratique ("Bureaucratic Sonatina", 1917). Most of his works are brief, and the majority are for solo piano. Exceptions include his "symphonic drama" Socrate (1919) and two late ballets Mercure and Relâche (1924).

Satie never married, and his home for most of his adult life was a single small room, first in Montmartre and, from 1898 to his death, in Arcueil, a suburb of Paris. He adopted various images over the years, including a period in quasi-priestly dress, another in which he always wore identically coloured velvet suits, and is known for his last persona, in neat bourgeois costume, with bowler hat, wing collar, and umbrella. He was a lifelong heavy drinker, and died of cirrhosis of the liver at the age of 59.

== Life and career ==
=== Early years ===
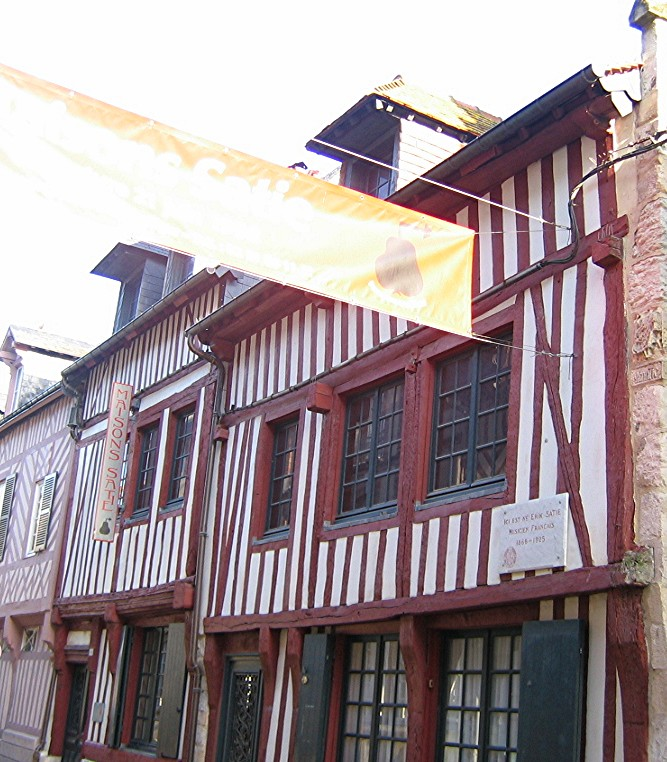
Satie's birthplace and childhood home in Honfleur, Normandy, now a museum

Satie was born on 17 May 1866 in Honfleur, Normandy, the first child of Alfred Satie and his wife Jane Leslie (née Anton). Jane Satie was an English Protestant of Scottish descent; Alfred Satie, a shipping broker, was a Roman Catholic. A year later, the Saties had a daughter, Olga, and in 1869 a second son, Conrad. The children were baptised in the Anglican church.

After the Franco-Prussian War Alfred Satie sold his business and the family moved to Paris, where he set up as a music publisher. In 1872 Jane Satie died and Eric and his brother were sent back to Honfleur to be brought up by Alfred's parents. The boys were rebaptised as Roman Catholics and educated at a local boarding school, where Satie excelled in history and Latin but nothing else. In 1874 he began taking music lessons with a local organist, Gustave Vinot, a former pupil of Louis Niedermeyer. Vinot stimulated Satie's love of old church music, and in particular Gregorian chant.

In 1878 Satie's grandmother died, (Note: Her death was mysterious: she was found drowned on the beach at Honfleur in unexplained circumstances.) and the two boys returned to Paris to be informally educated by their father. Satie did not attend a school, but his father took him to lectures at the Collège de France and engaged a tutor to teach Eric Latin and Greek. Before the boys returned to Paris from Honfleur, Alfred had met a piano teacher and salon composer, Eugénie Barnetche, whom he married in January 1879, to the dismay of the twelve-year-old Satie, who did not like her.

Eugénie Satie resolved that her elder stepson should become a professional musician, and in November 1879 enrolled him in the preparatory piano class at the Paris Conservatoire. Satie strongly disliked the institution, which he described as "a vast, very uncomfortable, and rather ugly building; a sort of district prison with no beauty on the inside – nor on the outside, for that matter". (Note: "un vaste bâtiment très inconfortable et assez vilain à voir – une sorte de local pénitencier sans aucun agrément extérieur – ni intérieur du reste".) He studied solfeggio with Albert Lavignac and piano with Émile Decombes, who had been a pupil of Frédéric Chopin. In 1880 Satie took his first examinations as a pianist: he was described as "gifted but indolent". The following year Decombes called him "the laziest student in the Conservatoire". In 1882 he was expelled from the Conservatoire for his unsatisfactory performance.

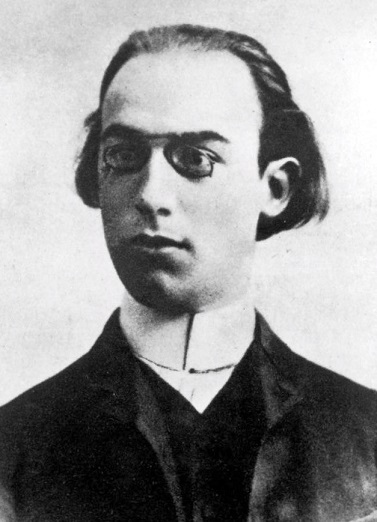
Satie in 1884

In 1884 Satie wrote his first known composition, a short Allegro for piano, composed while on holiday in Honfleur. He signed himself "Erik" on this and subsequent compositions, though he continued to use "Eric" on other documents until 1906. In 1885, he was readmitted to the Conservatoire, in the intermediate piano class of his stepmother's former teacher, Georges Mathias. He made little progress: Mathias described his playing as "insignificant and laborious" and Satie himself as "worthless. Three months just to learn the piece. Cannot sight-read properly." (Note: Satie's biographer Robert Orledge has conjectured that Satie had dyslexia, a condition that can make reading music as difficult as reading words.) Satie became fascinated by aspects of religion. He spent much time in Notre-Dame de Paris contemplating the stained glass windows and in the National Library examining obscure medieval manuscripts. His friend Alphonse Allais later dubbed him "Esotérik Satie". From this period comes Ogives, a set of four piano pieces inspired by Gregorian chant and Gothic church architecture.

Keen to leave the Conservatoire, Satie volunteered for military service and joined the 33rd Infantry Regiment in November 1886. He found army life no more to his liking than the Conservatoire, and deliberately contracted acute bronchitis by standing in the open, bare-chested, on a winter night. After three months' convalescence, he was invalided out of the army.

=== Montmartre ===
In 1887, at the age of 21, Satie moved from his father's residence to lodgings in the 9th arrondissement. By this time he had started what was to be an enduring friendship with the romantic poet Contamine de Latour, whose verse he set in some of his early compositions, which Satie senior published. His lodgings were close to the popular Chat Noir cabaret on the southern edge of Montmartre where he became an habitué and then a resident pianist. The Chat Noir was known as the "temple de la 'convention farfelue'" – the temple of zany convention, and, as the biographer Robert Orledge puts it, Satie, "free from his restrictive upbringing … enthusiastically embraced the reckless bohemian lifestyle and created for himself a new persona as a long-haired man-about-town in frock coat and top hat". This was the first of several personas that Satie adopted over the years.

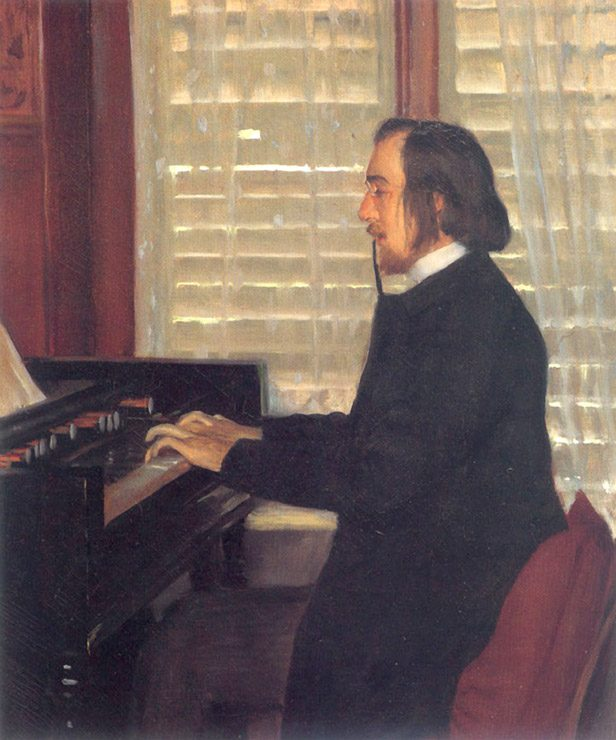
Satie by Santiago Rusiñol, 1890s

In the late 1880s Satie styled himself on at least one occasion "Erik Satie – gymnopédiste", (Note: Later he referred to himself at least once as a "phonometrician" (meaning "someone who measures sounds") after being called "a clumsy but subtle technician" in a book about contemporary French composers published in 1911.) and his works from this period include the three Gymnopédies (1888) and the first Gnossiennes (1889 and 1890). He earned a modest living as a pianist and conductor at the Chat Noir, before falling out with the proprietor and moving to become second pianist at the nearby Auberge du Clou. There he became a close friend of Claude Debussy, who proved a kindred spirit in his experimental approach to composition. Both were bohemians, enjoying the same café society and struggling to survive financially. At the Auberge du Clou Satie first encountered the flamboyant, self-styled "Sâr" Joséphin Péladan, for whose mystic sect, the Ordre de la Rose-Croix Catholique du Temple et du Graal, he was appointed composer. This gave him scope for experiment, and Péladan's salons at the fashionable Galerie Durand-Ruel gained Satie his first public hearings. Frequently short of money, Satie moved from his lodgings in the 9th arrondissement to a small room in the rue Cortot not far from Sacre-Coeur, so high up the Butte Montmartre that he said he could see from his window all the way to the Belgian border. (Note: "La vu s'étend jusqu'à la frontière belge".)

By mid-1892 Satie had composed the first pieces in a compositional system of his own making (Fête donnée par des Chevaliers Normands en l'honneur d'une jeune demoiselle), provided incidental music to a chivalric esoteric play (two Préludes du Nazaréen), had a hoax published (announcing the premiere of his non-existent Le bâtard de Tristan, an anti-Wagnerian opera), and broken away from Péladan, starting with the "Uspud" project, a "Christian Ballet", in collaboration with Latour. He challenged the musical establishment by proposing himself – unsuccessfully – for the seat in the Académie des Beaux-Arts made vacant by the death of Ernest Guiraud. (Note: Satie repeated this gesture twice – on the deaths of Charles Gounod in 1894 and Ambroise Thomas in 1896. Professors from the Conservatoire were elected on both occasions.) Between 1893 and 1895, Satie, wearing quasi-priestly dress, was the founder and only member of the Eglise Métropolitaine d'Art de Jésus Conducteur. From his "Abbatiale" in the rue Cortot, he published scathing attacks on his artistic enemies.

Suzanne Valadon, 1885

In 1893 Satie had what is believed to be his only love affair, a five-month liaison with the painter Suzanne Valadon. After their first night together, he proposed marriage. They did not marry, but Valadon moved to a room next to Satie's at the rue Cortot. Satie became obsessed with her, calling her his Biqui and writing impassioned notes about "her whole being, lovely eyes, gentle hands, and tiny feet". During their relationship Satie composed the Danses gothiques as a means of calming his mind, and Valadon painted his portrait, which she gave him. After five months she moved away, leaving him devastated. He said later that he was left with "nothing but an icy loneliness that fills the head with emptiness and the heart with sadness".

In 1895 Satie changed his image once again, this time to that of "the Velvet Gentleman". From the proceeds of a small legacy, he bought seven identical dun-coloured suits. Orledge comments that this change "marked the end of his Rose+Croix period and the start of a long search for a new artistic direction".

=== Move to Arcueil ===
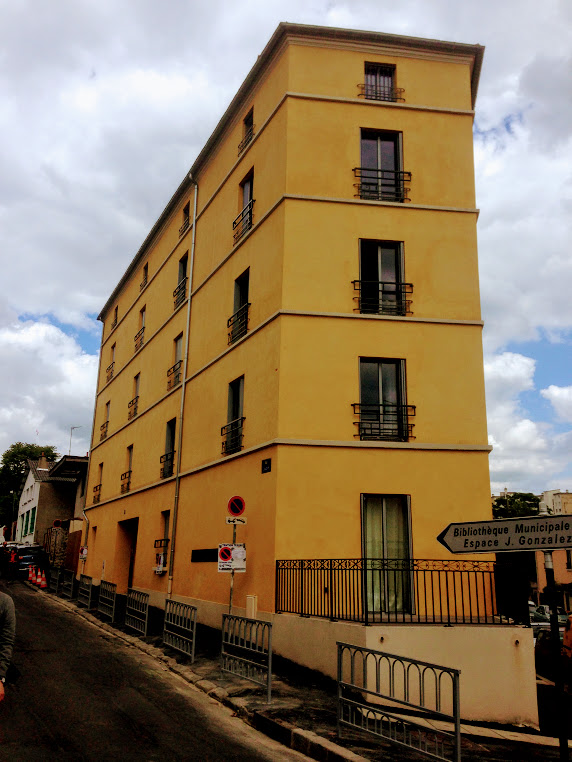
"Les quatre cheminées", Arcueil – Satie's home from 1898 to his death

In 1898, in search of somewhere cheaper and quieter than Montmartre, Satie moved to a room in the southern suburbs, in the commune of Arcueil-Cachan, eight kilometres (five miles) from the centre of Paris. This remained his home for the rest of his life. No visitors were ever admitted. He joined the Socialist Party after the assassination of Jean Jaurès; he later switched his membership to the Communist Party after its founding, but adopted a thoroughly bourgeois image: his first biographer Pierre-Daniel Templier writes, "With his umbrella and bowler hat, he resembled a quiet school teacher. Although a Bohemian, he looked very dignified, almost ceremonious".

Satie earned a living as a cabaret pianist, adapting more than a hundred compositions of popular music for piano or piano and voice, adding some of his own. The most popular of these were Je te veux, text by Henry Pacory; Tendrement, text by Vincent Hyspa; Poudre d'or, a waltz; La Diva de l'Empire, text by Dominique Bonnaud/Numa Blès; Le Picadilly, a march; Légende californienne, text by Contamine de Latour (lost, but the music later reappears in La belle excentrique); and others. Between 1898 and 1908, he composed and arranged the music for around thirty Hyspa texts. These songs, which caricatured current political events, enabled Satie to explore the use of quotations for humorous purposes that characterises his work. In his later years Satie rejected all his cabaret music as vile and against his nature. Only a few compositions that he took seriously remain from this period: Jack in the Box, music to a pantomime by Jules Depaquit (called a "clownerie" by Satie); Geneviève de Brabant, a short comic opera to a text by "Lord Cheminot" (Latour); Le poisson rêveur (The Dreamy Fish), piano music to accompany a lost tale by Cheminot, and a few others that were mostly incomplete. Few were presented, and none published at the time.

Musical friends and teachers: from top left clockwise – Claude Debussy, Vincent d'Indy, Albert Roussel, Maurice Ravel

A decisive change in Satie's musical outlook came after he heard the premiere of Debussy's opera Pelléas et Mélisande in 1902. He found it "absolutely astounding", and he re-evaluated his own music. In a determined attempt to improve his technique, and against Debussy's advice, he enrolled as a mature student at Paris's second main music academy, the Schola Cantorum in October 1905, continuing his studies there until 1912. The institution was run by Vincent d'Indy, who emphasised orthodox technique rather than creative originality. Satie studied counterpoint with Albert Roussel and composition with d'Indy, and was a much more conscientious and successful student than he had been at the Conservatoire in his youth.

In 1911, when he was in his mid-forties, Satie came to the notice of the musical public in general. That January Maurice Ravel played some early Satie works at a concert by the Société musicale indépendante, a forward-looking group set up by Ravel and others as a rival to the conservative Société nationale de musique. (Note: The pieces were the second Sarabande, the first prelude to Le Fils des étoiles and the third of the Gymnopédies.) Satie was suddenly seen as "the precursor and apostle of the musical revolution now taking place"; he became a focus for young composers. Debussy, having orchestrated the first and third Gymnopédies, conducted them in concert. The publisher Demets asked for new works from Satie, who was finally able to give up his cabaret work and devote himself to composition. Works such as the cycle Sports et divertissements (1914) were published in de luxe editions. The press began to write about Satie's music, and a leading pianist, Ricardo Viñes, took him up, giving celebrated first performances of some Satie pieces.

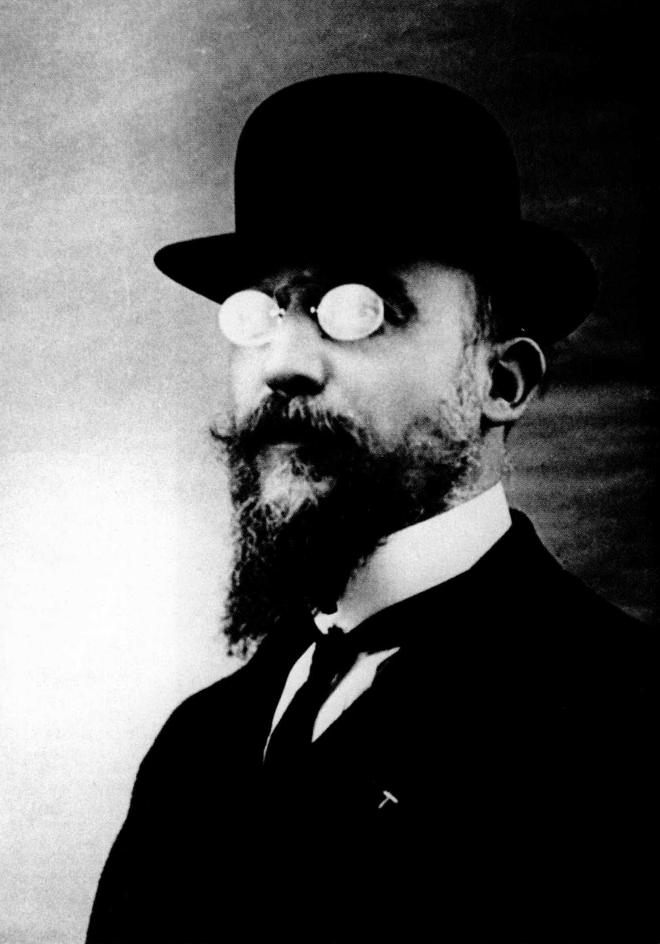
Satie's final persona, bowler-hatted and formally dressed

=== Last years ===
Satie became the focus of successive groups of young composers, who he first encouraged and then distanced himself from, sometimes rancorously, when their popularity threatened to eclipse his or they otherwise displeased him. First were the "jeunes" – those associated with Ravel – and then a group known at first as the "nouveaux jeunes", later called Les Six, including Georges Auric, Louis Durey, Arthur Honegger, and Germaine Tailleferre, joined later by Francis Poulenc and Darius Milhaud. Satie dissociated himself from the second group in 1918, and in the 1920s became the focal point of another set of young composers including Henri Cliquet-Pleyel, Roger Désormière, Maxime Jacob and Henri Sauguet, who became known as the "Arcueil School". As well as turning against Ravel, Auric and Poulenc in particular, Satie quarrelled with his old friend Debussy in 1917, resentful of the latter's failure to appreciate his recent compositions. The rupture lasted for the remaining months of Debussy's life, and when he died the following year, Satie refused to attend the funeral. A few of his protégés escaped his displeasure, and Milhaud and Désormière were among those who remained friends with him to the last.

Parade, 1917 – music by Satie, décor by Pablo Picasso

The First World War restricted concert-giving to some extent, but Orledge comments that the war years brought "Satie's second lucky break", when Jean Cocteau heard Viñes and Satie perform the Trois morceaux in 1916. This led to the commissioning of the ballet Parade, premiered in 1917 by Sergei Diaghilev's Ballets Russes, with music by Satie, sets and costumes by Pablo Picasso, and choreography by Léonide Massine. This was a succès de scandale, with jazz rhythms and instrumentation including parts for typewriter, steamship whistle and siren. It firmly established Satie's name before the public, and thereafter his career centred on the theatre, writing mainly to commission.

In October 1916, Satie received a commission from the Princesse de Polignac, Winnaretta Singer, funding what Orledge considers the composer's masterpiece, the symphonic drama Socrate (1917–1918). A chamber oratorio, it is a musical setting of excerpts from Plato's Socratic dialogues in a lyrical translation by Victor Cousin's, an eclecticist philosopher and populiser of Hegel. Composition was interrupted in 1917 by the music critic Jean Poueigh's libel suit and the threat of jail. Satie called Socrate "a return to classical simplicity with a modern sensibility" at its premiere. Igor Stravinsky, whom Satie admired, praised the work.

In his later years Satie was in demand as a journalist, making contributions to the Revue musicale, Action, L'Esprit nouveau, the Paris-Journal and other publications from the Dadaist 391 to the English-language magazines Vanity Fair and The Transatlantic Review. As he contributed anonymously or under pen names to some publications it is not certain how many titles he wrote for, but Grove Dictionary of Music and Musicians lists 25. Satie's habit of embellishing the scores of his compositions with all kinds of written remarks became so established that he had to insist that they must not be read out during performances. (Note: He wrote in the first edition of Heures séculaires et instantanées, I forbid anyone to read the text aloud during the musical performance. Ignorance of my instructions will incur my righteous indignation against the presumptuous culprit. No exception will be allowed".)

In 1920 there was a festival of Satie's music at the Salle Érard in Paris. In 1924 the ballets Mercure, with choreography by Massine and décor by Picasso, and Relâche ("Cancelled"), in collaboration with Francis Picabia and René Clair, both provoked headlines with their first night scandals. Satie's music for the latter is a comedic bricolage of high art and popular music from the cabaret, one of its many playful "cancellations". Auric called it "a miserable pastiche", but Satie christened it "obscène" and touted it as "pornographic", writing in the concert programme:

The music for Relâche? I was portraying people "out on a spree". Using popular themes for the purpose. These themes were powerfully "evocative". ... "Faint-hearts"—and other "moralists"—will reproach me for making use of these .... There is only one judge I defer to: the public. It will recognize these themes and will not be shocked in the least to hear them. ... Aren't they "human", after all? ... Let anyone who dreads such "evocations" retire.

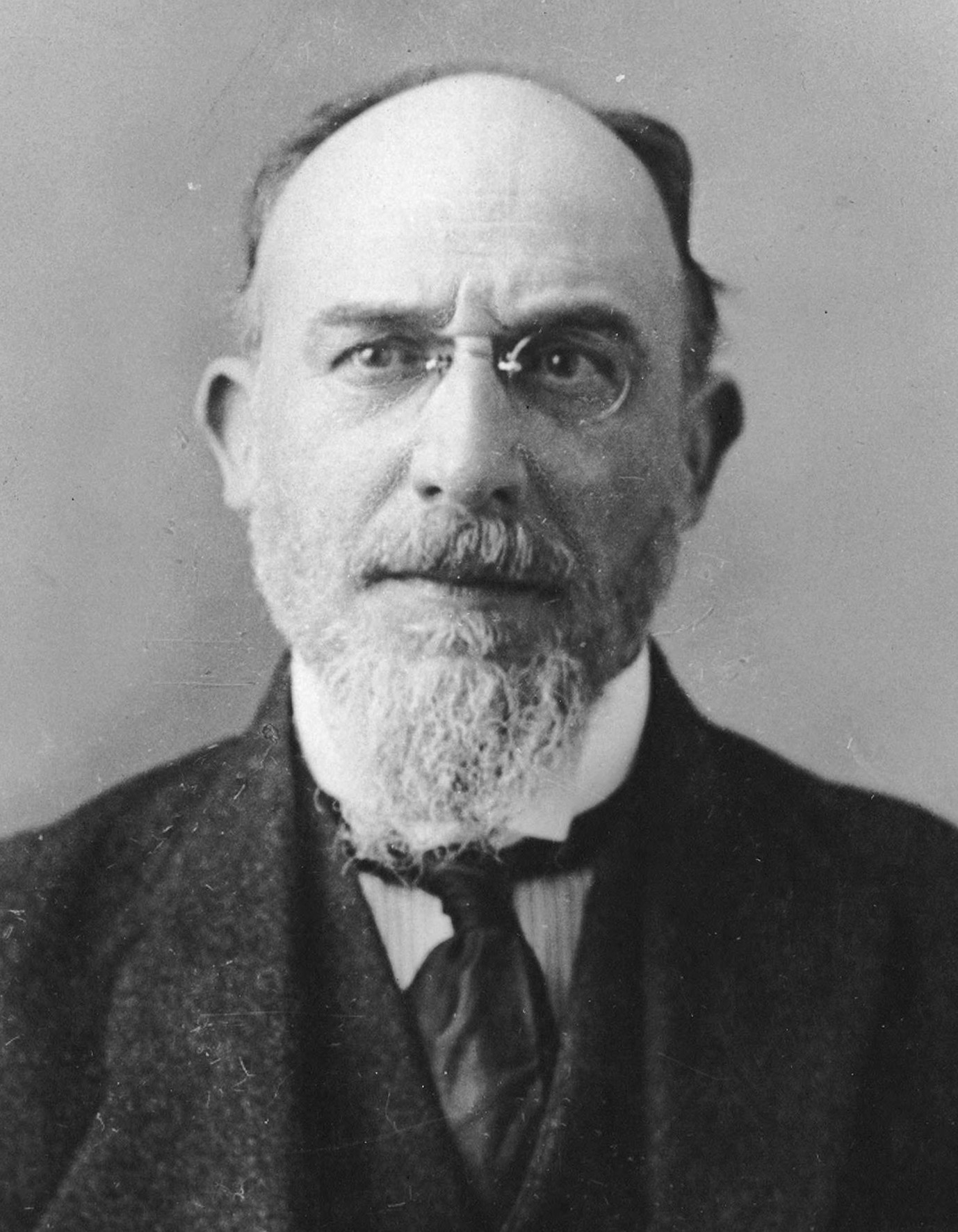
Satie (ca. 1919)

Despite being a musical iconoclast, and encourager of modernism, Satie was uninterested to the point of antipathy in innovations such as the telephone, the gramophone and the radio. He made no recordings, and as far as is known heard only a single radio broadcast (of Milhaud's music) and made only one telephone call. Although his personal appearance was immaculate, his room at Arcueil, according to Orledge, was "squalid", and after his death the scores of several important works believed lost were found among the accumulated rubbish. He was incompetent with money. Having depended to a considerable extent on the generosity of friends in his early years, he was little better off when he began to earn a good income from his compositions, as he spent or gave away money as soon as he received it. He liked children, and they liked him, but his relations with adults were seldom straightforward. One of his last collaborators, Picabia, said of him:

Satie's case is extraordinary. He's a mischievous and cunning old artist. At least, that's how he thinks of himself. Myself, I think the opposite! He's a very susceptible man, arrogant, a real sad child, but one who is sometimes made optimistic by alcohol. But he's a good friend, and I like him a lot.

Throughout his adult life Satie was a heavy drinker, and in 1925 his health collapsed. He was taken to the Hôpital Saint-Joseph in Paris, diagnosed with cirrhosis of the liver. He died there at 8:00 p.m. on 1 July, at the age of 59. He was buried in the cemetery at Arcueil.

== Works ==
=== Music ===
In the view of the Oxford Dictionary of Music, Satie's importance lay in "directing a new generation of French composers away from Wagner‐influenced Impressionism towards a leaner, more epigrammatic style". Debussy christened him "the precursor" because of his early harmonic innovations. Satie summed up his musical philosophy in 1917:

To have a feeling for harmony is to have a feeling for tonality… the melody is the Idea, the outline; as much as it is the form and the subject matter of a work. The harmony is an illumination, an exhibition of the object, its reflection.

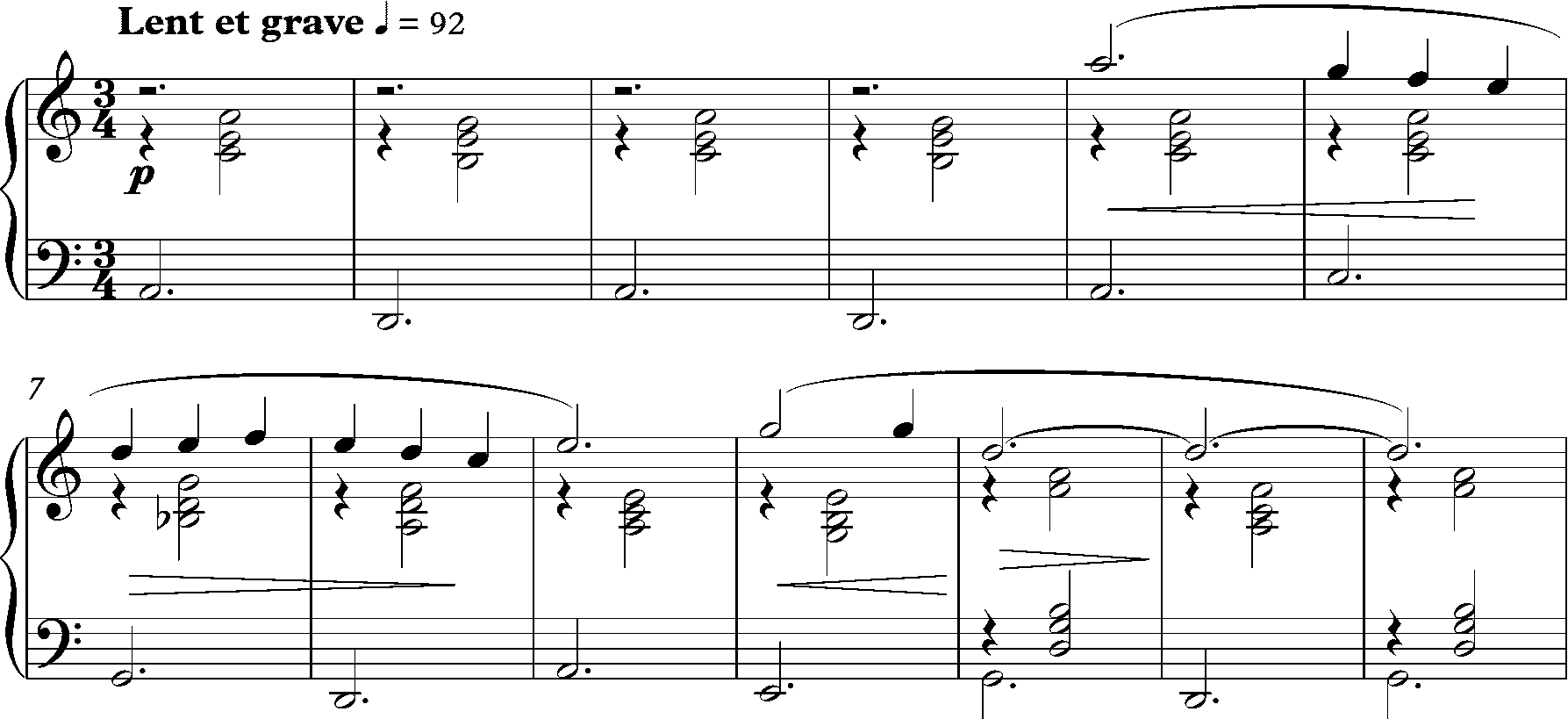
Gymnopédie No. 3

Among his earliest compositions were sets of three Gymnopédies (1888) and his Gnossiennes (1889 onwards) for piano. They evoke the ancient world by what the critics Roger Nichols and Paul Griffiths describe as "pure simplicity, monotonous repetition, and highly original modal harmonies". It is possible that their simplicity and originality were influenced by Debussy; it is also possible that it was Satie who influenced Debussy. During the brief spell when Satie was composer to Péladan's sect he adopted a similarly austere manner.

While Satie was earning his living as a café pianist in Montmartre he contributed songs and little waltzes. After moving to Arcueil he began to write works with quirky titles, such as the seven-movement suite Trois morceaux en forme de poire ("Three Pear-shaped Pieces") for piano four-hands (1903), simply phrased music that Nichols and Griffiths describe as "a résumé of his music since 1890" – reusing some of his earlier work as well as popular songs of the time. He struggled to find his own musical voice. Orledge writes that this was partly because of his "trying to ape his illustrious peers … we find bits of Ravel in his miniature opera Geneviève de Brabant and echoes of both Fauré and Debussy in the Nouvelles pièces froides of 1907".

After concluding his studies at the Schola Cantorum in 1912 Satie composed with greater confidence and more prolifically. Orchestration, despite his studies with d'Indy, was never his strongest suit, but his grasp of counterpoint is evident in the opening bars of Parade, and from the outset of his composing career he had original and distinctive ideas about harmony. In his later years he composed sets of short instrumental works with absurd titles, including Véritables Préludes flasques (pour un chien) ("True Flabby Preludes (for a Dog)", 1912), Croquis et agaceries d'un gros bonhomme en bois ("Sketches and Exasperations of a Big Wooden Man", 1913) and Sonatine bureaucratique ("Bureaucratic Sonata", 1917).

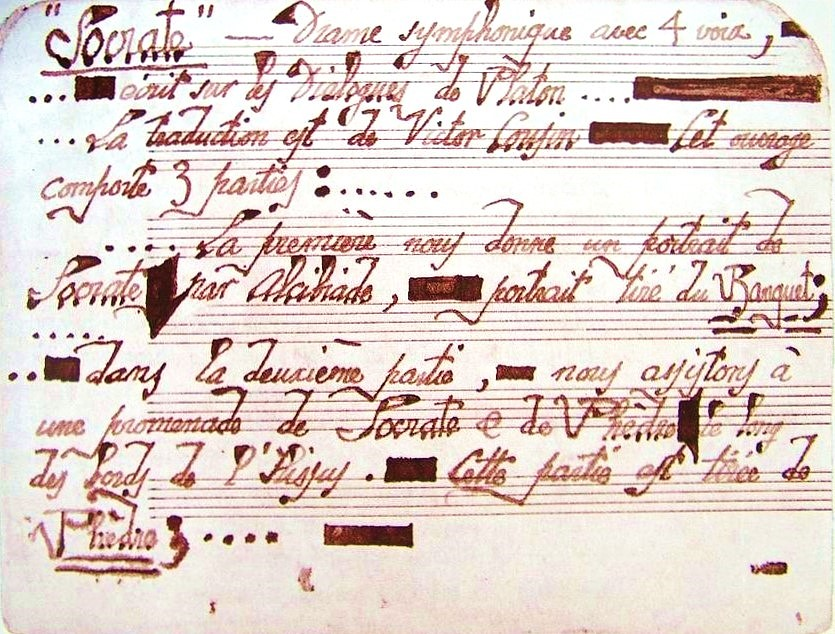
Manuscript of Socrate

In his neat, calligraphic hand, Satie would write extensive instructions for his performers, and although his words appear at first sight to be humorous and deliberately nonsensical, Nichols and Griffiths comment, "a sensitive pianist can make much of injunctions such as 'arm yourself with clairvoyance' and 'with the end of your thought'". His Sonatine bureaucratique anticipates the neoclassicism soon adopted by Stravinsky. Despite his rancorous falling out with Debussy, Satie commemorated his long-time friend in 1920, two years after Debussy's death, in the anguished "Elégie", the first of the miniature song cycle Quatre petites mélodies. Orledge rates the cycle as the finest, though least known, of the four sets of short songs of Satie's last decade.

Satie coined the term musique d'ameublement ("furniture music") and developed the concept as background music for easy listening. He composed Cinéma, an early example of film music, for René Clair's Entr'acte (the entr'acte for Relâche). This music was meant to support mood, not demand focused attention, an approach that echoed surrealism's appeal to the unconscious mind. René Magritte admired Satie's music and aesthetic. He and E. L. T. Mesens appeared on the playbill for Relâche.

Satie is regarded by some writers as an influence on minimalism, which developed in the 1960s and later. The musicologist Mark Bennett and the composer Humphrey Searle have said that John Cage's music shows Satie's influence, and Searle and the writer Edward Strickland have used the term "minimalism" in connection with Satie's Vexations, which the composer implied in his manuscript should be played over and over again 840 times. John Adams included a specific homage to Satie's music in his 1996 Century Rolls.

=== Writings ===
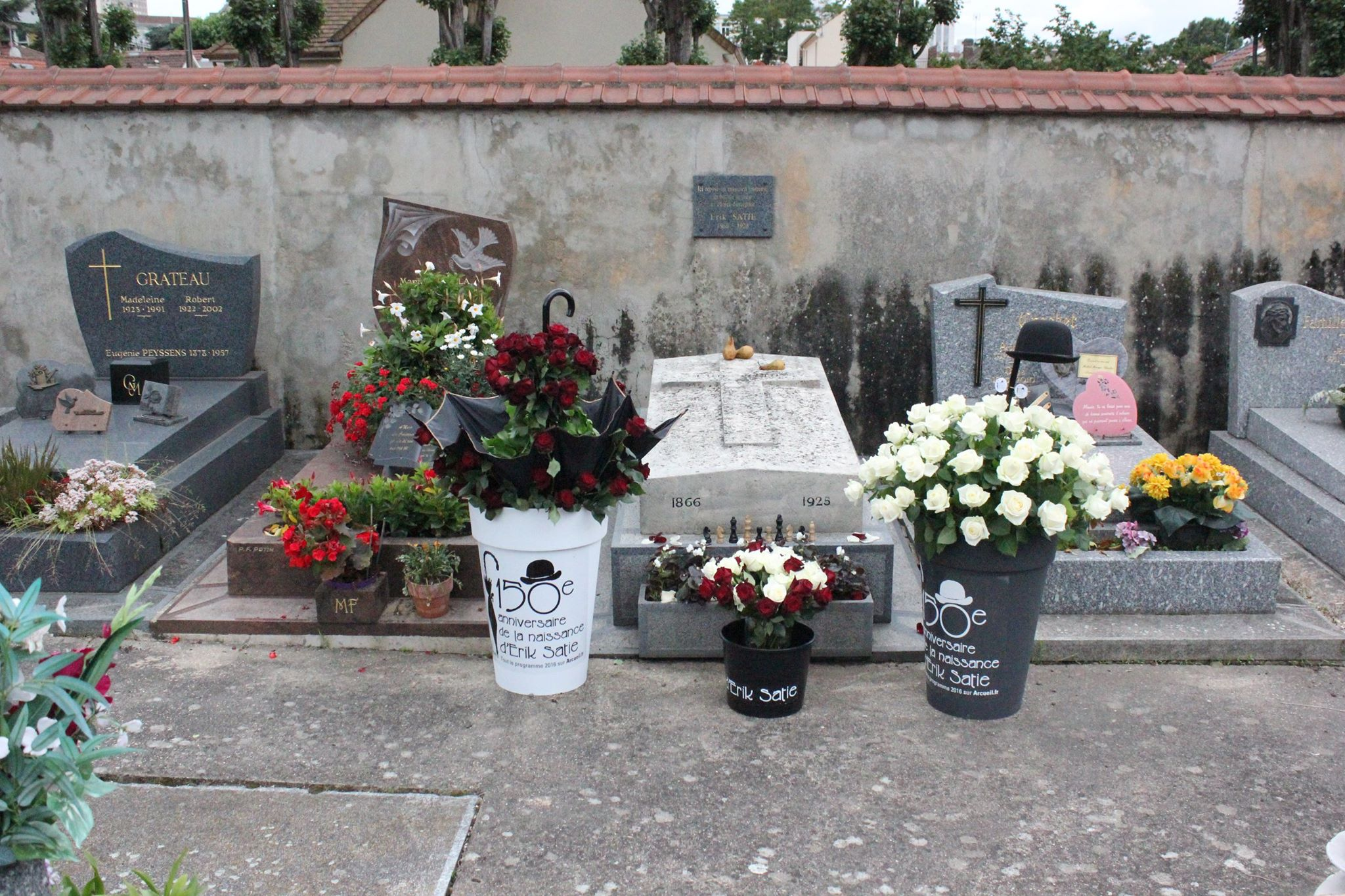
Satie's grave bearing a white cross in Arcueil, to the south of Paris

Satie wrote extensively for the press, but unlike his professional colleagues such as Debussy and Dukas he did not write primarily as a music critic. Much of his writing is connected to music tangentially if at all. His biographer Caroline Potter describes him as "an experimental creative writer, a blagueur (Note: A blagueur is "a joker or prankster" according to the Merriam-Webster French-English dictionary.) who provoked, mystified and amused his readers". He wrote jeux d'esprit claiming to eat dinner in four minutes with a diet of exclusively white food (including bones and fruit mould), or to drink boiled wine mixed with fuchsia juice, or to be woken by a servant hourly throughout the night to have his temperature taken; he wrote in praise of Beethoven's non-existent but "sumptuous" Tenth Symphony, and the family of instruments known as the cephalophones, "which have a compass of thirty octaves and are absolutely unplayable".

Satie grouped some of these writings under the general headings Cahiers d'un mammifère (A Mammal's Notebook) and Mémoires d'un amnésique (Memoirs of an Amnesiac), indicating, as Potter comments, that "these are not autobiographical writings in the conventional manner". He claimed the major influence on his humour was Oliver Cromwell, adding "I also owe much to Christopher Columbus, because the American spirit has occasionally tapped me on the shoulder and I have been delighted to feel its ironically glacial bite".

His published writings include:

- A Mammal's Notebook: Collected Writings of Erik Satie (Serpent's Tail; Atlas Arkhive, No 5, 1997) ISBN 0-947757-92-9 (with introduction and notes by Ornella Volta, translations by Anthony Melville, contains several drawings by Satie)
- Correspondence presque complète: Réunie, établie et présentée par Ornella Volta (Paris: Fayard/Imes, 2000) ISBN 2-213-60674-9 (an almost complete edition of Satie's letters, in French)
- Nigel Wilkins, The Writings of Erik Satie, London, 1980.

== Legacy ==
The first biography of Satie was published in Paris in 1932 (though not translated into English until 1969). The author, Pierre-Daniel Templier, consulted with Conrad Satie, the composer's brother, who also supplied documents and old family photographs for illustrations. It remains historically significant, and subsequent biographies have all used it as a source. Rollo Myers, a long-time English music critic based in Paris, produced the first English language study in 1948, paying more attention to an analysis of the music - though before that the composer Constant Lambert had included a significant chapter on Satie in his landmark study of contemporary music Music Ho! (1934).

The centenary of Satie's death was commemorated by the BBC which made him their composer of the week and broadcast a special Satie-Day Morning programme. A digital album called Satie: Discoveries was premiered. It included 27 previously unpublished works that had been researched by James Nye and Sato Matsui and performed on the piano by Alexandre Tharaud.

== Notes, references and sources ==
=== Sources ===
- Allmer, Patricia (2019). René Magritte. Reaktion. ISBN 978-1-78914-180-1.
- Baker, George (2007). "Dada Cinema". The Artwork Caught by the Tail: Francis Picabia and Dada in Paris. MIT Press. ISBN 978-0-262-02618-5.
- Bennett, Mark (1995). A Brief History of Minimalism. Ann Arbor: UMI. OCLC 964203894.
- Dickinson, Peter (2016). Words and Music. Woodbridge: Boydell Press. ISBN 978-1-78327-106-1.
- Dietschy, Marcel (1999). A Portrait of Claude Debussy. Oxford: Clarendon. ISBN 978-0-19-315469-8.
- Duchen, Jessica (2000). Gabriel Fauré. London: Phaidon. ISBN 978-0-7148-3932-5.
- Gillmor, Alan M. (1988). Erik Satie. Boston: Twayne. ISBN 978-0-8057-9472-4.
- Harding, James (1975). Erik Satie. London: Secker & Warburg. OCLC 251432509.
- Innes, Christopher; Maria Shevtsova (2013). The Cambridge Introduction to Theatre Directing. Cambridge and New York: Cambridge University Press. ISBN 978-0-521-84449-9.
- Kelly, Barbara L. (2000). "History and Homage". In Deborah Mawer (ed.). The Cambridge Companion to Ravel. Cambridge: Cambridge University Press. ISBN 978-0-52-164856-1.
- Lajoinie, Vincent (1985). Erik Satie (in French). Lausanne: Age d'homme. OCLC 417094292.
- Lesure, François (2019). Claude Debussy: A Critical Biography. Rochester, NY: University of Rochester Press. ISBN 978-1-58046-903-6.
- Myers, Rollo (1948). Erik Satie: Contemporary Composers. London: Dennis Dobson.
- Nichols, Roger (2002). The Harlequin Years: Music in Paris 1917–1929. London: Thames and Hudson. ISBN 978-0-500-51095-7.
- Orledge, Robert (1990). Satie the Composer. Cambridge: Cambridge University Press. ISBN 978-0-521-35037-2.
- Penman, Ian (2025). Erik Satie Three Piece Suite. MIT Press. ISBN 978-1-63590-254-9.
- Potter, Caroline (2016). Erik Satie: A Parisian Composer and his World. Woodbridge: Boydell Press. ISBN 978-1-78327-083-5.
- Potter, Caroline (2017). French Music Since Berlioz. London: Routledge. ISBN 978-1-315-09389-5.
- Rey, Anne (1974). Erik Satie (in French). Paris: Seuil. ISBN 978-2-02-000255-4.
- Rosinsky, Thérèse Diamand (1994). Suzanne Valadon. New York: Universe. ISBN 978-0-87663-777-7.
- Satie, Erik (1981). Ornella Volta (ed.). Écrits (second ed.). Paris: Éditions Champ libre. ISBN 978-2-85184-073-8.
- Strickland, Edward (2000). Minimalism: Origins. Bloomington: Indiana University Press. ISBN 978-0-253-21388-4.
- Templier, Pierre-Daniel (1932). Erik Satie. Translated by Elena L. French; David S. French. Cambridge, Massachusetts: MIT Press. OCLC 1034659768.
- Weeks, David (1995). Eccentrics. London: Weidenfeld & Nicolson. ISBN 978-0-297-81447-4.
- Whiting, Steven Moore (1999). Satie the Bohemian: From Cabaret to Concert Hall. Oxford: Oxford University Press. ISBN 978-0-19-816458-6.
- Williamson, John (2005). Words and Music. Liverpool: Liverpool University Press. ISBN 978-0-85323-619-1.
