= Steffen Schleiermacher =

German composer, pianist, and conductor

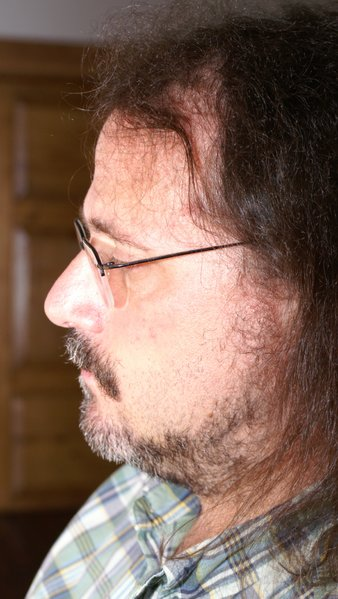
Steffen Schleiermacher.

Steffen Schleiermacher (born Halle, 3 May 1960) is a German composer, pianist, and conductor.

After studying at the Leipzig Music School with Siegfried Thiele, he continued working there as a music theory and ear training assistant. From 1985 until 1986, he was a master student at Akademie der Künste in Berlin with Friedrich Goldmann. In addition, he took a master course in piano at the Köln Music School with Aloys Kontarsky in 1989/1990. In 1988, he founded the Ensemble Avantgarde which is devoted to contemporary classical music.

Schleiermacher's prizes and fellowship awards include the Gaudeamus Competition (1985), Kranichstein Music Prize (1986), Hanns Eisler Prize of the GDR Radio for his Concerto for Viola and Chamber Ensemble (1989), Prize of the Christoph and Stephan Kaske Foundation, Munich (1991), Mendelssohn Scholarship awarded by the GDR Ministry of Culture (1988), German Music Council Fellowship (1989/90), Fellowship of the Kulturfond Foundation (1992–94, 1997), Fellowship of the German Academy at the Villa Massimo in Rome (1992), Japan Foundation Fellowship (1997) for study for several months in Japan, and Fellowship of the Cité des Arts in Paris.

His recording releases include most works by composers such as Erik Satie, Philip Glass, Morton Feldman and Arnold Schoenberg. For Musikproduktion Dabringhaus und Grimm he has recorded the complete piano music of John Cage. He also plays pieces by Asian composers - such as Toshio Hosokawa and Ichiyanagi (Japan); and Slamet Abdul Sjukur, Michael Asmara and Soe Tjen Marching (Indonesia).

Steffen Schleiermacher is related to the influential 19th century protestant theologian and Plato-translator Friedrich Schleiermacher.
