= Vieux Sequins et vieilles cuirasses =

1913 piano composition by Erik Satie

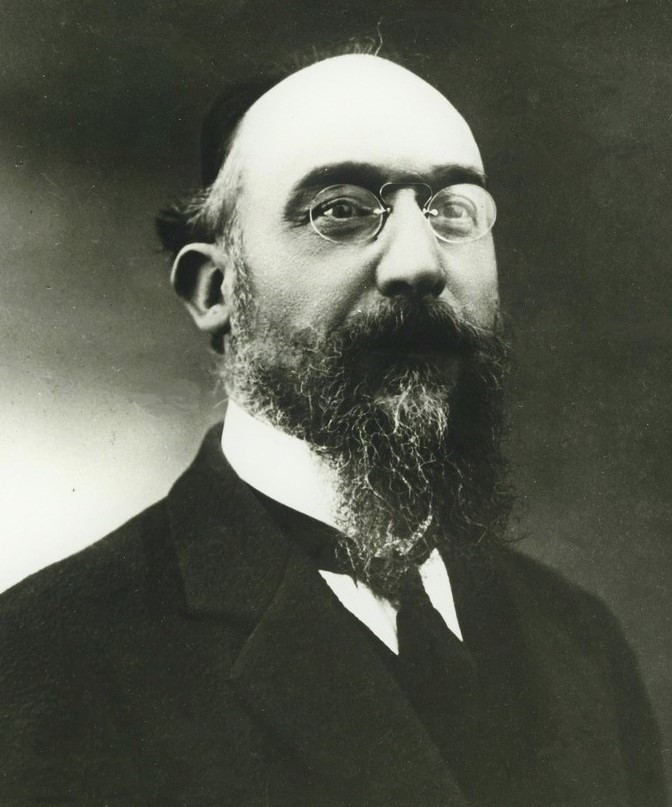
Erik Satie

Vieux Sequins et vieilles cuirasses (Old Sequins and Ancient Breastplates) is a 1913 piano composition by Erik Satie. One of his humoristic keyboard suites, it was published by the firm E. Demets that year but not premiered until 1917. In performance it lasts about 5 minutes.

== Description ==
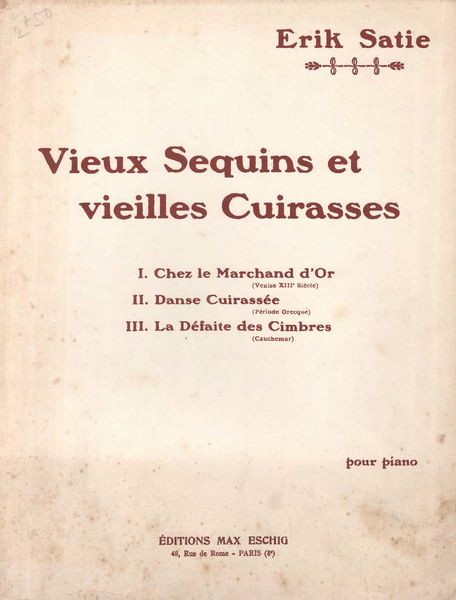

Satie completed the three pieces of the Vieux Sequins between September 9 and 17, 1913. Greed and the military are the main targets of its satire but Satie ramps up the irony by toning down the music, opting for gentler chords and a refined tone overall. His trademark witty musical quotations - from opera, martial music and children's songs - are more prominent here than usual.

The "sequins" of the title are not the fashion item but a Venetian gold coin used for some 500 years until the fall of the Republic of Venice under Napoleon (1797).

1. Chez le marchand d'or (Venise, XIIIe Siècle) (At the Gold Merchant's [Venice, 13th Century] )

- For Ricardo Viñes

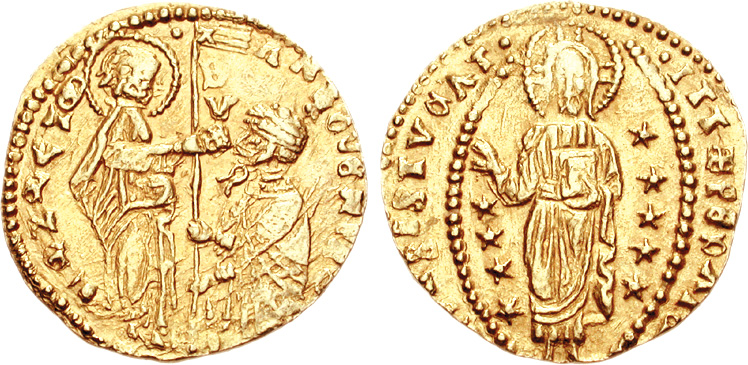
A 14th Century gold Sequin

Peu vite. Money - which Satie seldom had and was careless with when he did - was a topic he rarely broached in his extramusical humor. With a quick nod to Shakespeare in the title, we are introduced to a Venetian gold merchant going berserk over his precious inventory of sequins. He hugs and kisses them, stuffs them into his mouth, almost makes love to them. Veering from the modal to the chromatic, the music slowly builds to a quote from "La Ronde du Veau d'Or" ("The Dance of the Golden Calf") from Charles Gounod's opera Faust (1859). At the end the old merchant is left "all stooping and stiff".

2. Danse cuirassée (Période grecque) (Armor-plated Dance [Greek Period] )

- For M.-D. Calvocoressi

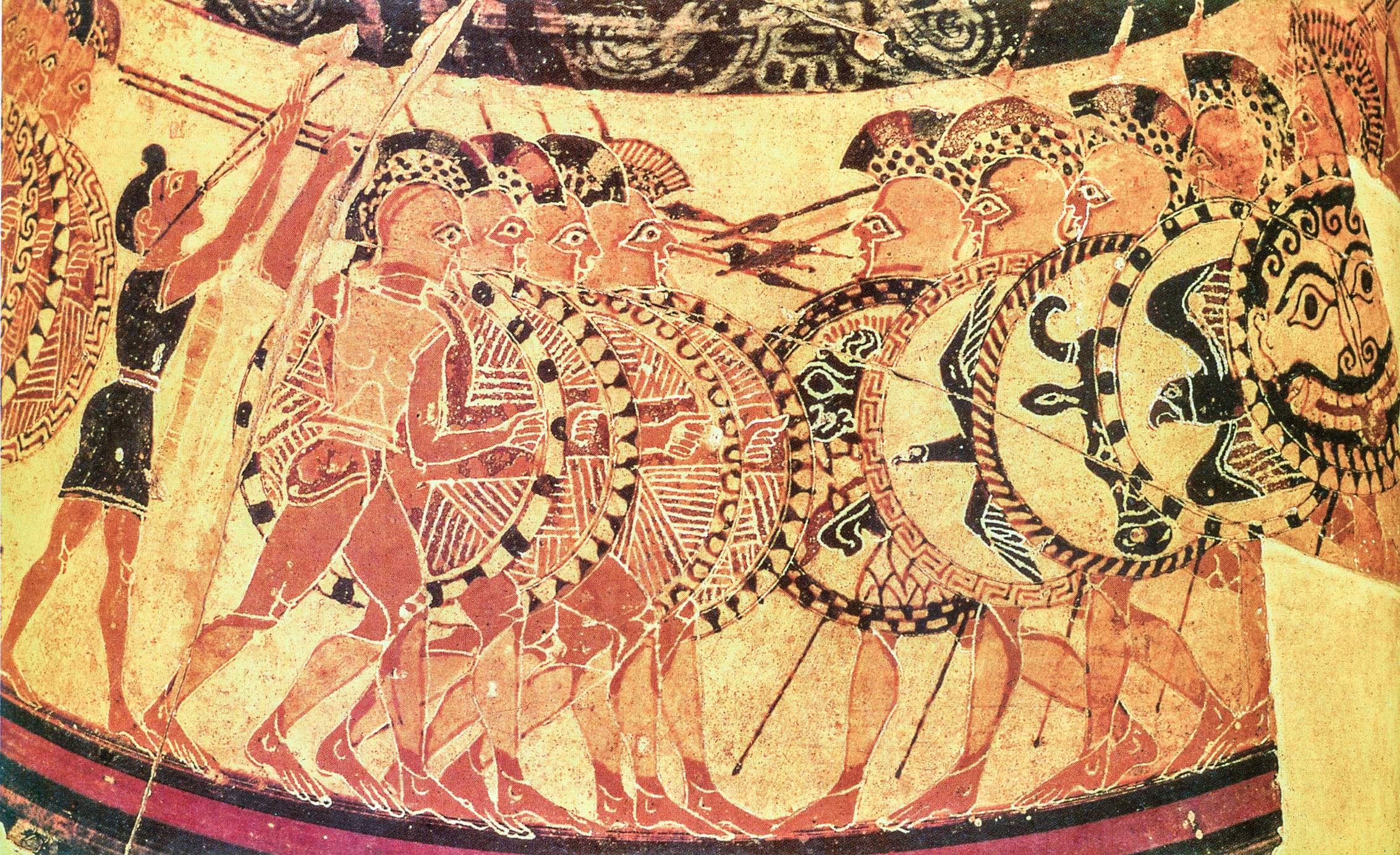
Greek Hoplites going to war to the sounds of music (7th Century BC)

Modéré - Pas noble et militaire. This "Armor-plated Dance" is a set of variations on the famous French bugle call Aux champs en marchant ("To the Field of Battle"), transported to Ancient Greece. Ostensibly a march with a "Noble and military step", it sounds closer to tiptoeing due to its p dynamics and restrained handling of the G-major melody, harmonized with Satie's delightfully quirky chromatics. In the text of his piano piece Vexations (1893) Satie had written, "it would be advisable to prepare oneself beforehand, and in the deepest silence, by serious immobilities". The hoplite performers of the Danse cuirassée do just that, standing docilely at attention in two rows before "Each of the dancers receives a sabre blow that cuts off his head". The aftermath is quickly dismissed with a dry, mumbling repeating pattern in the bass. Musicologist Robert Orledge wrote of this piece, "One might well describe Satie's Danse cuirassée (1913) as a musical 'ready-made' because it consists entirely of a borrowed popular song. As such it anticipates the first sculptural 'ready-made' (by Marcel Duchamp) by a year".

3. La Défaite des Cimbres (Cauchemar) (The Defeat of the Cimbri [Nightmare] )

- For Émile Vuillermoz

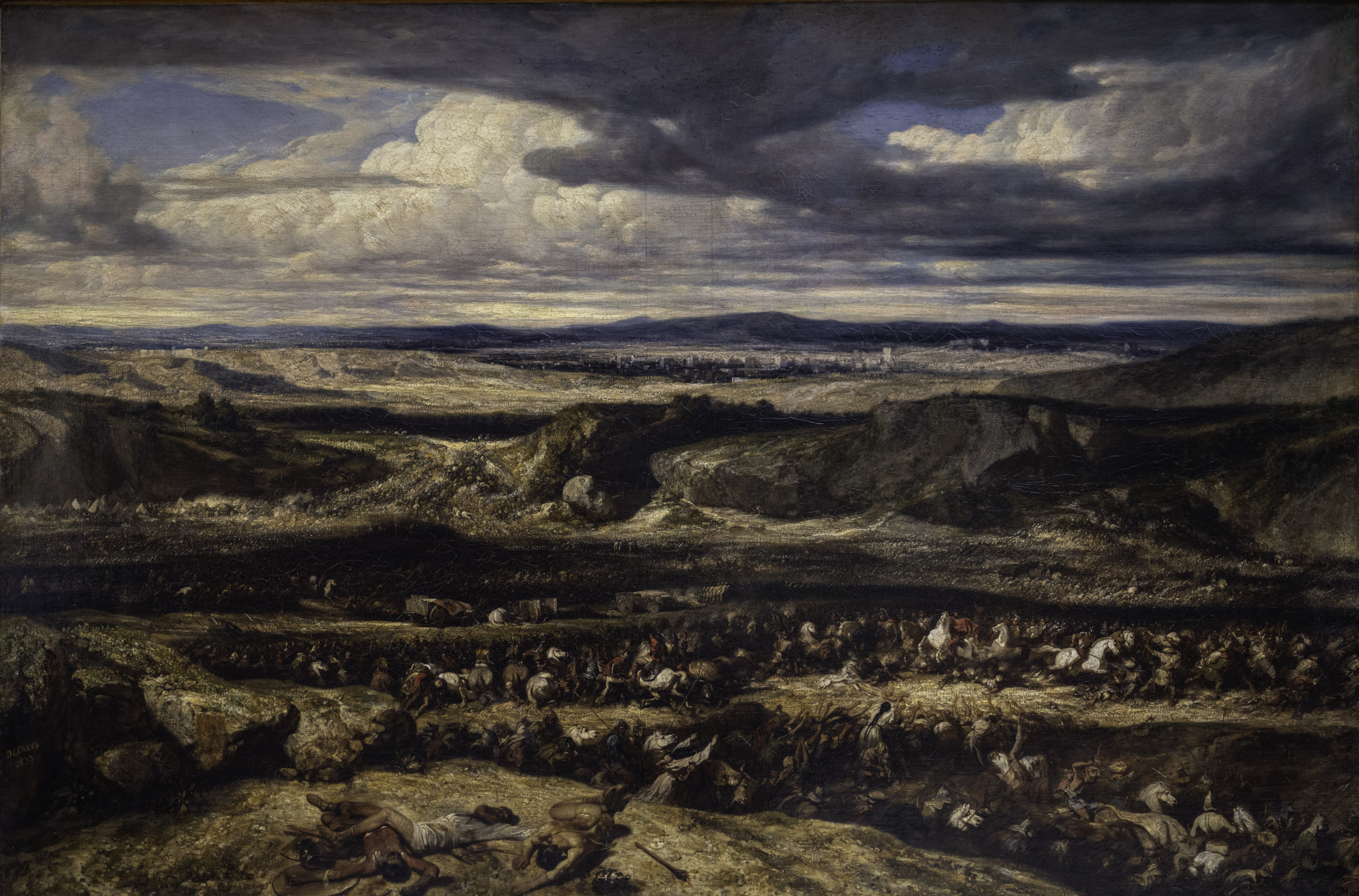
The Defeat of the Cimbri (1833) by Alexandre-Gabriel Decamps

Sans trop de mouvement. As if to compensate for the straightforward silliness of the two previous movements, Satie packs the finale with an absurd potpourri of intertextual references. It begins with a story at the top of the score: Every day a young boy is given "a kind of odd little course in general history" dredged up from the vague memories of his aged grandfather. These random facts turn into a nightmarish jumble as the boy dreams of Ancient Roman general Marius, 7th Century King of the Franks Dagobert, and the 18th Century Duke of Marlborough joining forces to fight in the Cimbrian War (c. 100 BC), winning victory over King Boiorix of the Cimbri at the Battle of Mons-en-Pévèle - which took place in 1304.

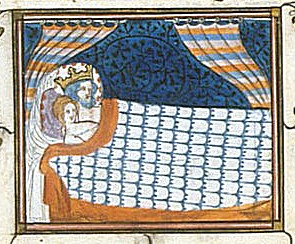
"The Good King Dagobert" with one of his mistresses. 14th Century illuminated manuscript

The effect grandpa's "teachings" have on the boy is mirrored in the music through the intertwining of two classic French children's tunes: Marlbrough s'en va-t-en guerre (Marlborough is off to War), known in English-speaking countries as For He's a Jolly Good Fellow, and Le bon roi Dagobert (The Good King Dagobert). Both were adult satirical songs mocking those in power (royalty, foreign enemies), cleverly disguised as nursery rhymes to sneak past the authorities. Le bon roi Dagobert dates from around the French Revolution and depicts the monarch as a selfish, absent-minded brat, constantly scolded by his advisor Saint Eligius. The real Dagobert lived a life of debauchery and the song's opening verse, "The good King Dagobert had his pants on inside out", likely alludes to his bevy of mistresses and concubines.

More dreamlike glimpses show up in the annotations - "Rain of javelins", "Boiorix, King of the Cimbrians", "He is chagrined". We see the title of Aimé Maillart's operetta Les Dragons de Villars, but instead of a musical quote there is an implied military pun for the pianist, "Villars' dragoons". The coda, marked "Grandiose", is a rather impressive original melody with one last historical tidbit: "Le Sacre de Charles X (267 bis)" ("The coronation of Charles X [No. 267a]"). This refers to the dissolute, reactionary King of France Charles X, whose reign was so unpopular he was overthrown by the people in the 1830 July Revolution. Against a backdrop of insolent kiddie songs, Satie appears to draw a line from casual subversion to open insurrection in dealing with tyranny.

== Premiere ==
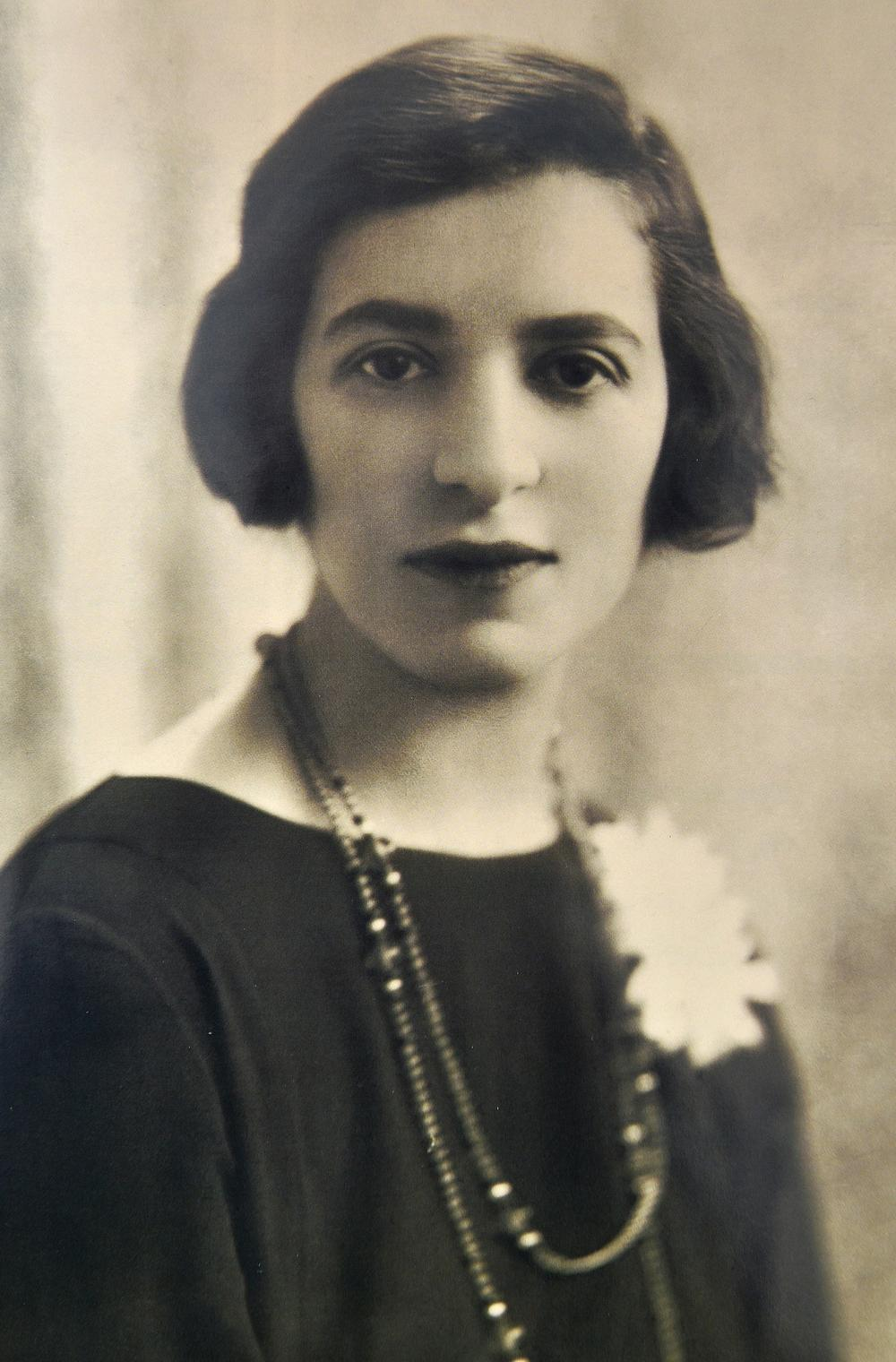
Marcelle Meyer

In a 1913 publisher's blurb signed "A.L." (Alfred Leslie, his middle names), Satie announced that the Vieux Sequins et vieilles cuirasses would bring to a close his "curious and pleasingly original series" of humorous piano suites. Thanks to popular demand this proved not to be the case, but the promotion of Vieux Sequins, and all his 1914 compositions, would be postponed for two years or more due to World War I. When Satie dusted off the unplayed score in late 1917, he had entered a new phase of his career with the ballet Parade and put the humoristic piano music behind him.

Vieux Sequins et vieilles cuirasses was premiered by pianist Marcelle Meyer at the Théâtre du Vieux-Colombier in Paris on December 11, 1917, during a concert of contemporary music organized by singer Jane Bathori. The occasion launched Satie's professional relationship with Meyer, who in the 1920s would supplant Ricardo Viñes as his favored keyboard interpreter. He dedicated to her the first of his Nocturnes (1919) and she gave the first performance of the Premier Menuet (1920), his last composition for solo piano. In January 1922 Meyer produced an important three-concert series in Paris in which she presented Satie's music in historical contexts, playing it alongside works from the early clavecin masters to the current avant-garde; this event saw the long-delayed premiere of Sports et divertissements. And in June 1924 they teamed up on short notice to play two of his piano duets as an impromptu ballet score called Premier Amour for the Soirées de Paris company. These marked Satie's final public appearances as a performer. Meyer began making records in 1925 and would leave a discography later compiled into 17 CDs, but curiously she never recorded a note of Satie's music.

== Recordings ==
Jean-Joël Barbier (BAM, 1967), Aldo Ciccolini (twice, for Angel in 1968 and EMI in 1987), Frank Glazer (Vox, 1968, reissued 1990), Yūji Takahashi (Denon, 1979), Daniel Varsano (CBS, 1979), France Clidat (Forlane, 1980), Philippe Entremont (CBS, 1981), Jean-Pierre Armengaud (Le Chant du Monde, 1986), Roland Pöntinen (BIS, 1986), Anne Queffélec (Virgin Classics, 1988), Pascal Rogé (Decca, 1989), Yitkin Seow (Hyperion, 1989), Peter Lawson (EMI, 1989), Gabriel Tacchino (Disques Pierre Verany, 1993), Klára Körmendi (Naxos Records, 1994), Bojan Gorišek (Audiophile Classics, 1994), Olof Höjer (Swedish Society Discofil, 1996), Peter Dickinson (Olympia, 2001), Jean-Yves Thibaudet (Decca, 2003), Håkon Austbø (Brilliant Classics, 2006), Francine Kay (Analekta, 2006), Cristina Ariagno (Brilliant Classics, 2007), Jan Kaspersen (Scandinavian Classics, 2007), Marco Rapetti (Dynamic, 2007), Alexandre Tharaud (Harmonia Mundi, 2009), Jeroen van Veen (Brilliant Classics, 2016), Noriko Ogawa (BIS, 2016), Nicolas Horvath (Grand Piano, 2019), Steffen Schleiermacher (MDG, 2021).
