= Avant-dernières Pensées =

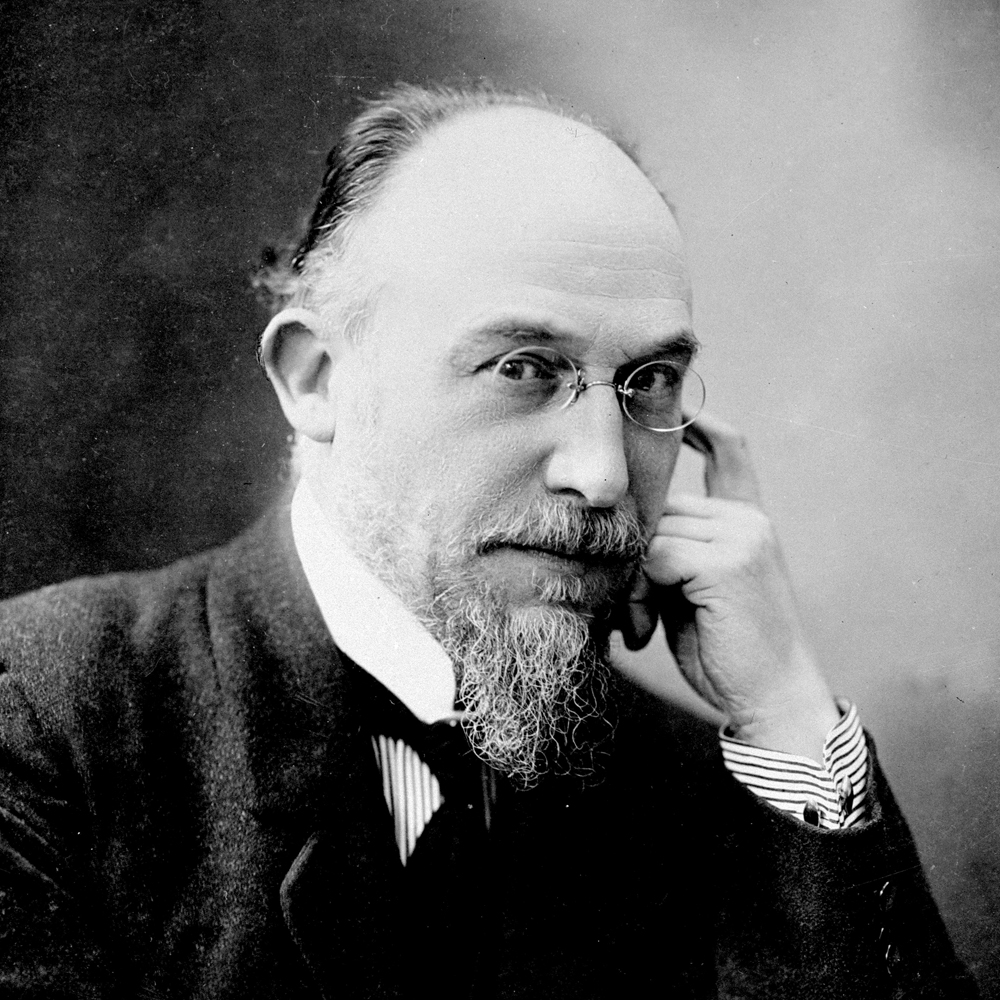
Erik Satie

The Avant-dernières Pensées (Penultimate Thoughts) is a 1915 piano composition by Erik Satie. The last of his humoristic piano suites of the 1910s, it was premiered by the composer at the Galerie Thomas in Paris on May 30, 1916, and published that same year. A typical performance lasts 3–4 minutes.

== Background ==
The outbreak of World War I in July 1914 was a setback for Satie just as he was gaining belated recognition as a composer. Although at age 48 he remained a civilian, wartime conditions seriously disrupted French musical life. Publishers ceased commissioning his music and the pending publication of his 1914 compositions was suspended for two years or more. As he had renounced playing piano in Paris cabarets – his primary source of income for many years – Satie had only the generosity of friends and occasional private teaching to subsist on. In August 1915 he appealed to composer Paul Dukas to help him get financial assistance from charitable organizations, remarking, "For me, this war is like a sort of Apocalypse, more idiotic than real." Some aid must have been forthcoming, for he was soon at work on the Pensées.

== Description ==
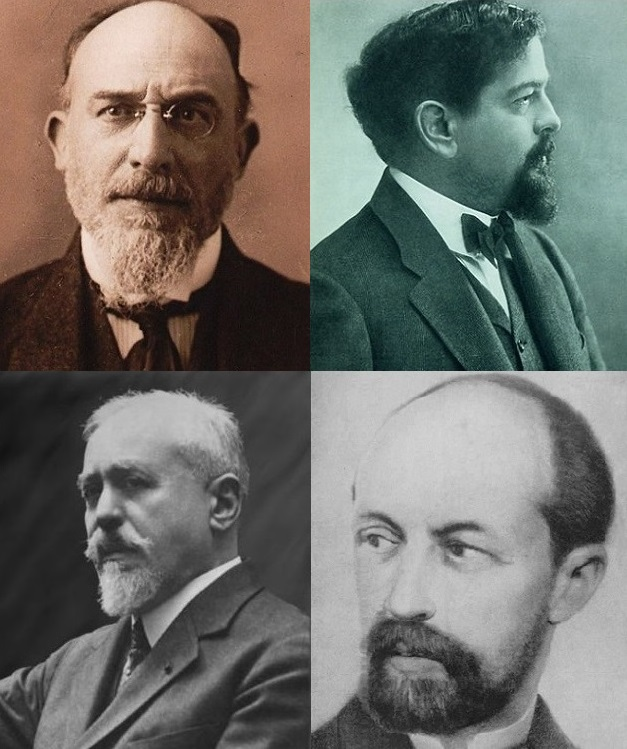
Erik Satie (top left) and the dedicatees of Avant-dernières pensées: Claude Debussy (top right), Paul Dukas (bottom left), and Albert Roussel.

Originally entitled Étrange Rumeurs (Strange Rumors), the three pieces comprising Avant-dernières pensées were completed between August 23 and October 6, 1915. Satie dedicated them to three important colleagues:

1. Idylle, for Claude Debussy
2. Aubade, for Paul Dukas
3. Méditation, for Albert Roussel

Debussy was Satie's closest friend for over 20 years, but their relations were growing strained at this time and would end bitterly in 1917. Dukas was a faithful friend to both. Roussel was Satie's teacher of counterpoint at the Schola Cantorum (1905–1908) and guided him through the development of his mature contrapuntal style. In the 1920s Satie vociferously defended Dukas and Roussel against their critics in the French musical establishment.

Unlike most of his other piano suites of the period, the pensées contain no musical quotations for parodic effect, nor does Satie attempt to pastiche his fellow composers. In each piece bitonal melodic phrases evolve over an unchanging ostinato played from beginning to end: a four-note motif in the Idylle, rapid triplets in the Meditation. In the Aubade it takes the form of two arpeggiated chords (the second played twice) that suggest the strumming of a guitar or mandolin. The conclusions of the outer two movements are quietly punctuated with a single chord; the strumming obstinato has the final say in the Aubade.

The whimsy of Satie's extramusical commentaries is somewhat subdued here. Each concerns a poet, further described in the Aubade as an "old" poet, calling to mind how Satie categorized composers as either "poets" or "pundits." Robert Orledge has proposed that the texts for the first two pieces are "observations" of the dedicatees. The nature-loving poet of Idylle contemplates a tree-lined creek under sun and moonlight but takes no pleasure in it because, he confesses, "my heart is very small." The morning serenade of Aubade originally bore the subtitle "A fiancé beneath the balcony of his fiancée", and could well allude to Dukas' courtship of Suzanne Pereyra, 18 years his junior, whom he finally married in 1916. Orledge further writes that the Méditation, despite the dedication to Roussel, is a self-portrait: A poet is locked in a tower, where he is beset by winds that are manifestations of the devil (which he mistakes for the spirit of genius) and indigestion brought on by "bitter disappointments."

== Performance and publication ==
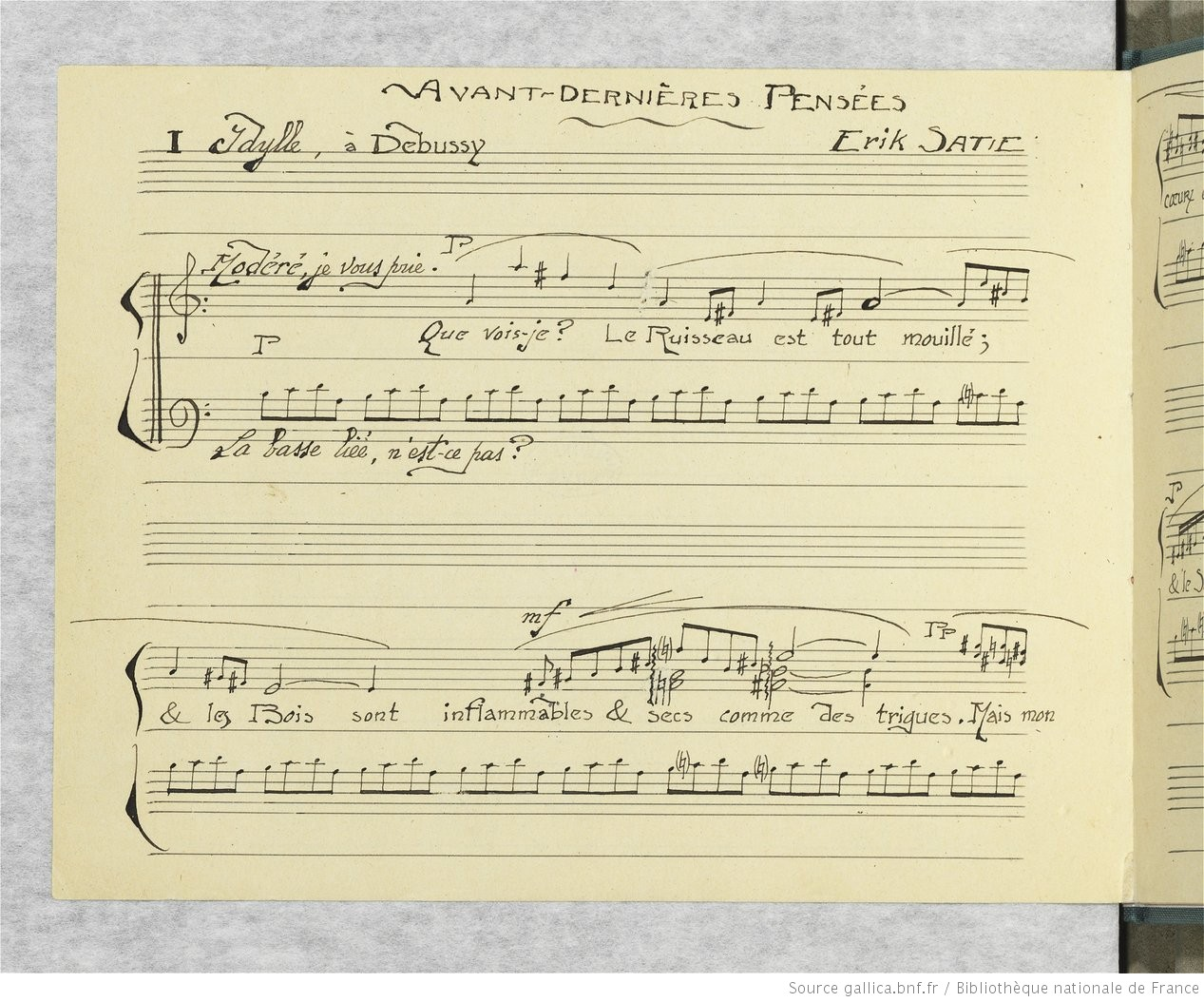
First page of Satie's autograph manuscript

Satie's fortunes improved significantly in 1916 with the gradual resumption of cultural life in Paris. He gave a run-through of the Avant-dernières Pensées during a concert of the Société Lyre et Palette on April 18 before the official premiere at the Galerie Thomas. The latter was part of a benefit "for artists affected by the War" sponsored by Germaine Bongard, sister of fashion designer Paul Poiret, and with a programme designed by Henri Matisse and Pablo Picasso. Thanks in part to Satie's patron Misia Sert the event attracted Le Tout-Paris. Biographer Mary E. Davis noted, "For Satie the evening chez Bongard marked a significant career juncture, establishing him firmly as a darling of the creative set and laying the groundwork for his entrée into the city's loftiest artistic domains." Rouart-Lerolle published the score later in 1916 but by then Satie was moving on to bigger things: his ballet Parade (1917) was in the planning stage and towards the end of the year he would receive the commission for Socrate (1918). The one-off Neoclassical parody Sonatine bureaucratique (1917) provided what Steven Moore Whiting called "the culmination and also the end of Satie's humoristic piano music." His final solo keyboard compositions, the Nocturnes (1919) and Premier Menuet (1920), were of a markedly serious character.

In his essay "The Erik Satie Case" (1938) pianist Alfred Cortot found the Avant-dernières Pensées "curiously insignificant," an opinion shared by Rollo Myers in his 1948 biography of the composer. But the suite has since become one of the more frequently performed of Satie's later piano works.

== In other media ==
Director Tim Southam's 1994 CBC TV movie Satie and Suzanne features an elaborate dance number set to the Aubade from the Avant-dernières Pensées. It was choreographed by Veronica Tennant, who plays Satie's onetime lover Suzanne Valadon in the film. The pianist on the soundtrack is Reinbert de Leeuw.

== Recordings ==
Satie disciple Francis Poulenc made the first recording of the Pensées in 1950. It has also been recorded by Aldo Ciccolini, Jacques Février, Philippe Entremont, France Clidat, Daniel Varsano, Yūji Takahashi, Anne Queffélec, Pascal Rogé, Jean-Pierre Armengaud, Michel Legrand, Jean-Joël Barbier, Olof Höjer, Jean-Yves Thibaudet, and Alexandre Tharaud. In 1970 it was arranged by the Camarata Contemporary Chamber Group for their album The Music of Erik Satie: The Velvet Gentleman.
