= La Belle Excentrique =

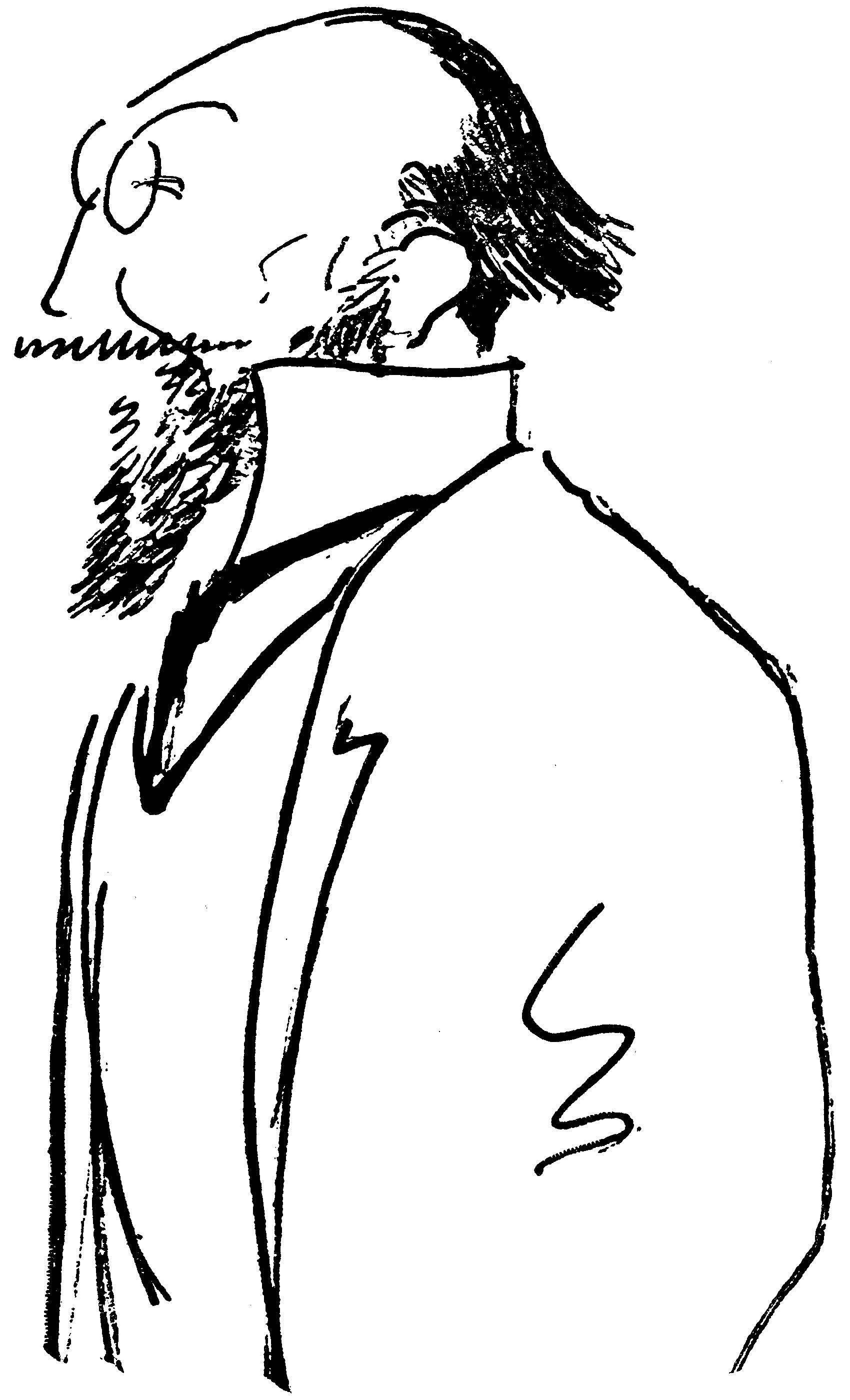
Erik Satie by Alfred Frueh

La Belle Excentrique (The Eccentric Beauty or The Beautiful Eccentric Lady) is a dance suite for small orchestra by French composer Erik Satie. A parody of music hall clichés, it was conceived as a choreographic stage work and by modern standards can be considered a ballet. Satie gave it the whimsical subtitle Fantaisie sérieuse ("A Serious Fantasy"). It was premiered at the Théâtre du Colisée in Paris on June 14, 1921, conducted by Vladimir Golschmann. The composer later arranged it for piano four hands.

== Music ==
Satie composed this set of solo dances between July and October 1920. It was a high-spirited throwback to his turn-of-the-century cabaret idiom after a brief "serious" period that had produced the cantata Socrate (1918) and the piano Nocturnes (1919). The suite consists of three dances (march, waltz, can-can) and an instrumental ritornello.

1. Grande Ritournelle (Grand Ritornello)
2. Marche franco-lunaire (Franco-Lunar March)
3. Valse du mystérieux baiser dans l'œil (Waltz of the Mysterious Kiss in the Eye)
4. Cancan grand-mondain (High-Society Cancan)

Early sketches show that Satie originally planned La belle as "a musical tour through three periods of Parisian popular entertainment" under the following headings: "1900: Marche pour une grande cocotte"; "1910: Elégance du cirque (Ecuyère)"; and "1920: Cancan moderne". He soon dropped the chronological scheme and proceeded to delve into his own musical past, giving the dances quirky titles that recalled his humoristic piano pieces of the previous decade. For the Grande Ritournelle he recycled material from one of his unpublished cabaret songs, Légende californienne, a cakewalk from 1905.

In all the numbers Satie overruled his customary dry irony in favor of a robust (some called it vulgar) vaudeville sensibility. The melodies are popular-inspired, the matter-of-fact dance rhythms occasionally whipped along by galloping or stentorian percussion. Despite the lowbrow subject matter Satie was as always scrupulous in his composing methods. He rewrote the opening bars of the Marche 25 times before achieving what he felt was the right level of off-kilter dissonance to mark the title character's first appearance onstage.

Pianist-musicologist Olof Höjer observed that the function and place in the suite of the Ritournelle are not entirely clear. Satie evidently intended it as a recurring interlude between the dances to give the performer time to change costumes, but in the first production only one costume was used. The Ritournelle also makes an effective introduction and is commonly performed as such, especially in recordings.

The suite is scored for 1 piccolo, 1 oboe, 1 clarinet, 1 horn, 1 trumpet, 1 trombone, percussion for 2 musicians (snare drum, cymbals, bass drum), piano and strings. Without reprises of the Ritournelle the music lasts about 8 minutes.

== History ==
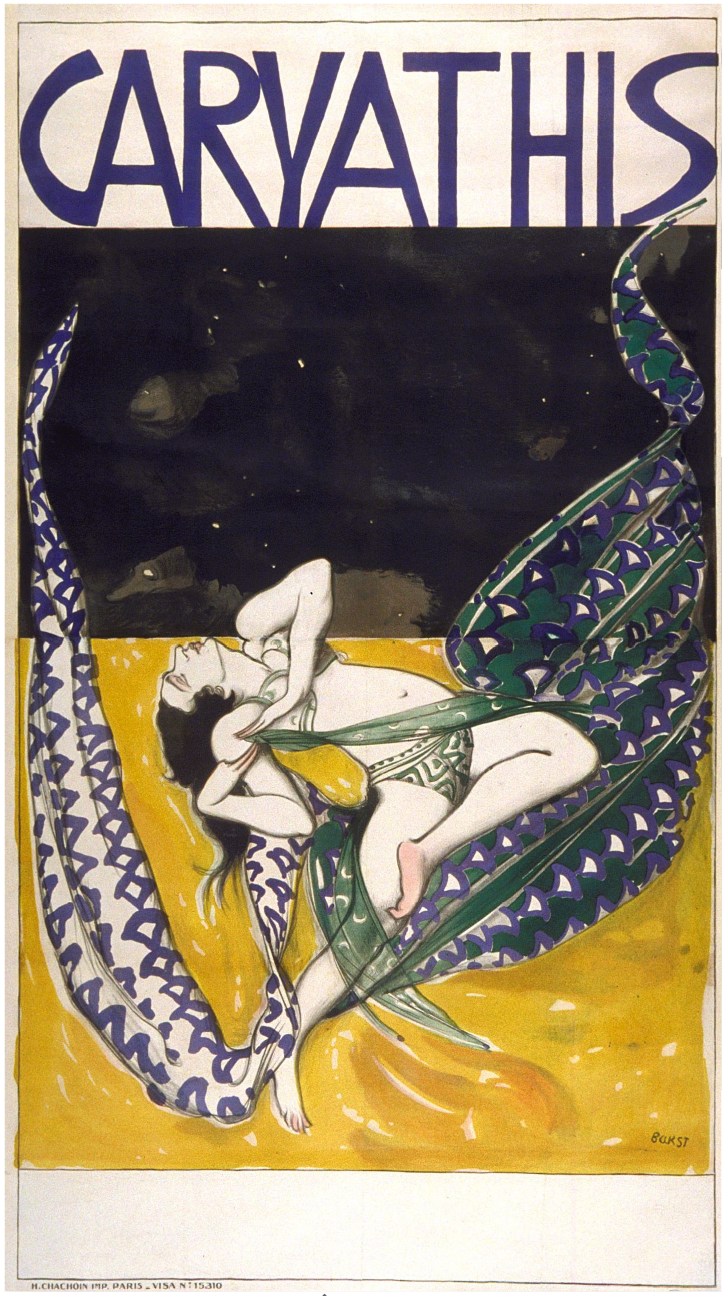
Caryathis, poster by Léon Bakst

La Belle Excentrique was commissioned by the avant-garde dancer and choreographer Élisabeth (Élise) Toulemont (1889–1971), who performed under the stage name Caryathis. A student of Léo Staats, she won notoriety during World War I with her outré interpretations of contemporary music. Her style was rooted in character dance and served up an eclectic mix of classical technique, popular and international dance forms, pantomime, eroticism, and ironic humor. In the early 1920s she threw orgiastic parties at her Paris home, some of which the usually hyper-moral Satie attended with voyeuristic fascination. She later married the novelist Marcel Jouhandeau.

For her first major postwar recital Caryathis collaborated with author and artist Jean Cocteau, who at that time was a spokesman for Satie and the composers of Les Six, and the program they assembled focused primarily on their music. Satie was paid 500 francs each for his three dance numbers; he threw in the Grande Ritournelle for free. The title La Belle Excentrique was coined by Cocteau.

Caryathis began her choreography in October 1920, with Satie protégé Francis Poulenc assisting as a rehearsal pianist. Poulenc wrote to Belgian music critic Paul Collaer that it was "a work of genius". An invitation-only preview was given at the home of actor Pierre Bertin on January 8, 1921. Satie was closely involved in all phases of the project. Couturier Paul Poiret and artists Marie Laurencin, Kees van Dongen, and Jean Hugo were approached to create Belle's costume, but the composer rejected their designs as too charming or too crass. "My music calls for something outrageous," he remarked, "a woman who is more like a zebra than a doe." Cocteau solved the problem by designing a midriff-baring outfit he described as befitting "a mad American woman from the Salvation Army out for revenge." Nicole Groult (Poiret's sister) provided a creepy face mask that hid all but the dancer's eyes.

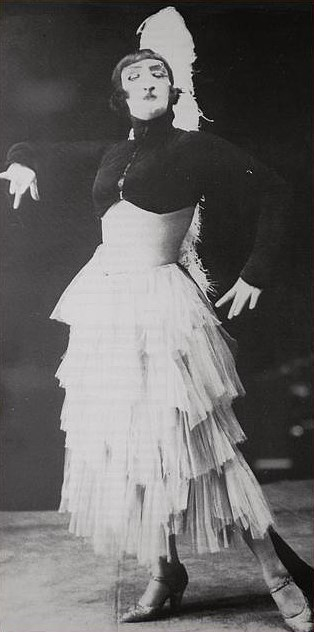
Caryathis in the 1921 premiere of La Belle Excentrique. Costume designed by Jean Cocteau, with face mask by Nicole Groult

Cocteau also wrote a programmatic text for La Belle that caused friction between the collaborators. He envisioned Belle as an African-American jazz dancer and tried to influence the choreography accordingly, while Satie was adamant that she be thoroughly Parisian. "It's not our fault if Cocteau is stuffed full of his 'jazz' – quite stuffed", Satie told Caryathis. The text does not appear to have been used and no trace of it survives.

The June 14, 1921 premiere of Caryathis' one-woman show at the Colisée was well received. One critic noted of her work on La Belle, "It seems that what unfolds before our eyes is not ballet, but one of the nightmarish visions of Baudelaire or Edgar Allan Poe." In July 1921 the program moved to Paul Poiret's fashionable garden theatre L'Oasis, where Satie made a single guest appearance conducting his music. He had not led an orchestra since his early days at Le Chat Noir and appeared to be nervous; by the end of the performance, which lasted no more than 15 minutes, he was drenched with sweat. He never conducted again.

The original orchestral score and Satie's reduction for piano four-hands were published by Éditions de La Sirène in 1922. An arrangement of three of the numbers for solo piano (excluding the Cancan grand-mondain) also exists.

Caryathis became so identified with her role that she later titled her autobiography The Joys and Sorrows of an Eccentric Beauty. In it she recalled how, in the early summer of 1925, she decided to quit the stage and consigned all the mementos of her career to a fire in her backyard. Her costume for La Belle had just started to burn when she received a telegram from composer Georges Auric that Satie was terminally ill in a Paris hospital. She rushed to his bedside for a final reunion, and he died not long afterwards. "Satie appeared not to care about others," she reminisced, "but he had a kind heart, even if it was, certainly, intolerant of stupidity, which he dealt with by irony...His existence was governed by music and his whole life sacrificed to the toil of inspiration and to the pursuit of true knowledge."

Like much of Satie's music, La Belle Excentrique slipped into obscurity until after World War II. His earliest biographers, Pierre-Daniel Templier (1932) and Rollo H. Myers (1948), found it superficial. It was first heard in England on June 14, 1949, with Constant Lambert conducting the London Symphony Orchestra in a broadcast for the BBC Third Programme. Pianists Francis Poulenc and Jacques Février made the first commercial recording of the piece in 1959 (Musidisc). Since then the piano duet version has been more frequently performed, though La Belle remains one of Satie's lesser-known compositions.

== Recordings ==
For Orchestra: Maurice Abravanel – Utah Symphony Orchestra (Grande Ritournelle only, Vanguard, 1968), Friedrich Cerha – Ensemble "Die Reihe" (Vox, 1970), Bernard Herrmann – London Festival Players (Decca, 1971), Toru Yuki – Danceries Ensemble (Denon, 1987), Michel Plasson – Orchestre Du Capitole De Toulouse (EMI, 1988), and Yutaka Sado – Orchestre Des Concerts Lamoureux (Erato, 2001).

For Piano Duet: Aldo Ciccolini recorded it twice for EMI, overdubbing the second piano part himself in 1971 and paired with Gabriel Tacchino in 1988. Other recordings include Jean Wiener and Jean-Joël Barbier (Universal Classics France, 1971, reissued 2002), Chantal De Buchy and Théodore Paraskivesco (PG, 1978), Wyneke Jordans and Leo van Doeselaar (Etcetera, 1983), Anne Queffélec and Catherine Collard (Virgin Classics, 1988, reissued 2008), Jean-Pierre Armengaud and Dominique Merlet (Mandala, 1990), Klára Körmendi and Gábor Eckhardt (Naxos, 1994), Yūji Takahashi and Alain Planès (Denon, 1998), Bojan Gorisek and Tatiana Ognjanovic (Audiophile Classics, 1999), Jean-Philippe Collard and Pascal Rogé (Decca, 2000), Cristina Ariagno (both parts, Brilliant Classics, 2006), Alexandre Tharaud and Éric Le Sage (Harmonia Mundi, 2009), Sandra and Jeroen van Veen (Brilliant Classics, 2013).

For solo piano: Jean-Yves Thibaudet (Decca, 2002).
