= Chapitres tournés en tous sens =

Piano composition by Erik Satie

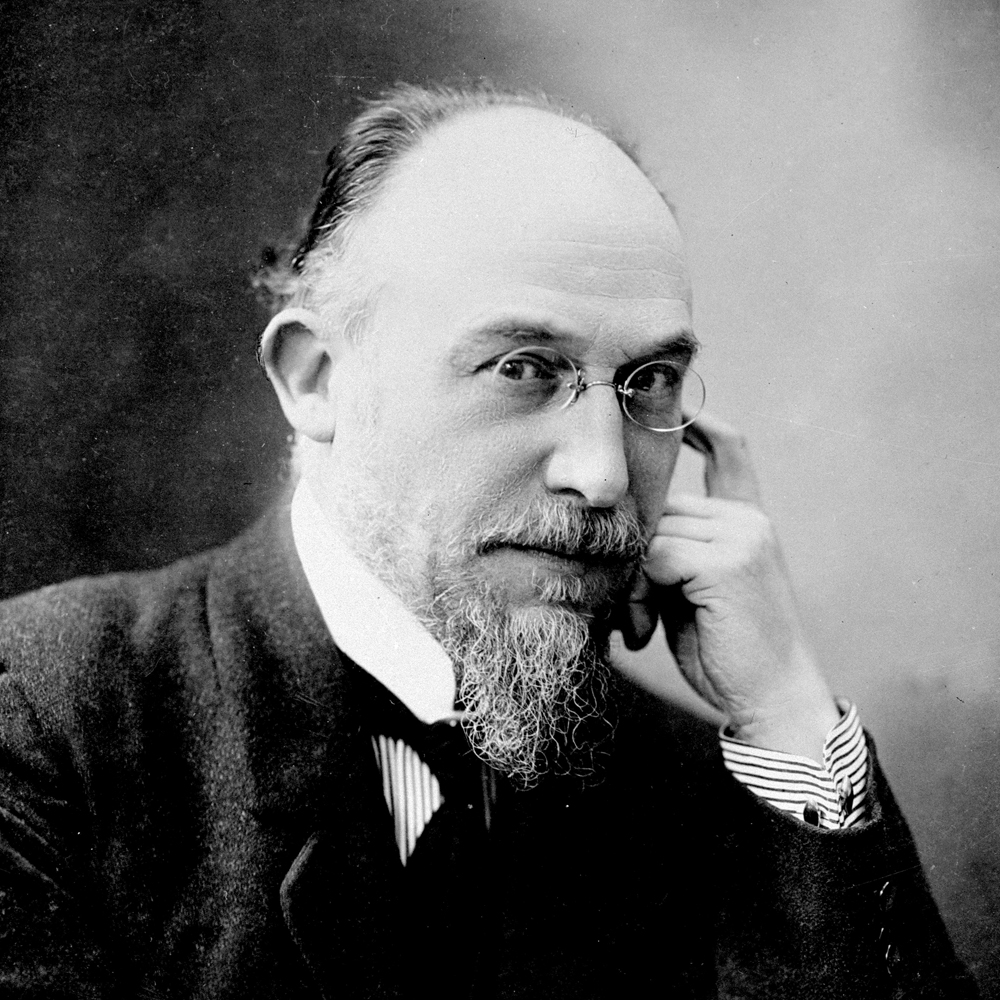
Erik Satie

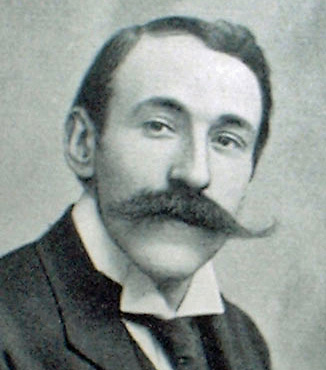
Pianist Ricardo Viñes, who premiered eight Satie works between 1913 and 1920.

Chapitres tournés en tous sens (Chapters Turned Every Which Way) is a 1913 piano composition by Erik Satie. One of his humoristic keyboard suites of the 1910s, it was published by the firm E. Demets that year. Ricardo Viñes gave the premiere at the Salle Erard in Paris on January 14, 1914. In performance it lasts about 5 minutes.

== Description ==
Satie announced the title of this suite as an upcoming project in his April 1913 advertisement in the periodical Le Guide du concert, although he did not begin sketching the music until late August. On September 16 he wrote to his protégé Alexis Roland-Manuel with ironic bluster, "I have just completed the Chapitres tournés en tous sens. I consider this a great triumph".

As with most of Satie's piano suites from this time, the Chapitres is a trilogy of unrelated pieces.

1. Celle qui parle trop (She Who Talks Too Much) – Vif
2. Le porteur de grosses pierres (The Hauler of Big Stones) – Très lent
3. Regrets des enfermés (Jonas et Latude) (Lament of the Confined [Jonah and Latude]) – Soyez modéré

The melodic lines are kept simple through the borrowings from operettas and children's songs, but backed up by Satie's unique and often experimental harmonic sense.

=== 1. Celle qui parle trop ===
For Robert Manuel

Satie left extensive sketches for the text of this piece, a sign of the growing importance the verbal element was assuming in his piano suites. A lady drags her husband through a department store, wearing him down with her purchases and gossip. Dizzying triplets illustrate her inane chatter ("I want a hat of solid mahogany", "Mrs. Thingummy has an umbrella made of bone", "Miss Whats-her-face has married a man as dry as a cuckoo") while her exasperated spouse grumbles to the tune of "Ne parle pas, Rose, je t'en supplie" ("Rose, do not speak, I beg you") from Aimé Maillart's operetta Les dragons de Villars (1856). This theme slows to a chromatically distorted end as the husband drops dead from exhaustion. The wife falls silent at last, and the man's final breath is quietly expelled with an unresolved eleventh chord.

=== 2. Le porteur de grosses pierres ===
For Monsieur Fernand Dreyfus

A little narrative preface picks up where the title leaves off, offering us glimpses of the protagonist:

He carries them on his back. He smirks and looks very sure of himself. His strength amazes the little children. We see him transporting an enormous stone, a hundred times bigger than himself. (It is a pumice stone).

The cocky laborer goes about his job accompanied by another borrowed operetta melody, "Vive la Paresse" ("Long Live Laziness") from Robert Planquette's Rip (1884). But a second narrative between the staves of the score shows he is vainly trying to hide his struggle with the burden. Shedding its confident tone the music begins to stagger, and in the suite's loudest moment the hauler drops the stone with a blunt fortissimo crash.

The punchline of the preface had a double meaning for Satie. One of his personal quirks was that he never washed his hands with soap, but with pumice stone.

=== 3. Regrets des enfermés (Jonas et Latude) ===
For Madame Claude Debussy

In the enigmatic finale the text spans millennia to unite two prisoners yearning for their freedom: the biblical Jonah from the belly of the whale, and the 18th Century schemer Jean Henri Latude from the Bastille, where he spent many years (when not escaping) for attempting to swindle Madame de Pompadour. Satie quotes the children's folk song Nous n'irons plus aux bois ("We will go to the woods no more"), a tune that had haunted his friend Claude Debussy for much of his career, notably in Jardins sous la pluie from his piano suite Estampes; and the piece is dedicated to Debussy's wife, singer Emma Bardac. Pianist Viñes, who premiered the Estampes in 1903, would have gotten these connections, but what they meant for Satie is open to question. Did he, as Robert Orledge speculated, think of Debussy as an imprisoned man after his controversial marriage to Bardac? If so this would have made the dedication painfully ironic. At any rate there are no attempts here to quote Debussy's music or mimic his style.

== Recordings ==
Notable recordings include those by Jean-Joël Barbier (Accord, 1971), Aldo Ciccolini (twice, for Angel in 1968 and EMI in 1987), Frank Glazer (Vox, 1968, reissued 1990), France Clidat (Forlane, 1980), Jean-Pierre Armengaud (Le Chant du Monde, 1986), Roland Pöntinen (BIS, 1986), Anne Queffélec (Virgin Classics, 1988), Pascal Rogé (Decca, 1989), Peter Lawson (EMI, 1989), Michel Legrand (Erato, 1993), Klára Körmendi (Naxos Records, 1994), Bojan Gorišek (Audiophile Classics, 1994), Olof Höjer (Swedish Society Discofil, 1996), Peter Dickinson (Olympia, 2001), Jean-Yves Thibaudet (Decca, 2003), Håkon Austbø (Brilliant Classics, 2006), John McCabe (Regis Records, 2006), Cristina Ariagno (Brilliant Classics, 2007), Alexandre Tharaud (Harmonia Mundi, 2009), Jeroen van Veen (Brilliant Classics, 2016), Noriko Ogawa (BIS, 2016), Steffen Schleiermacher (MDG, 2021).
