= Nocturnes (Satie) =

1919 set of piano compositions

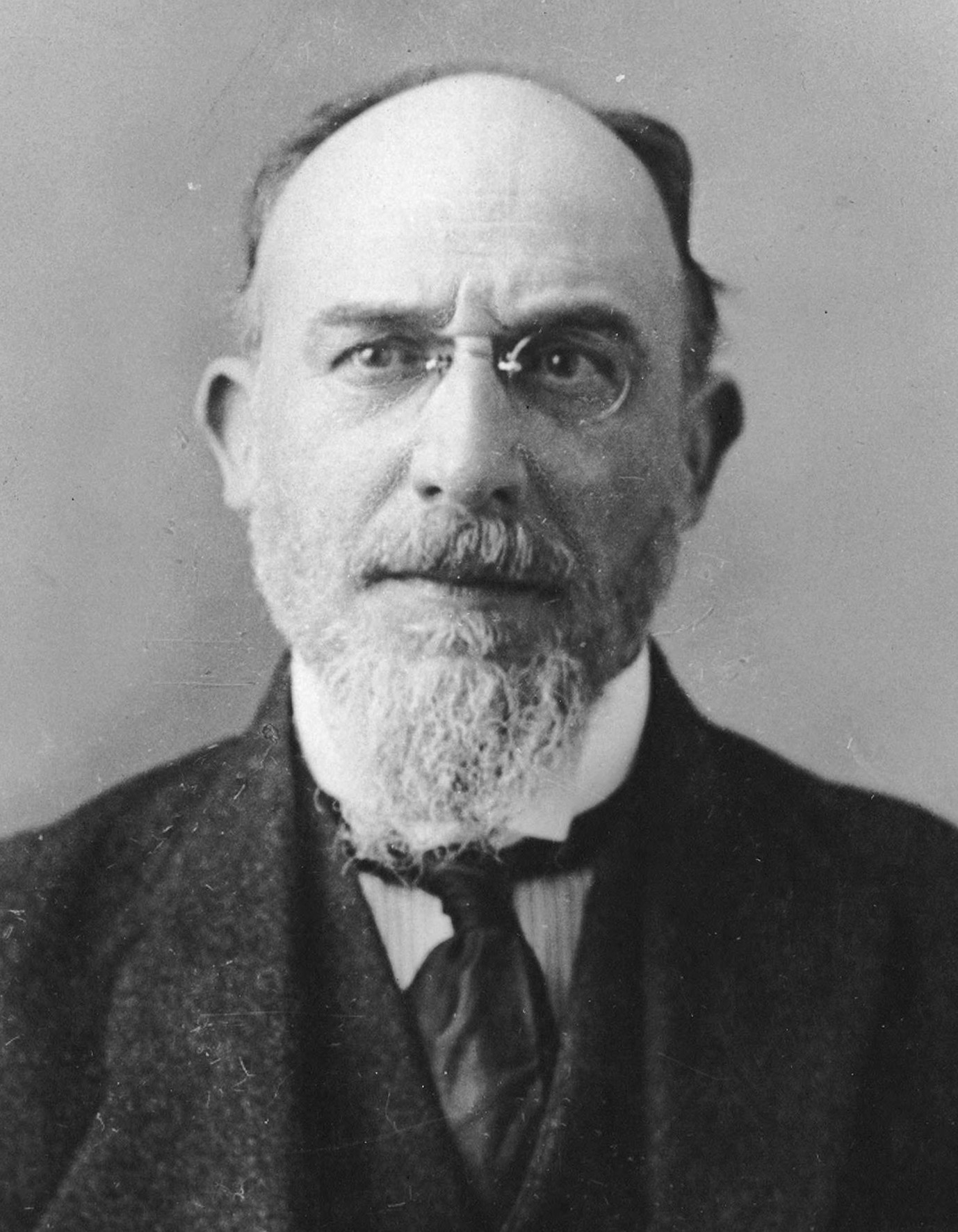
Satie, c. 1919

The Nocturnes are a set of five piano pieces (initially planned as a set of seven, but left unfinished) (Note: Satie planned to write at least seven nocturnes (with No. 4 serving as an "interlude" between two sets of three) based on material in the composer's notebooks at the Bibliothèque nationale de France, Paris.) by Erik Satie. They were written between August and November 1919. With the exception of the Premier Menuet (1920), they were his final works for solo piano, and are considered among his most significant achievements in the genre.

The Nocturnes stand apart from Satie's piano music of the 1910s in their complete seriousness—lacking the zany titles, musical parody, and extramusical texts that he typically featured in his scores of the time. The completed set of five nocturnes takes about 13 minutes to perform.

== Background ==
Much had transpired in Satie's personal and professional lives in the two years since his previous keyboard piece, the Neoclassical spoof Sonatine bureaucratique (1917). There was the fallout from the scandalous premiere of his ballet Parade (1917), (Note: "Parade separated me from a great many friends. This work is the cause of many misfortunes. I have against me a thousand unpleasant people who have more or less abused and mistreated me. Too bad!" Satie in a letter to Henry Prunières, dated 14 September 1917.) including his conviction of criminal libel (from which he narrowly escaped imprisonment) for sending insulting postcards to one of its critics, Jean Poueigh; his bitter estrangement from longtime friend Claude Debussy, and Debussy's subsequent death; and the completion of the work which he believed represented the best of himself: the "symphonic drama" Socrate (1918).

Ridiculed by the French press and dogged by chronic poverty, Satie fell into a depressed state that reached its nadir in August 1918, when he wrote to Valentine Hugo, "I shit on Art, it has 'cut me up' too often." (Note: Letter dated 23 August 1918.) He then proceeded to break with the Nouveaux jeunes group of musicians he had recently founded—an act that set the stage for their eventual regrouping as Les Six.

By the summer of 1919, his creative energies had revived, though his spirits remained hard-bitten and gloomy: "I have changed a lot during these last months", he mused to singer Paulette Darty. "I am becoming very serious...too serious, even." (Note: Letter dated 22 November 1919, around the time Satie completed Nocturne No. 5.) Such feelings may have steered him to the nocturne form itself—the province of Chopin, (Note: Satie greatly admired Chopin, referring to him as a "poet" and "prodigious creator" in his journalistic writings (e.g., his February 1923 Vanity Fair article on Stravinsky titled Igor Stravinsky). Myers, for one, found "Chopinesque" qualities in Nocturne No. 4. Satie would have also known the Nocturnes of Debussy, another fan of Chopin.) evocative of the night, and usually quiet and introspective—and affected the way in which the project developed.

== Composition ==
Satie's notebooks reveal that he initially intended to present the Nocturnes with the whimsical literary humor that the Parisian public had come to expect from him. The first piece had the working title Faux Nocturne and was accompanied by one of those little stories he enjoyed writing for the pianist's private amusement: (Note: From his manuscript, BNF 9609 (2) pp. 2–6, Bibliothèque nationale de France.)

The night is silent
Melancholy is all-pervasive
The will-o'-the-wisp disturbs the peaceful landscape
What a bore! It's an old will-o'-the-wisp
Trust him to come
Let us resume our reverie, if you will

But he soon abandoned the text and satirical nomenclature, choosing instead to let the Nocturnes stand as pure music. He also wrote them using conventional bar lines, a practice he had largely eschewed in piano music for nearly 30 years before returning to it—perhaps with a dash of irony—in his Sonatine bureaucratique.

On 24 August 1919, Satie informed Valentine Hugo: "I am coming to the end of my Third Nocturne. I am dedicating it to you. The three of them are not at all bad. The first serves as a prelude; the second is shorter and very tender—very nocturnal; the third, yours, is a more rapid and dramatic nocturne, a little longer than the first. Between the three of them they form a whole with which I am very pleased—though the first is the least good." This assessment was premature; Satie was not satisfied with Nocturne No. 2 until the following month, and he continued to tinker with No. 3 until October—by which time he was developing ideas for additional pieces in the series. Nos. 4 and 5 are dated October and November 1919, respectively.

== Publication and performance ==
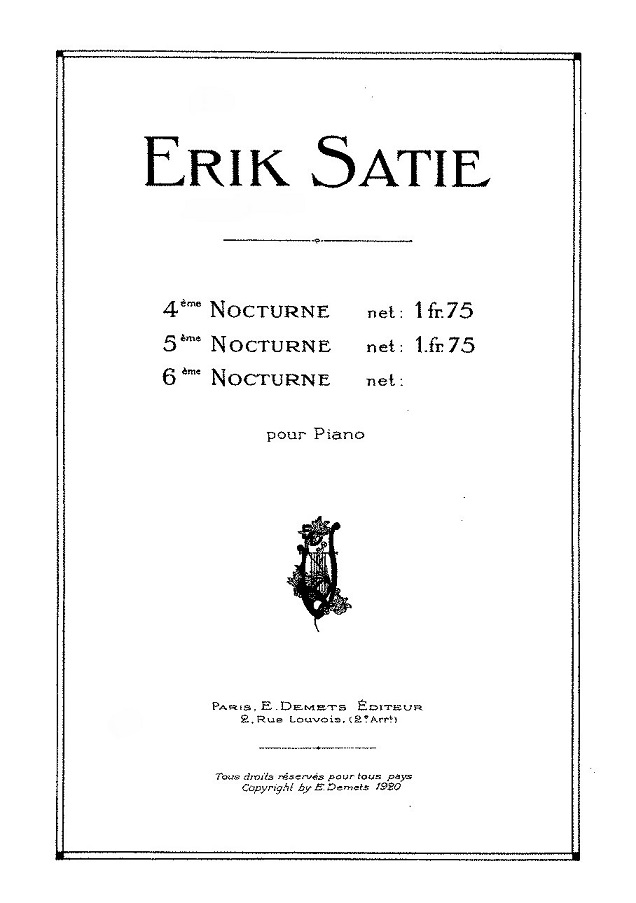
A 1920 advertisement for Satie's Nocturnes, including the projected No. 6, which Satie never completed or published.

The printing of the Nocturnes was split between two of Satie's regular publishers; Rouart, Lerolle & Cie. issued Nos. 1–3 in late 1919, and E. Demets published Nos. 4 and 5 in 1920. Demets also advertised a Nocturne No. 6 without a price, indicating it was a work in progress—but the piece would not appear in the composer's lifetime.

Satie dedicated each of the completed five to a patron or proponent of his music:

1. Doux et calme (Soft and calm), to Marcelle Meyer
2. Simplement (Simply), to André Salomon (Note: Salomon was a French-Jewish pianist and teacher associated with Satie's music of the World War I era, including performances of the musique d'ameublement ("furniture music"). He perished in the Nazi death camp at Auschwitz during World War II.)
3. Un peu mouvementé (A bit hectic), to Valentine Hugo
4. = 92, to Countess Étienne de Beaumont (Note: Édith de Beaumont (1877–1952), wife of Count Étienne de Beaumont, both of whom were among Satie's chief benefactors after World War I.)
5. . = 60, to Madame Georges Cocteau (Note: Eugénie Cocteau, née Lecomte (1855–1943), Jean Cocteau's mother.)

Nocturne No. 1 was premiered by Jane Mortier at the Salle Pleyel in Paris on 18 March 1920; Nos. 1–3 were performed by Ricardo Viñes during an all-Satie concert at the Salle Érard on 7 June 1920. Nocturne No. 4 was not heard until 4 January 1923, when it was played by Jean Wiener at the Théâtre des Champs-Élysées. Nocturne No. 5 was performed sometime in 1921 by Marcelle Meyer.

== Reception ==
The Nocturnes caused no immediate stir, although at the Viñes performance, Jean Cocteau and Les Six members Darius Milhaud and Louis Durey expressed their enthusiasm. Given Satie's reputation as a musical humorist, the audience may have been unsure if it was having its leg pulled. (Note: This same concert saw the premiere of Socrate in its version for chamber orchestra, and its second public performance overall. It overshadowed the Nocturnes, though for reasons that the composer found unwelcome. Satie was exasperated by critics who, refusing to take him seriously, imagined that Socrate was the driest musical "joke" he had ever perpetrated.) But they have long been prized by Satie aficionados. John Cage championed them in the United States after World War II, and they inspired choreographer Merce Cunningham's ballet Nocturnes (1956), in which the dances were created using chance procedure. Rollo Myers, Satie's first English-language biographer (1948), ranked the Nocturnes with a handful of Satie compositions that are "outstanding and cannot be ignored by any student of contemporary music." He continued: "The Nocturnes are in a sense the natural corollary of Socrate, which preceded them by a year, and are conceived in the same gravely austere mood. The style is chastened, simplified, uncompromising in its rejection of any sensuous appeal, but the music is strangely impressive in its bleakness and almost inhuman detachment."

The Nocturnes have never enjoyed the mainstream popularity of the Gymnopédies or other Satie piano works; although they have been recorded by such artists as Aldo Ciccolini, Pascal Rogé, and Jean-Yves Thibaudet, they remain—according to John Keillor's AllMusic review—"among the undiscovered masterpieces of the twentieth century."

== Posthumous Nocturnes ==
Shortly before his death in 1925, Satie told Robert Caby that the manuscript of his Nocturne No. 6 was virtually complete and might be published someday. Six decades later, musicologist Robert Orledge examined Satie's notebooks from the period and discovered a single, full draft of a piano piece, missing only two bars of the left-hand part. (Note: From his manuscript, BNF 9609 (2) pp. 15–18, Bibliothèque nationale de France.) Orledge completed a performance version, and it was published as Satie's Nocturne No. 6 in 1994. Speculative versions of a Nocturne No. 7, based on a 12-bar sketch in Satie's notebooks, (Note: From his manuscript, BNF 9609 (4) pp. 6–8, Bibliothèque nationale de France.) have been created by Orledge and others.

== Recordings ==
Artist	Nocturne(s)	Album	Label	Year
Aldo Ciccolini	Nos. 1–3	Piano Music of Erik Satie, Vol. 1	Angel Records	1968
Aldo Ciccolini	Nos. 4, 5	Piano Music of Erik Satie, Vol. 5	Angel Records	1971
Aldo Ciccolini	Nos. 1–5	Das Klavierwerk	His Master's Voice	1971
Frank Glazer	Nos. 1–5	Piano Music	Vox	1968
Jean-Joël Barbier	Nos. 1–5	Œuvres pour piano	Accord	1971
Yūji Takahashi	Nos. 1–5	L'oeuvre pour piano	Denon	1976
Daniel Varsano	No. 1	Œuvres pour piano	Columbia	1979
France Clidat	Nos. 1–3	Erik Satie	Forlane	1980
France Clidat	Nos. 1–5	L'œuvre pour piano	Forlane	1982
Klára Körmendi	Nos. 1–5	Piano Works Vol. 1	Naxos	1993
Bojan Gorišek	Nos. 1–5	Complete Piano Works Volume 7	Audiophile Classics	1995
Pascal Rogé	No. 4	3 Gymnopédies & Other Piano Works	Decca	1984
Pascal Rogé	Nos. 1–3, 5	Piano Works	Decca	1989
Pascal Rogé	Nos. 1–5	Après la pluie...	Decca	1995
Olof Höjer	Nos. 1–5	Olof Höjer Plays Erik Satie	Malmö Audio Production	1986
Olof Höjer	Nos. 1–6	The Complete Piano Music Vol. 6	Swedish Society Discofil	1999
Jean-Yves Thibaudet	Nos. 1–6	The Complete Solo Piano Music	Decca	2003
Cristina Ariagno	Nos. 1–6	Piano Works (Complete)	Brilliant Classics	2006
Satsuki Shibano	No. 4	Erik Satie	Sound Process	1984
Satsuki Shibano	Nos. 1, 4	Satsuki Plays Satie II	Firebird	1987
Satsuki Shibano	Nos. 1–6	Belle de nuit	Les Disques Des Chainons	2012
Alessandro Simonetto	Nos. 1–6	Children's Pieces, Sport et divertissements, Nocturnes & Other Late Pieces	OnClassical	2023
