= Sonatine bureaucratique =

Piano composition by Erik Satie

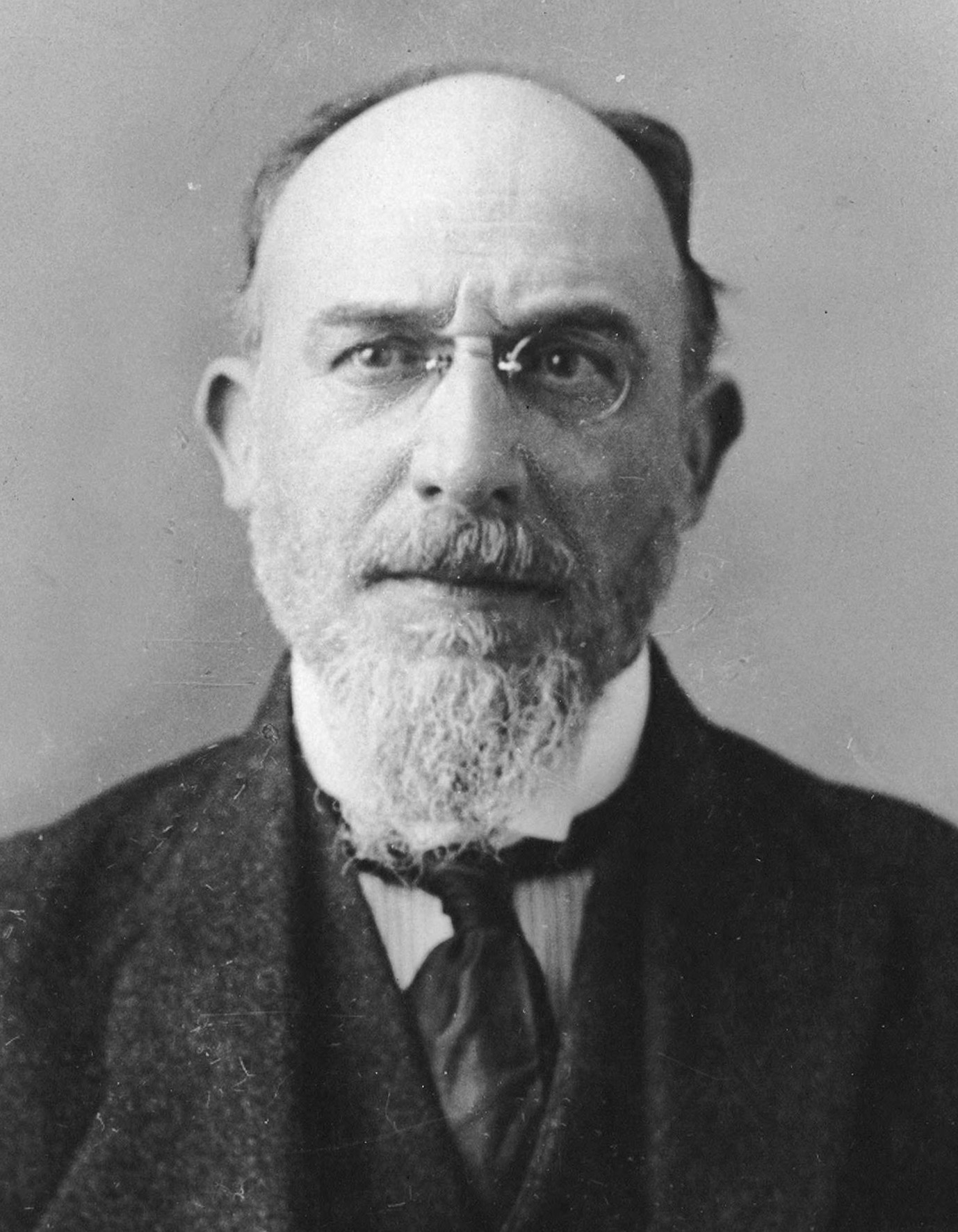
Erik Satie

The Sonatine bureaucratique (Bureaucratic sonatina) is a 1917 piano composition by Erik Satie. The final entry in his humoristic piano music of the 1910s, it is Satie's only full-scale parody of a single musical work: the Sonatina Op. 36 N° 1 (1797) by Muzio Clementi. In performance it lasts around 4 minutes.

Satie's modern, irreverent reinterpretations of 18th Century music in this little pastiche have been hailed as a notable forerunner of Neoclassicism, a trend that would dominate Western concert hall music in the years between the World Wars.

== Music and texts ==
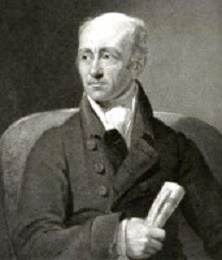
Muzio Clementi

Satie's sonatina, even shorter than Clementi's example, was composed in July 1917 and published the same year. The composition is in three tiny movements, of which the last one exposes some pseudo-development: the motifs of the first half of that movement are rearranged in another sequence by way of "development section", or rather as the imitation of development.

From a formal point of view the sonatina is Satie's most outspoken neoclassical composition. It is one of the exceptional piano compositions he wrote down with bar lines, which he probably would not have done if not for making an explicit reference to classicism.

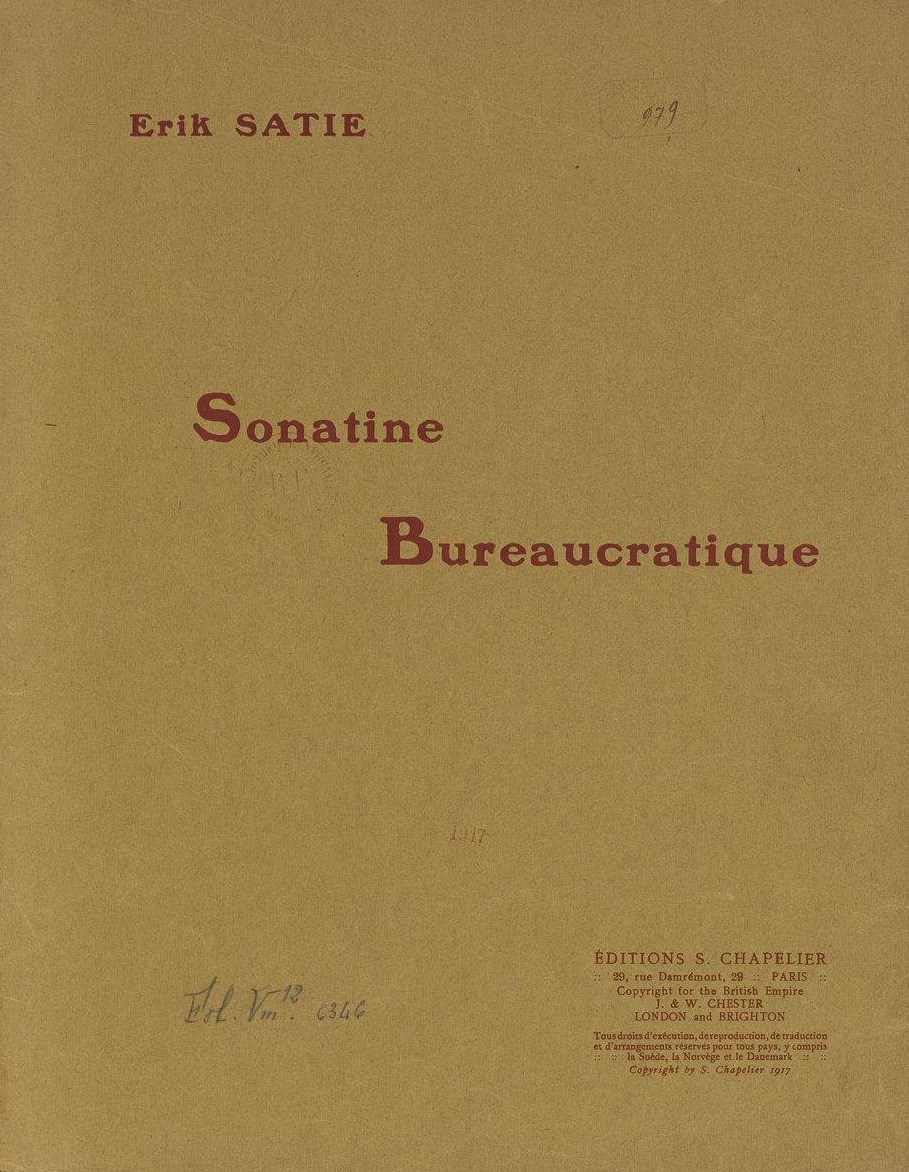
Sonatine bureaucratique, cover of the original 1917 edition

Satie would write a "neo-classical" composition a few months after the succès de scandale of Parade. Satie was on friendly terms with Stravinsky from 1911, and after the latter had had his own succès de scandale with The Rite of Spring in 1913 (premiered with the same Ballets Russes), he also moved towards neoclassicism – although for Stravinsky there was no distinct neoclassical composition published before Satie's sonatina.

The partition is full of funny remarks: for example, the final movement is called "Vivache" instead of the original Vivace ("vache" being French for "cow"). Satie directs at least part of the fun at himself: the sourd muet ("deaf-mute") from Lower Brittany, allegedly having provided the "Peruvian air" that forms the first theme of the last movement, is Satie himself. The sonatina can also be seen as the composition with which Satie concluded his series of "funny" three-part solo piano compositions, which he had begun in 1911.

== Premiere and reception ==
Satie dedicated the Sonatine bureaucratique "with friendship" to the gifted young pianist Juliette Méerovitch (1896-1920), who gave its first public performance at the Salle Huyghens in Paris on December 1, 1917. A student of Alfred Cortot, Méerovitch won first prize in piano at the Paris Conservatoire in 1911 and was a vigorous champion of modern French music. She had previously teamed with Satie for the concert premiere of his ballet Parade in its piano 4-hands version in July 1917, the same month he wrote his sonatina. Author Jean Cocteau nicknamed her "The Piano Tamer" and future Les Six members Germaine Tailleferre, Francis Poulenc and Louis Durey dedicated works to her. Méerovitch's sudden death at 24 (from an intestinal ailment) was widely lamented in the French music scene. Pianist Marcelle Meyer would take Méerovitch's place as Satie's favorite interpreter of his keyboard music during his last years.

The sonatina represents what biographer Steven Moore Whiting called "the culmination and also the end of Satie's humoristic piano music." His final compositions for that instrument, the Nocturnes (1919) and Premier Menuet (1920), were much more serious in tone.

Satie's early biographers acknowledged the Sonatine bureaucratique as a precursor of Neoclassical music, but were otherwise unimpressed with the piece. Pierre-Daniel Templier (1932) relegated it to a footnote in his book, while Rollo H. Myers (1948) thought it was "not remarkable musically except as a fairly successful but unexciting pastiche". Since then, however, it has become one of Satie's more frequently performed and recorded works.

== Recordings ==
Frank Glazer (Vox, 1968), Jean-Joël Barbier (Universal Classics France, 1971), Aldo Ciccolini (twice for EMI, 1971 and 1988), John McCabe (Saga, 1974), Daniel Varsano (CBS, 1979), Yūji Takahashi (Denon, 1979), Werner Bärtschi (Ex Libris, 1981), France Clidat (Forlane, 1982), Cordélia Canabrava Arruda (Fermata, 1983), Pascal Rogé (London, 1984), Roland Pöntinen (Bis, 1986), Gerhard Erber (Eterna, 1987), Anne Queffélec (Virgin Classics Digital, 1988), Yitkin Seow (Hyperion, 1989), Gabriel Tacchino (Disques Pierre Verany, 1989), Peter Dickinson (Conifer, 1992), Michel Legrand (Erato Records, 1993), Klára Koermendi (Naxos, 1993), Bojan Gorišek (Audiophile Classics, 1994), Jean-Pierre Armengaud (Mandala, 1996), Olof Höjer (Swedish Society Discofil, 1996), Andrea Tedesco (New Tone Records, 1996), Jean-Yves Thibaudet (Decca, 2001), Marcela Roggeri (Transart Live, 2005), Cristina Ariagno (Brilliant Classics, 2006), Stephanie McCallum (ABC Classics, 2007), Jeroen van Veen (Brilliant Classics, 2016), Noriko Ogawa (Bis, 2016).
