= Accord =

Accord may refer to:

== Businesses and products ==
- Honda Accord, a car manufactured by the Honda Motor Company
- Accord (cigarette), a brand of Rothmans, Benson & Hedges
- Accord (company), a former public services provider in south England
- Accord Healthcare, a subsidiary of Intas Pharmaceuticals
- Accord (French record label)
- Accord (Polish record label)

== Organizations ==
- Accord (Nigeria), a political party
- Accord (trade union), a British trade union
- Accord Coalition, a coalition of groups and individuals advocating for reform of faith schools in Britain

== Geography ==
- Accord, New York, United States, a hamlet and census-designated place
- Accord Pond, a reservoir in Massachusetts, United States

== Other uses ==
- Accord, a series of media publications by Conciliation Resources, a peace organization based in London
- Accord and satisfaction, a concept in contract law
- Clark Accord (1961–2011), Surinamese–Dutch author and makeup artist
- Ms. Accord, a Puyo Puyo video game character
- Prices and Incomes Accord, agreement between unions and government of Australia to achieve price stability (1983–1996)

== See also ==
- Accord Metropolitan Hotel, Chennai, Tamil Nadu, India
- Acord
- Peace
