= Acord =

Acord is a surname. Notable people with the surname include:

- Art Acord (1890–1931), American silent film actor and rodeo champion
- Bobby R. Acord, American government official
- David Acord, American sound editor and voice actor
- Lance Acord (born 1964), American cinematographer

== See also ==
- Accord (disambiguation)
- ACORD
