= Thierry Pécou =

French composer (born 1965)

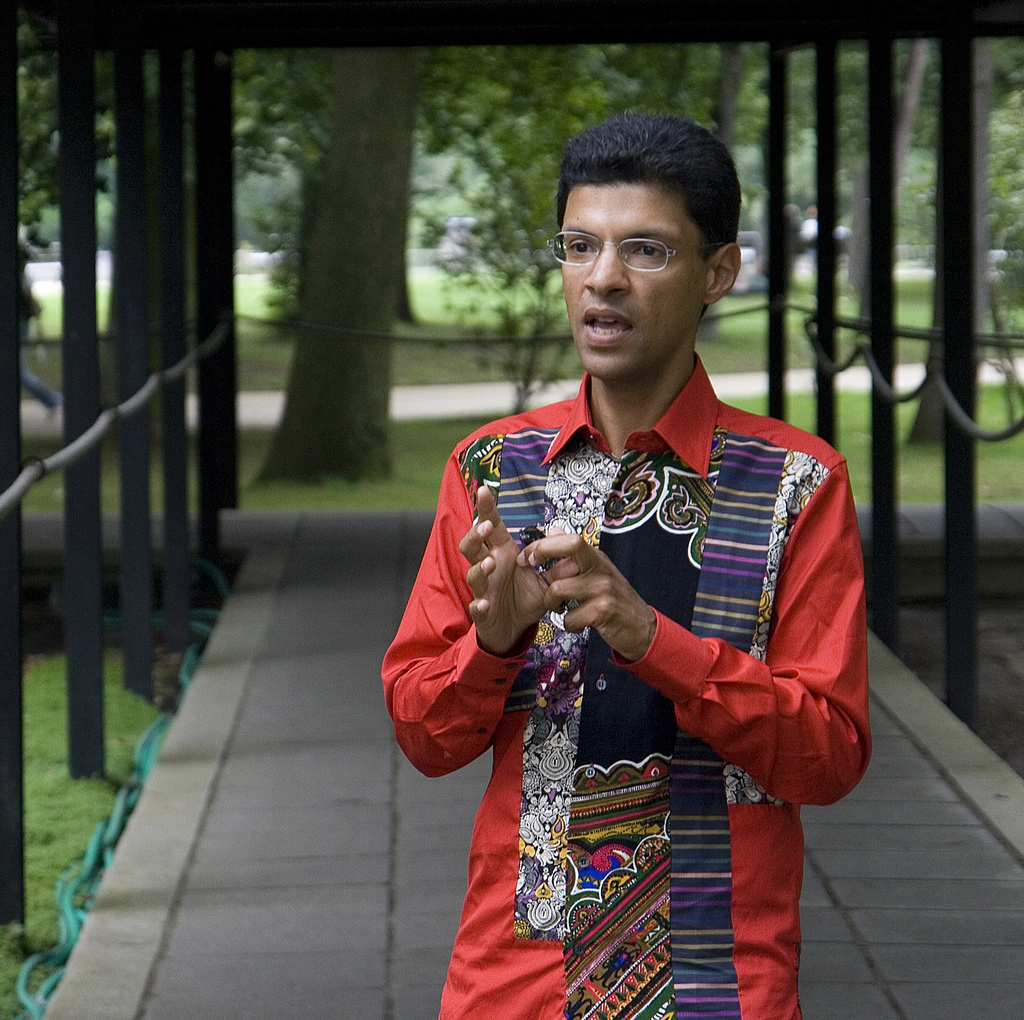
Thierry Pécou

Thierry Pécou (born 1965 in Boulogne-Billancourt) is a modern French composer.

== Works ==
- L'homme armé
- Le Tombeau de Marc-Antoine Charpentier pour 3 chœurs à voix égales, orgue baroque, basse de viole, positif et cloches (1995) [2]
- A Circle in the Sand (2001) for solo violin and choir, commissioned and premiered by Madeleine Mitchell (violin) and the Joyful Company of Singers with funding from Arts Council England, at the Bath International Music Festival July 2001
- L'Oiseau innumérable – recording by Alexandre Tharaud and the Ensemble Orchestral de Paris, dir. Andrea Quinn, on Harmonia Mundi
- Symphonie du Jaguar – Ensemble Zellig's recording on Harmonia Mundi was awarded the Diapason d'Or 2010 in the contemporary category.
