= Premier Menuet =

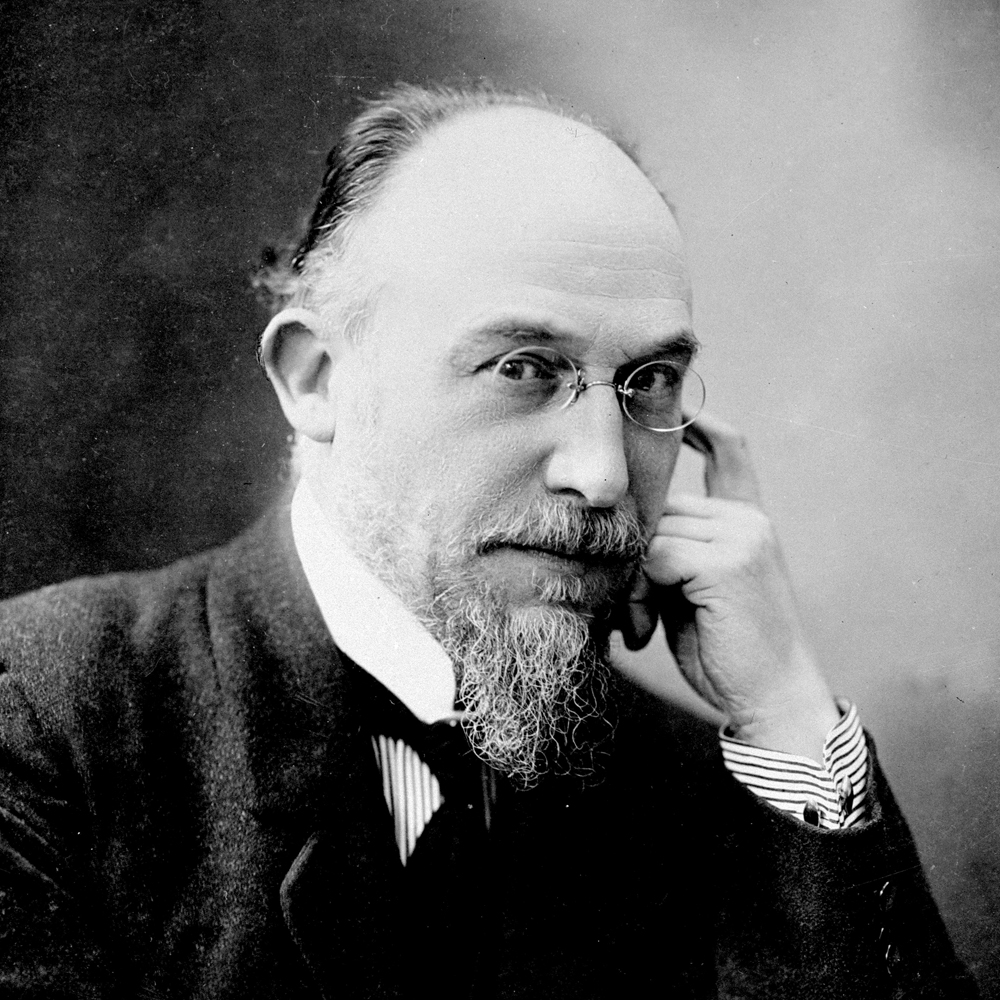
Erik Satie

The Premier Menuet (First Minuet) is a Neoclassical piano piece by Erik Satie. Written in June 1920, it was his last composition for solo piano. It was published by Les Éditions de La Sirène in 1921.

== Description ==
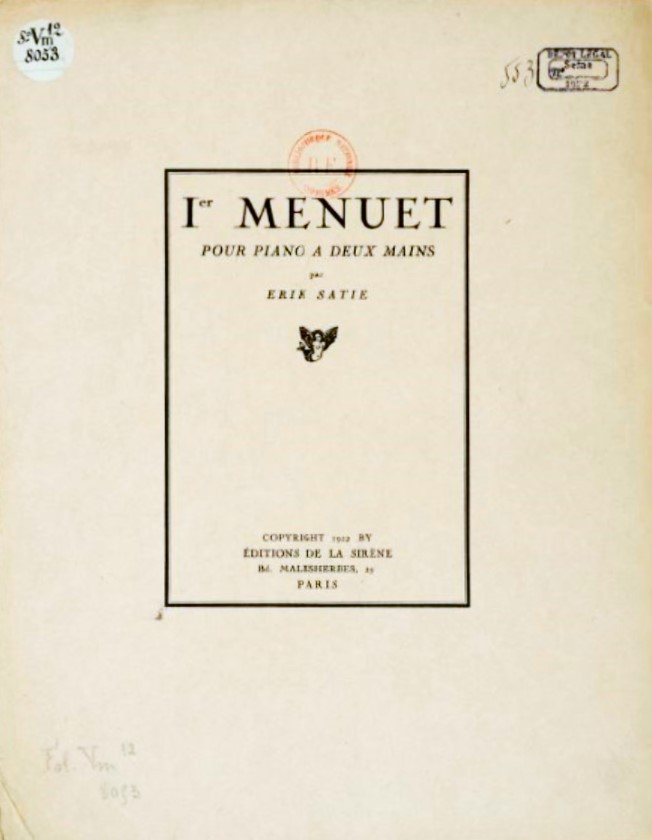
Cover of the original edition (1921) of Satie's Premier Menuet

The piece was inspired by the minuet, a stately dance popular in the 17th and 18th centuries. In 1909, during his period studying at the Schola Cantorum, Satie produced a handful of unpublished minuet exercises with offbeat titles such as Le prisonnier maussade (The Sullen Prisoner) and Le grand singe (The Big Ape). When he returned to the form a decade later he studied Mozart minuets in preparation. The finished work bears the outward trappings of its classical antecedents - 3/4 time and ABA structure, with the B section imitating a trio - though it avoids traditional development and is subjected to Satie's characteristic unexpected harmonic progressions. Unlike his previous Neoclassical keyboard work the Sonatine bureaucratique (1917), there are no elements of pastiche or parody in the Menuet; instead it reflects the sober, abstract style of his 1919 Nocturnes.

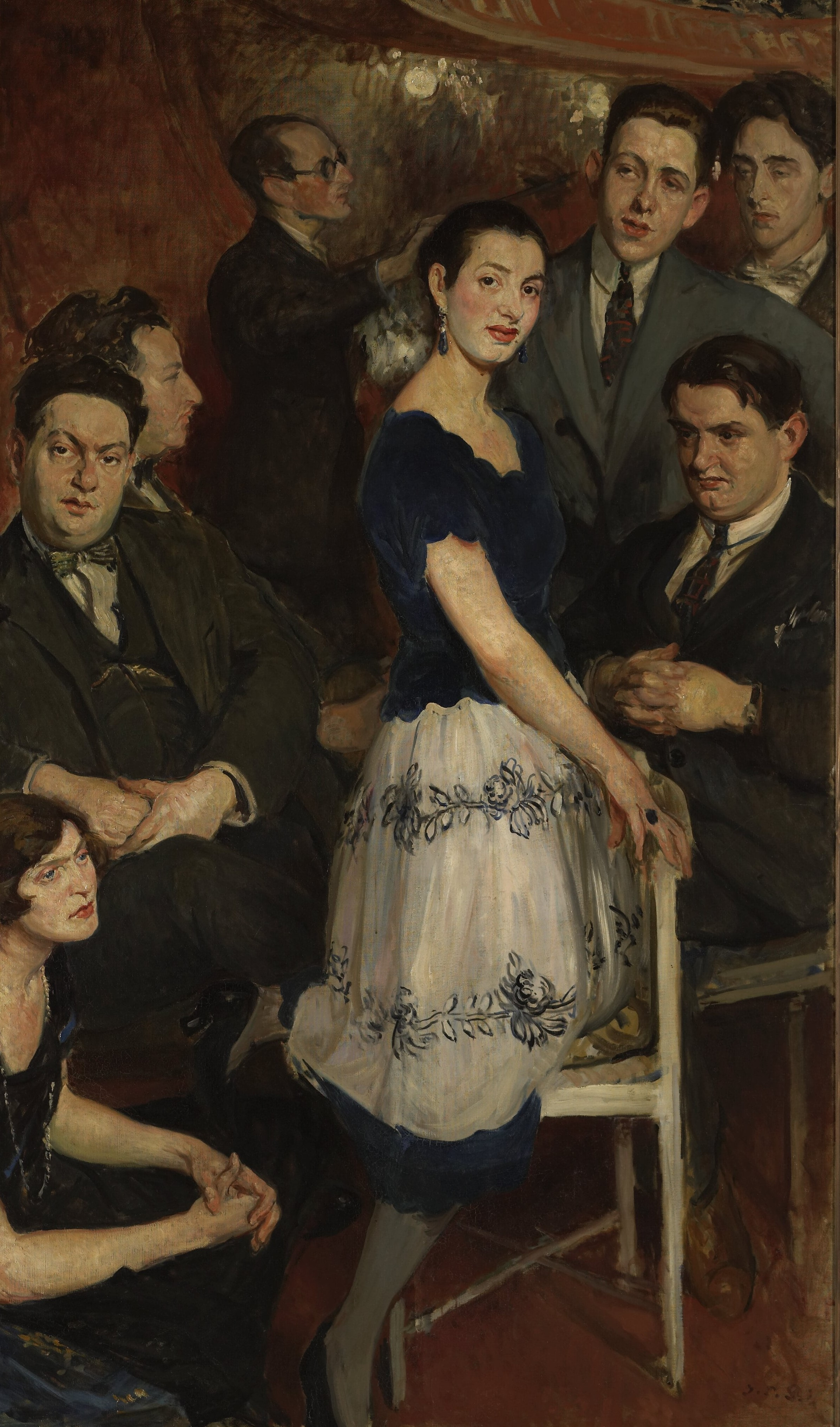
A 1921 group portrait of pianist Marcelle Meyer (center), Jean Cocteau (top right), and the members of Les Six

The Premier Menuet was premiered by Marcelle Meyer in Paris on January 17, 1922, on a program that also featured the Gymnopédie No. 1, Sonatine bureaucratique, Part I of Socrate, and works by Byrd, Monteverdi, Bach, Rameau, Couperin, Domenico Scarlatti, Pergolesi, Gluck, and Mozart. The occasion was the first of three concerts that month in which Meyer presented Satie's music in historical contexts, from the early clavecin masters to the contemporary avant-garde. In his introductory talk for the first program Satie recited a list of the other composers' ages ("Byrd and Rameau...died in the grip of old age...They were 81 years old - each, of course...") before noting that he wrote his Menuet "while I was still quite young - 54 years old."

It is dedicated to Claude Duboscq (1897-1938), one of many young French composers Satie encouraged during and after World War I. He was a former student of the Schola Cantorum and specialized in religious music.

The Premier Menuet has been mentioned along with Socrate and the Nocturnes as representing a short-lived phase (1918 to 1920) in Satie's later output that owed nothing at all to humor, to which may be added the song Elégie (in memory of Debussy) from his Quatre petites melodies (1920). As its title suggests there is no evidence Satie intended it as a conscious farewell to piano music, his primary medium for most of his creative life. His last years were occupied mainly with theatre music in a more popular satirical vein, though he continued to pursue the objective musical language developed in these works.

== Recordings ==
Pianist Aldo Ciccolini recorded the Menuet twice, and there are notable recordings by Jean-Joël Barbier, Olof Höjer, Steffen Schleiermacher, Jean-Yves Thibaudet, and Billy Eidi. In 2007 Michel Rondeau published a chamber arrangement for flute, oboe, clarinet, bassoon and horn.
