= Accord (Polish record label) =

Polish classical music label

CD Accord Music Edition is a Polish classical music label, based in Warsaw and founded in 1995.

The label won the Grammy Award for Best Classical Compendium in 2012, for Antoni Wit's recordings Fonogrammi; Horn Concerto; The Awakening of Jacob; Anaklasis produced by Aleksandra Nagórko and Andrzej Sasin.

The label has in the past had some cooperation with Accord (French record label) as for example the motets of Andreas Hakenberger, released on Accord France and Accord Poland.
