= Bobby R. Acord =

American admin

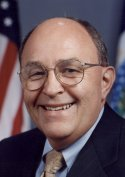
- Acord in 2001 or 2002

Bobby R. Acord was the Administrator of the USDA's Animal and Plant Health Inspection Service (APHIS). He was appointed by Ann Veneman on November 7, 2001, and was no longer administrator as of 2004.

Prior to his appointment, he had served for over a decade in the upper echelons of APHIS as:

- APHIS' Acting Administrator since September 2001
- Associate Administrator since 1999
- Deputy Administrator for APHIS' Wildlife Services program for nearly a decade prior

Acord has received two Presidential Rank Awards for his contributions to the USDA. He holds a Bachelor of Science degree in animal science from West Virginia University in Morgantown.
