= Accord (French record label) =

- Parent company: Universal Music France
- Founded: 1995
- Country of origin: France

Accord is a French classical record label, and the main classical imprint of Universal Music France. The brand originally belonged in France to Musidisc, founded in 1995, which incorporated the labels Accord, Adès, Disc AZ, Adda, Vega, Le Club Français du Disque, Sofrason. When Polygram acquired Musidisc in 1999 it began to use the label Accord for releases of Decca France, and for the Euterp series of the Orchestra of Montpellier.

For the Polish label CD Accord see Accord (Polish record label)
