= Ricardo Viñes =

Spanish pianist

Ricardo Viñes y Roda
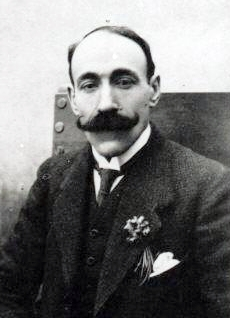
- Ricardo Viñes in 1919

Background information
- Born: Ricardo Viñes y Roda (Spanish); Ricard Viñes i Roda (Catalan); Lleida, Spain
- Died: April 29, 1943 (aged 68)
- Genres: Impressionism
- Instrument: Piano
- Years active: 1895-1943

Ricardo Viñes y Roda (Spanish pronunciation: [riˈkaɾðo ˈβiɲes], Catalan: Ricard Viñes i Roda, Catalan pronunciation: [riˈkaɾd ˈbiɲəs]; 5 February 1875 – 29 April 1943) was a Spanish pianist. He gave the premieres of various works by Ravel, Debussy, Satie, Falla and Albéniz. He was the piano teacher of the composer Francis Poulenc and the pianists Marcelle Meyer, Joaquín Nin-Culmell and Léo-Pol Morin.

== Life and career ==
Viñes was born in Lleida, Spain. He studied the piano at the Paris Conservatoire under Charles-Wilfrid de Bériot, and composition and harmony with Benjamin Godard and Albert Lavignac.

In 1895 Viñes made his début at the Salle Pleyel, Paris. From 1900 he had an international career, touring in Russia and throughout Europe and South America. Between 1930 and 1936 he lived in Argentina, returning to Paris in 1936.

In Paris, he resumed a high-intensity schedule, introducing the work of the younger generation of French composers, such as Germaine Tailleferre and René Leibowitz, among others. In 1940, he settled in Barcelona after a tour of Spain, but the Second World War and the German occupation of Paris prevented him from returning to the French capital, leaving him isolated from the musical circuit and living a very precarious life, sustained by the few concerts he could give in a post-war country, supplemented by lessons and bolstered by the help of his friends.

According to Charles Timbrell and Esperanza Berrocal in the Grove Dictionary of Music and Musicians, Viñes's keyboard technique was magnificent and his repertoire extensive. In addition to the established classics he championed new works by the many composers of whom he was a close friend. They included Ravel, Debussy, Satie, Falla, Granados, Albéniz and Déodat de Séverac. He was also a proponent of Russian music, and introduced France to pieces by Mussorgsky (Pictures at an Exhibition), Balakirev (Islamey) and Prokofiev (Sarcasmes). Grove lists among the many works dedicated to him Ravel's Oiseaux tristes, Debussy's Poissons d’or and Falla's Noches en los jardines de España. (Note: José Cubiles was chosen as soloist for the 1916 premiere of the Falla piece in Madrid, but Viñes played it at its first performance outside Madrid, in San Sebastián, shortly afterwards.)

Viñes composed a small number of works, the best known of which are the two Hommages, for Séverac and Satie. He also wrote several articles, mostly on Spanish music, and his diaries are much quoted by biographers of his musical contemporaries. His piano students included Marcelle Meyer, Joaquín Nin-Culmell, Léo-Pol Morin and Francis Poulenc. Poulenc later said of his teacher:

I admired him madly, because, at this time, in 1914, he was the only virtuoso who played Debussy and Ravel. That meeting with Viñes was paramount in my life: I owe him everything. … In reality it is to Viñes that I owe my fledgling efforts in music and everything I know about the piano. Viñes was a delightful character, some kind of strange Hidalgo with an enormous moustache, a brown sombrero in true Barcelona style, and button boots with which he used to kick me in the shins whenever I was clumsy at the pedals. No one could teach the art of using the pedals, an essential feature of modern piano music, better than Viñes. He somehow managed to extract clarity precisely from the ambiguities of the pedals. His staccato playing was equally remarkable. Marcelle Meyer, his most brilliant pupil, declared that he made even Petrushka seem easy.

Viñes died in Barcelona at the age of 68. He was unmarried.

An annual International piano competition "Ricard Viñes" has been held since 1995 in his birth town Lleida. The city council named one of the city's most popular squares the "Plaça Ricard Vinyes", and the main room of the Llotja de Lleida theatre and congress centre (opened in 2010) is also named after him.

== Discography ==
Viñes reportedly had an intense dislike for the recording process, but nonetheless left 25 recordings dating from the 1930s. In Grove's view, the playing as recorded reveals "an unforced virtuosity, charming rhythmic pointing and shimmering pedal effects."

All the recordings listed below were released by Marston Records in 2007 as "Ricardo Viñes: The Complete Recordings". Other releases are listed below the individual compositions.

- Isaac Albéniz
  - Granada (Serenata), Op.47 No.1 (rec. 1930)
  - Torre bermeja, Op.92 No.12 (rec. 1930)
    - Opal (Pearl), "Ricardo Viñes and Francis Planté", 1994
  - Orientale, Op.232 No.2 (rec. 1930)
    - Opal (Pearl), "Ricardo Viñes and Francis Planté", 1994
  - Seguidillas, Op.232 No.5 (rec. 1930)
    - Opal (Pearl), "Ricardo Viñes and Francis Planté", 1994
  - Serenata española, Op.181 (rec. 22 July 1936)
    - Opal (Pearl), "Ricardo Viñes and Francis Planté", 1994
  - Tango in A minor, Op.164 No.2 (rec. 22 July 1936)
    - Opal (Pearl), "Ricardo Viñes and Francis Planté", 1994
- Pedro Humberto Allende
  - Dos Tonadas Chilenas (rec. 22 July 1936)
    - Opal (Pearl), "Ricardo Viñes and Francis Planté", 1994
- Manuel Blancafort
  - L'Orgue du Carroussel (from Le Parc d'Attractions) (rec. 1930)
    - Opal (Pearl), "Ricardo Viñes and Francis Planté", 1994
  - Polka de l'Equilibriste (from Le Parc d'Attractions) (rec. 1930)
    - Opal (Pearl), "Ricardo Viñes and Francis Planté", 1994
- Alexander Borodin
  - Scherzo in Ab (rec. 1930)
    - Opal (Pearl), "Ricardo Viñes and Francis Planté", 1994
- Claude Debussy
  - Soirée dans Grenade (Estampes No.2) (rec. 1930)
    - Opal (Pearl), "Ricardo Viñes and Francis Planté", 1994
  - Poissons d'or (Images, Set 2 No.3) (rec. 1930)
    - Opal (Pearl), "Ricardo Viñes and Francis Planté", 1994
    - Naxos, "A-Z of Pianists - by Jonathan Summers", 4-CD set, 2007
    - Ysaÿe Records, "Claude Debussy - Images Pour Piano", 2008
  - Hommage à Rameau (Images, Set 1 No.2) (incomplete; rec. 1938)
    - Arbiter Records, "Masters of the French piano tradition", 2007
  - Etude No.10, "Pour les sonorités opposées" (incomplete; rec. 1938)
    - Arbiter Records, "Masters of the French piano tradition", 2007
  - Viñes speaks on Debussy (radio address in French commemorating the 20th anniversary of Debussy's death, 1938)
- Manuel de Falla
  - Dance of Terror (rec. 1930)
  - Récit du Pêcheur (rec. 1930)
  - Introduction and Ritual Fire Dance (rec. 1930)
- Gluck-Brahms
  - Gavotte in A (rec. 1930)
    - Opal (Pearl), "Ricardo Viñes and Francis Planté", 1994
- Carlos López-Buchardo
  - Bailecito (rec. 22 July 1936)
    - Opal (Pearl), "Ricardo Viñes and Francis Planté", 1994
- Domenico Scarlatti
  - Sonata in D, K.29 (L.461) (rec. 1930)
    - Opal (Pearl), "Ricardo Viñes and Francis Planté", 1994
- Cayetano Troiani
  - Milonga (rec. 22 July 1936)
    - Opal (Pearl), "Ricardo Viñes and Francis Planté", 1994
- Joaquín Turina
  - Miramar (from Chants d'Espagne) (rec. 1930)
    - Opal (Pearl), "Ricardo Viñes and Francis Planté", 1994
  - Dans les Jardins de Murcia (rec. 1930)
    - Opal (Pearl), "Ricardo Viñes and Francis Planté", 1994

== Sources ==
- Hell, Henri (1959). Francis Poulenc. New York: Grove Press. OCLC 1268174.
- Poulenc, Francis (1978). Audel, Stéphane (ed.). My Friends and Myself. Translated by Harding, James. London: Dennis Dobson. ISBN 0234772514.
- Schmidt, Carl (2001). Entrancing Muse: A Documented Biography of Francis Poulenc. Hillsdale, NY: Pendragon Press. ISBN 1576470261.
