= Alexandre Tharaud =

French pianist (born 1968)

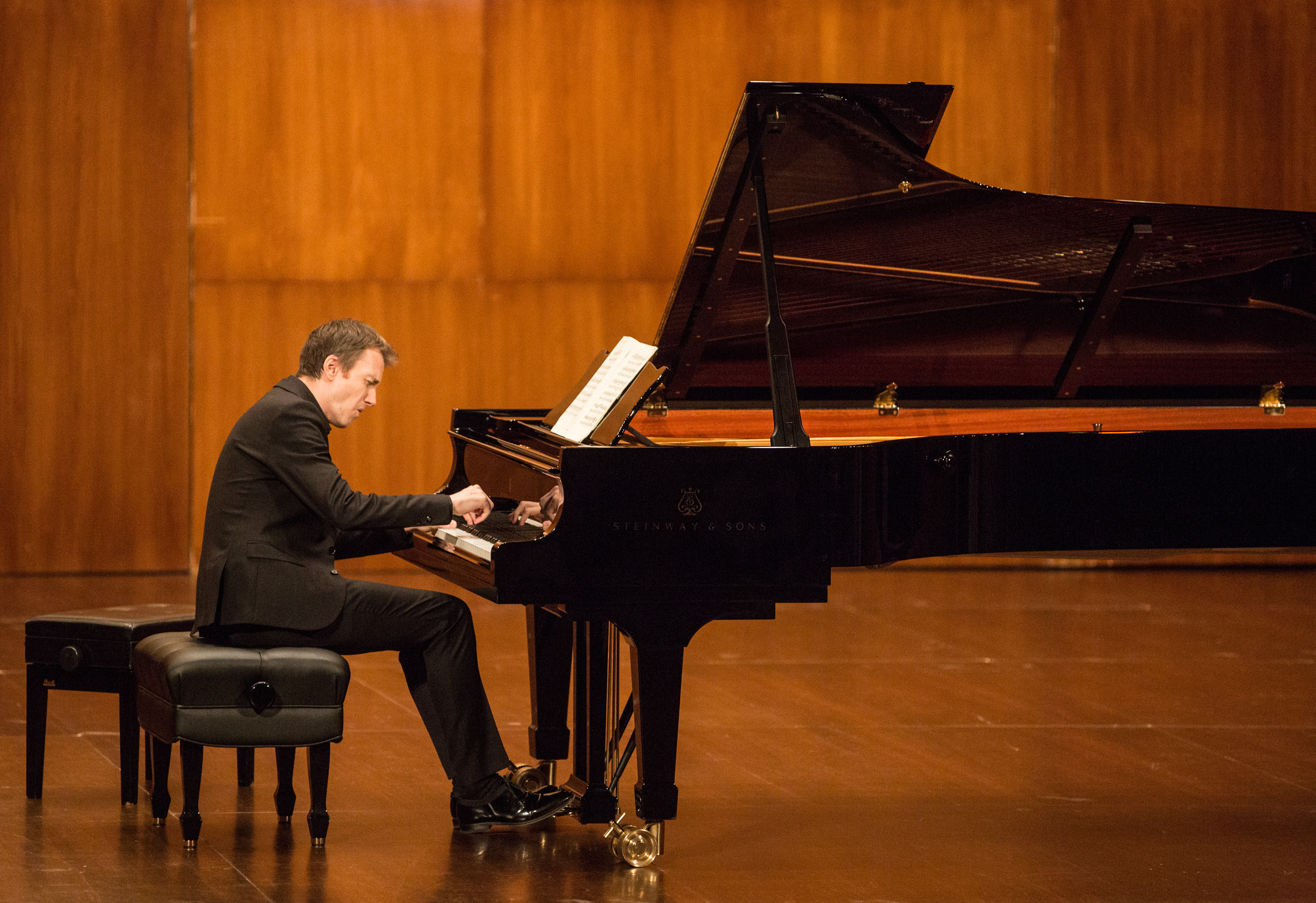
Tharaud performing in 2018

Alexandre Charles Martial Tharaud (born 9 December 1968) is a French pianist. He is active on the concert stage and has released a large and diverse discography.

== Life and career ==
Born in Paris, Tharaud discovered the music scene through his mother who was a dance teacher at the Opéra de Paris, and his father, an amateur director and singer of operettas. Tharaud thus appeared as a child in theatres around northern France, where the family spent many weekends. His grandfather was a violinist in Paris in the 1920s and 1930s.

At the initiative of his parents, Tharaud began piano studies at the age of five, and he entered the conservatoire of the 14th arrondissement, where his teacher was Carmen Taccon-Devenat, a student of Marguerite Long.

He entered the Conservatoire de Paris at the age of 14 where he won first prize for piano in the class of Germaine Mounier when he was 17 years old. With Theodor Paraskivesco, he mastered the piano, and he sought and received advice from Claude Helffer, Leon Fleisher and Nikita Magaloff. In 1987, he won third prize at the Maria Canals International Competition in Barcelona and, a year later, the Senigallia Competition in Italy. In 1989, he was awarded 2nd prize at the ARD International Music Competition in Munich. His career developed quickly in Europe as well as in North America and Japan.

In 2009, he took part in a show devoted to Erik Satie with actor François Morel. Alongside the singer Juliette, he organised a Satie Day at the Cité de la musique, recorded for France Télévisions. He has also worked with the French composer Thierry Pécou, performing the première of his first piano concerto in October 2006 at the Théâtre des Champs-Élysées and later recording it.

In 2012, Tharaud appeared in a minor role in the film Amour by Michael Haneke where he played himself, alongside Jean-Louis Trintignant, Emmanuelle Riva and Isabelle Huppert, although he said that it would not be the start of a film career for him.

The New York Times described his Bach playing at a recital in 2005 as "crisply articulated and vividly etched".

In 2015 Tharaud starred as the central performer at the Prinsengrachtconcert in Amsterdam.

Following Piano intime: conversations avec Nicolas Southon (Philippe Rey, 2013), in 2017 Tharaud published a second book entitled Montrez-moi vos mains (Show me your hands) (Grasset, 2017), in which he recounts his career, methods of working, relationships with colleagues, variations in audiences around the world, and his personal feelings about a musician's life.

== Method of work ==
Tharaud refuses to keep a piano in his residence because he believes he would begin to prefer the pleasure of improvisation to the necessity of rigorous work. He practises on different instruments at friends' residences. He composes, but usually privately.

Before each recording, he lays flowers at the tomb of Emmanuel Chabrier at Montparnasse Cemetery. When asked what a camera would record at his recording sessions, he replied that he sings, shouts, dances, and argues with the piano ("absurd behaviour"—comportements ridicules).

== Awards ==
- Commander of the Order of Arts and Letters (2016)

== Discography ==
- Bach, Italian Concertos, Harmonia Mundi, 2005
- Bach, Keyboard concertos, Virgin Classics, 2011
- Emmanuel Chabrier, Complete works for piano, Arion, 2007
- Chopin, Préludes opus 28, Harmonia Mundi, 2008
- Chopin, Journal intime, Virgin Classics, 2009
- Chopin, Intégrale des valses, Harmonia Mundi, 2010
- Couperin, Tic toc choc, Harmonia Mundi, 2007
- Grieg, Lyric pieces, Disques Dante, 1993
- Kagel, Æon, 2003; re-issued, Rewind, 2012
- Milhaud, Saudades do Brazil, La muse ménagère, L'album de Madame Bovary (with Madeleine Milhaud), Naxos
- Thierry Pécou, Outre-mémoire, with the ensemble Zellig, Æon
- Thierry Pécou, l'Oiseau innumérable, Harmonia Mundi, 2008
- Poulenc, survey of the chamber music (Sextet, Sonatas with piano for oboe, flute, violin, clarinet, cello), Trio for Oboe, Bassoon and Piano, works for two pianos and piano four hands, Le Bal masqué (with Franck Leguérinel, baritone), L'histoire de Babar (French version with François Mouzaya; English version with Natasha Emerson), L'Invitation au Château and Léocadia (with Danielle Darrieux)) for Naxos France
- Poulenc, Debussy, Complete works for cello and piano, with Jean-Guihen Queyras, Harmonia Mundi, 2008
- Poulenc, Pièces pour piano, Arion, 2008
- Rameau, Suites en la et en sol, Harmonia Mundi, 2001
- Ravel, Complete works for piano, Harmonia Mundi, 2003
- Satie, Avant-dernières pensées, Harmonia Mundi, 2009
- Scarlatti, Alexandre Tharaud plays Scarlatti, Virgin Classics, 2011
- Franz Schubert, Moments Musicaux, Sonatas D. 664 and D. 783, Arion, 2000
- Schubert, Divertissement à la hongroise, with Zhu Xiao-Mei, Harmonia Mundi, 2003
- Schubert, Arpeggione Sonata, with Jean-Guihen Queyras, Harmonia Mundi, 2006
- Schubert, complete works for piano four-hands, with Zhu Xiao-Mei
- Autograph (2013)
- Boulez, Messiaen, Jolivet, Dutilleux, Varèse, Musique du XXe pour flûte et piano, with Philippe Bernold, Harmonia Mundi, 2008
- Soundtrack of the film Amour (film by Michael Haneke). Franz Schubert, Beethoven, Bach. Virgin Classics, 2012
- Milhaud, Le Bœuf sur le toit. With Juliette, Madeleine Peyroux, Natalie Dessay, Bénabar, Guillaume Gallienne, Jean Delescluse, Frank Braley. Virgin Classics, 2012
- Satie, Discoveries (27 new works discovered by Sato Matsui and James Nye), Erato, 2025
- Ramon Lazkano, Thierry Pécou, Alex Nante, Concertos. Erato, 2025

== Filmography ==
- 2012 : Amour - himself (directed by Michael Haneke)
- 2015 : Bach Goldberg Variations (directed by Stéphan Aubé, Erato)
- 2024 : Boléro - Pierre Lalo (directed by Anne Fontaine)

== Books ==
- Piano intime: conversations avec Nicolas Southon (Philippe Rey, 2013)
- Montrez-moi vos mains (Grasset, 2017)

== Sources ==
- Interview dans Télérama, Number 3083: 11 February 2009, pp. 14 to 16. Wayback Machine
