= Rollo Myers =

English music critic, writer and translator

Rollo Hugh Myers (23 January 1892 – 1 January 1985) was an English music critic, writer and translator. He lived in Paris for many years and became a notable authority on French music for English audiences. He was the first to write an English language study of the music of Erik Satie.

Born in Chislehurst, Kent, Myers was the son of poet, classicist and author Ernest Myers and his wife Nora Margaret Lodge (1858–1952), a sister of the ornithologist George Edward Lodge. His uncle was Frederic W. H. Myers, poet, essayist and founder of the Society for Psychical Research.

Rollo Myers was educated at Balliol College Oxford and (for one year) at the Royal College of Music in London. He lived in Paris from 1919 until 1934, working as a music correspondent for English newspapers, including The Times and the Daily Telegraph. While there he became friendly with many of the leading figures in the world of music and the arts, including Jean Cocteau and Les Six.

In 1935 he joined the BBC, working at Broadcasting House, London in the music information and presentation department. Briefly working in Paris at the end of the war as music officer for the British Council, he returned to London as editor of The Chesterian (from 1947 until its demise in 1961) and of Music Today from 1949. Returning once again to Paris, he took up an appointment at the Organisation for European Economic Cooperation. During the 1950s he made translations of vocal works by Milhaud and Honegger.

Myres was married three times: to Marie G. G. Saey in 1914, to Margareta Von Ungern-Sternberg (1920s?) and to Mary Coop in 1936. His London addresses included 20 Argylle Road, W8 (1950s) and 9, Kynance Place, SW7 (1960s). Later in the 1960s he was living at 45 Queen Street, Eynsham in Oxfordshire. He died in Chichester on January 1, 1985, aged 92, survived by two sons.

== Books ==
- (tr.) Jean Cocteau. Le Coq et l’arlequin (Egoist Press, 1921)
- Modern Music: Its Aims and Tendencies (1923)
- (tr.) Jean Coocteau. Le Rappel à l’ordre (Faber and Gwyer, 1926)
- Music in the Modern World (1939, revised 1948)
- Music Since 1939 (British Council, 1947)
- Debussy (1948)
- Erik Satie (1948)
- Introduction to the Music of Stravinsky (1950)
- (tr.) Renard (Stravinsky) (1956)
- Ravel: Life and Works (1960)
- (ed.) Twentieth Century Music (anthology, 1960, enlarged 1968)
- (tr.) Jacques Bergier. Le Matin des Magiciens (as The Dawn of Magic, 1963)
- (ed. and tr.) Richard Strauss and Romain Rolland: Correspondence (Calder, 1968)
- (ed. and tr.) Emmanuel Chabrier and his Circle (1969)
- Modern French Music (Oxford, 1971)
- (tr.) Stefan Jarocinski. Debussy, a impresionizm i symbolizm (as Debussy: Impressionism and Symbolism, 1976)
