= Marcelle Meyer =

French pianist

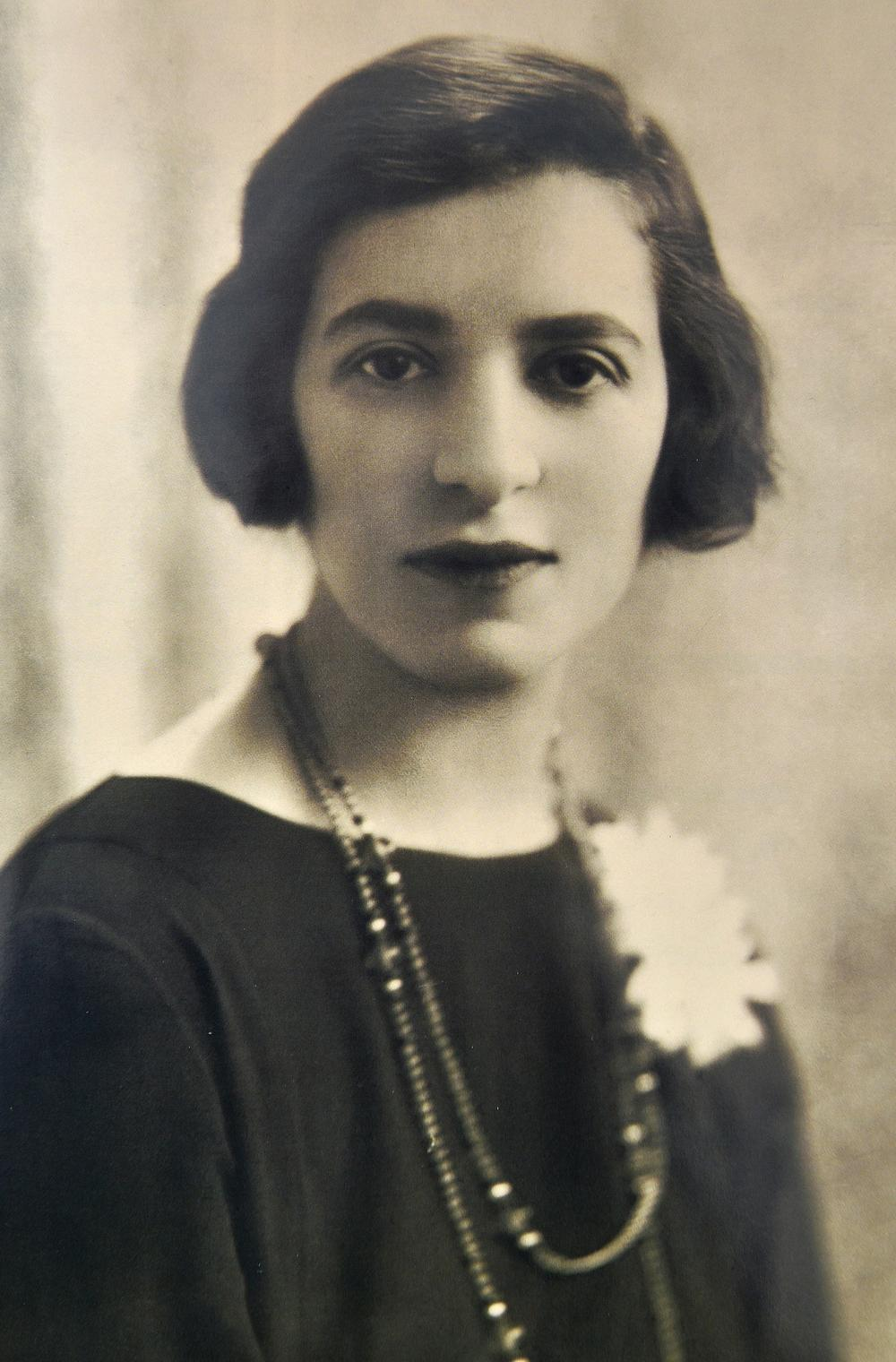

Marcelle Meyer (French: [mɛjɛʁ]; 22 May 1897 – 17 November 1958) was a French pianist. She worked with a group of composers known as Les Six, of whom she was the favored pianist.

== Biography ==
Two-Part Invention No. 1, BWV 772 (0:59)
From J.S. Bach's Inventions and Sinfonias, piano performance (1948)

From Nouvelles Suites de Pièces de Clavecin by Jean-Philippe Rameau (1953 recording)
1. Allemande (3:54)

7. Gavotte et six doubles (6:47)

Marcelle Meyer was born in Lille, France, on 22 May 1897. She was taught piano from the age of five by her sister Germaine, and entered the Conservatoire de Paris in 1911 at age 14, studying with Alfred Cortot and Marguerite Long and was awarded the "Premier Prix" at age 16. She then studied Maurice Ravel and Spanish composers with Ricardo Viñes. She coached with Claude Debussy about how to play his Preludes after having met him when she played the premiere performance of Erik Satie's Parade in 1917. Meyer became Satie's favored pianist and premiered Francis Poulenc's Sonata for piano four hands with the composer. She premiered several of his other works and recorded with him. In the early 1920s she played for Darius Milhaud and Igor Stravinsky. She became famous for her talent and gave recitals in England, the Netherlands and Germany, as well as giving many premieres, including works by Arthur Honegger, Alexis Roland-Manuel, and Igor Markevitch. She was also among those pioneers who re-discovered in France the keyboard music of Johann Sebastian Bach, Jean-Philippe Rameau, François Couperin and Domenico Scarlatti.

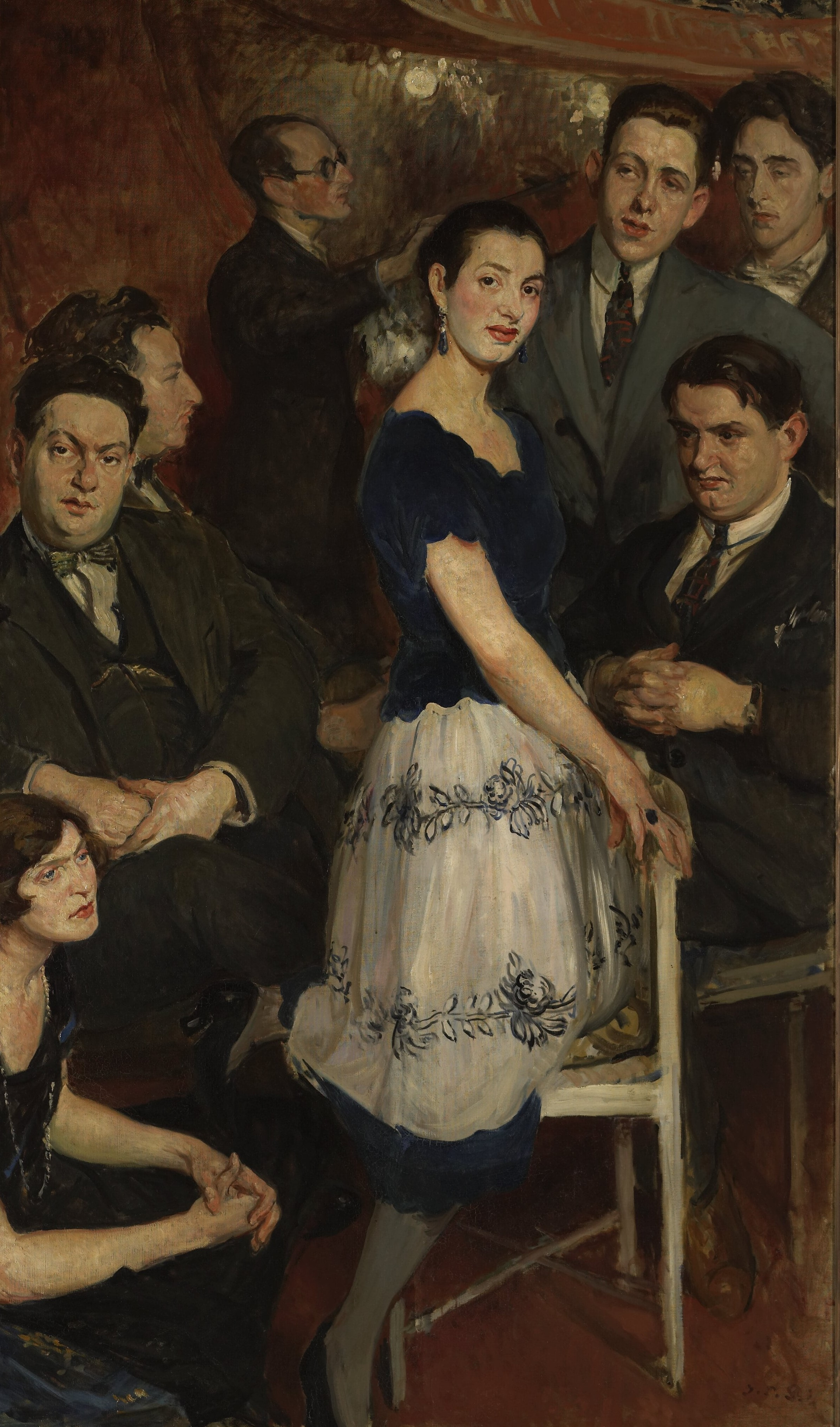
Meyer with Les Six - Group portrait by Jacques-Emile Blanche

In 1922 Jacques-Émile Blanche painted Marcelle Meyer in the company of Jean Cocteau and Les Six, a group of composers consisting of Georges Auric, Louis Durey, Arthur Honegger, Darius Milhaud, Francis Poulenc and Germaine Tailleferre.

She died on 17 November 1958 aged 61 after suffering a heart attack while playing in her sister's Paris apartment.

The actor Pierre Bertin was her first husband, with whom she had a daughter (Marie Bertin). She later married Carlo Di Vieto, an Italian lawyer, with whom she had a second daughter (Anne-Marie Di Vieto).
