= Yūji Takahashi =

Japanese musician

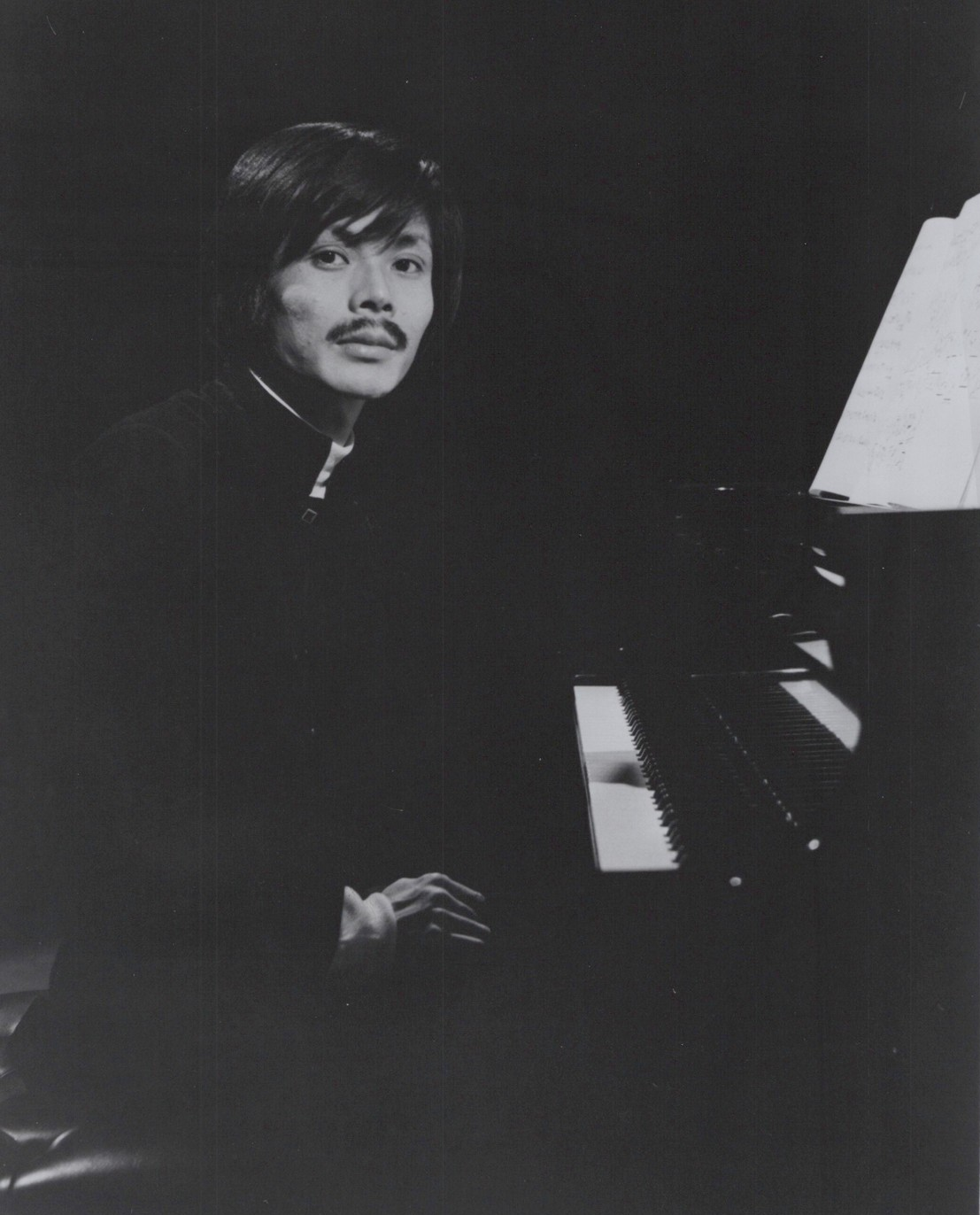
- Takahashi in 1970
- Born: September 21, 1938 (age 87); Tokyo
- Occupations: pianist composer writer publisher
- Children: Ayuo Takahashi (composer)
- Relatives: Aki Takahashi (pianist)

Yūji Takahashi (高橋 悠治, Takahashi Yūji; born 21 September 1938) is a composer, pianist, critic, conductor, and author.

== Biography ==
Yuji Takahashi studied under Roh Ogura and Minao Shibata at the Toho Gakuen School of Music. In 1960, he made his debut as a pianist by performing Bo Nilsson's Quantitäten. He received a grant from The Ford Foundation to study in West Berlin under Iannis Xenakis in 1962 and stayed in Europe until 1966, also stayed in New York under Rockefeller Foundation scholarship until 1972.

He founded 'Suigyu Gakudan' (Water Buffalo band) in 1978 as introducing international protest songs, starting from Thailand, mainly performing Asian songs, also published monthly journal 'Suigyu Tsushin'.

== Selected works ==
- Time (tape)
- Chromamorphe I (fl, hrn in F, trp in C, trb, vib, vn, cb)
- Chromamorphe II (pf)
- 6 Stoicheia (4vn)
- Rosace I (amplified vn)
- Rosace II (pf)
- Operation Euler (2 or 3ob)
- Metathesis I (pf)
- Manangali (didactic piece for women's chorus)
- Three Poems of Mao Tse-Tung (pf or vo[cho], pf)
- Chained Hands in Prayer (pf)
- For You I Sing This Song (cl in B flat, vn, vc, pf) (1976)
- Ji(t) (fl, pf)
- Sieben Rosen hat ein Strauch (vn)
- Kwanju, May 1980 (pf)
- The Pain of the Wandering Wind (pf)
- Like a Water-Buffalo (acc)
- Turn the Corner of the Morning (perc)
- Thread Cogwheels (koto, orch)
- Insomnia (vn, hp)
- Bed Story (vo, koto)
- Sea of Mud (cho, perc)
- Like Swans Leaving the Lake, for viola and accordion (1995)
- Mimi no ho, Sail of the Ears, for Shō, viola and reciter (1994)
- Viola of Dmitri Shostakovich, for viola solo (2002)

== Selected discography ==
Yuji Takahashi has over 100 Japanese releases to his credit.

=== As pianist ===
The complete works of Arnold Schoenberg, Anton Webern and Alban Berg, music by Messiaen (solo pieces, also Visions de l'Amen with Peter Serkin), Iannis Xenakis, John Cage, Rzewski, Na, Cornelius Cardew, Takemitsu, the Indonesian composer Slamet Abdul Sjukur, Earle Brown and Roger Reynolds.

J.S. Bach's The Art of the Fugue (BWV 1080) twice, the Goldberg Variations (BWV 988) twice, the E minor Toccata and the complete Inventions and Sinfonias; two volumes of Satie's solo piano music; a Sonata of Wilhelm Friedemann Bach and Marche et Reminiscences pour mon dernier voyage of Rossini.

=== As conductor ===
Music by Iannis Xenakis, José Maceda, Sofia Gubaidulina, John Zorn and Edgard Varèse.

=== Suigyu Gakudan ===
- 1984 Kyugyo (Cassette)
- 2001 Suigyu Gakudan (CD)

== Award ==
- 2006 Foundation for Contemporary Arts Grants to Artists Award.
