= France Clidat =

French pianist (1932–2012)

France Clidat

France Clidat (Nantes, 22 November 1932 – Paris, 17 May 2012) was a French pianist renowned for her interpretations of the works of Franz Liszt, a great many of which she recorded, and Erik Satie, whose complete piano works she recorded.

== Biography ==
In 1948, at age 15, France Clidat played Henri Sauguet's Concerto in A minor in Geneva under the conductor Ernest Ansermet. She studied at the Paris Conservatory with Lazare Lévy, Maurice Hewitt, Alexis Roland-Manuel, Norbert Dufourcq, and Robert Siohan and received first prize in piano in 1950, at the age of 18. She later studied with Emil Gilels and Lélia Gousseau.

At the Budapest International Competition in September 1956, she won the Franz Liszt Prize, a prize that had not been awarded since 1937. She later performed in many venues around the world. After a recital at the Théâtre des Champs-Élysées in Paris, Bernard Gavoty, reviewer for Le Figaro, dubbed her "Madame Liszt". She was also called "the Ambassadress of the French piano" and she was named alongside Monique Haas, Cécile Ousset, Robert Casadesus and Philippe Entremont as outstanding representatives of the French piano school.

In the 1960s and 1970s, for Les Éditions Vega, she recorded the following works of Franz Liszt for Decca:

- Original works in the field of programme music (Années de pèlerinage, Legends etc.)
- Works of purely folkloristic character (the Hungarian Rhapsodies and pieces generally in the form of dances, waltzes, mazurkas, polonaises, etc.)
- Studies or exercises (various collections of the Transcendental Études)
- Original works in the field of pure music (the Sonata in B minor, ballads, nocturnes, etc.)
- Transcriptions or paraphrases from operas or lieder.

This project included a number of premiere recordings of Liszt's works (Mephisto Waltzes Nos. 3 and 4, Valse oubliée No. 3, Mephisto Polka, Mazurka brillante, two Caprices-Valses, two Csardas, Scherzo and March, Marche solonelle in honour of Goethe, Galop in A minor and two Albumblätter) and it gained her the Grand Prix du Disque de l'Académie Charles Cros and the Grand Prix de l'Académie Européenne du Disque. It is still claimed in various places that she recorded the "complete piano works of Liszt" and "Liszt's complete pianistic output", but this can be shown not to be the case when her Liszt recordings (24 LPs, which were later transferred to 28 CDs) are compared with the 99 Liszt CDs recorded by Leslie Howard, which included over 300 premiere recordings. From 1980 she recorded for Forlane.

France Clidat recorded the complete piano works of Erik Satie, and works by Rachmaninoff, Grieg, Chopin, Tchaikovsky and Marcel Landowski.

She taught at the École Normale de Musique in Paris for a number of years, where she attracted many students from around the world. She also gave masterclasses in various countries, particularly Japan.

Clidat appeared as a juror at many important, international piano competitions, including the Viotti International Piano Competition in Vercelli, Paloma O'Shea International Piano Competition in Santander, International Franz Liszt Competition the 3rd International Rhodes Competition, and the Francis Poulenc Competition.

She published articles about Liszt's solo piano music, such as "The Transcendental Studies: A Lisztian Pianist's Impressions" in New Light on Liszt and His Music (Walker, Saffle, Deaville) and "Aux sources littéraires de Franz Liszt", with Jeanne Fauré-Cousin, an entire double issue of La Révue musicale.

Many works were dedicated to France Clidat and Bruno Rossignol wrote an Aria et Fugato sur le Nom de France Clidat.

Her playing of the Adagio from Grieg's Piano Concerto in A minor, Op. 16, was featured in the 2000 film Maelström.

== Honours ==
She was made a Chevalier des Arts et des Lettres in 1976 and a Chevalier de l'Ordre National du Mérite in 1987.

She was also a Chevalier de la Légion d'honneur and received the Médaille de Vermeil de la Ville de Paris.

== Death ==
France Clidat died on 17 May 2012, aged 79, and was buried in Père Lachaise Cemetery.
