= Pascal Rogé =

French pianist (born 1951)

- Born: 6 April 1951 (age 75); Paris, France
- Genre: Classical
- Occupation: Pianist
- Instrument: Piano
- Website: www.pascalroge.net

Pascal Rogé (born 6 April 1951) is a French pianist.

His playing includes the works of compatriot composers Saint-Saëns, Fauré, Debussy, Ravel, Satie, and Poulenc, among others. However, his repertoire also covers the German and Austrian masters Haydn, Mozart, Brahms, and Beethoven.

== Biography ==
Dedicated photo of Pascal Roge 1973 on first of three southern Africa tours organised by Hans Adler.

Rogé first appearance in public was in 1960 with a performance of Claude Debussy's Préludes. He won the piano prize at the Paris Conservatory and worked for several years with Julius Katchen. At seventeen, he gave his first recitals in major European cities, landing an exclusive contract with Decca in the process. He has a particular affinity with French composers such as Claude Debussy, Gabriel Fauré, Maurice Ravel and Francis Poulenc. He also performs chamber works, with the Pasquier Trio, and with musicians such as Pierre Amoyal or Michel Portal, with whom he recorded Poulenc and Tchaikovsky. He gives recitals worldwide, in all the major centres. A friend of conductor Charles Dutoit, he was regularly invited to Canada to work with the Montreal Symphony Orchestra while Dutoit was conductor there.

In 2011 he and his wife Ami premiered the Concerto for Two Pianos by the Australian composer Matthew Hindson, which was commissioned to celebrate their recent wedding.
