= Jean-Joël Barbier =

French writer and pianist

Jean-Joël Barbier (25 March 1920 – 31 May or 1 June 1994) was a French writer, musicologist and pianist.

Born in Belfort, Barbier began studying literature and music with Blanche Selva and Lazare Lévy but was interrupted by the onset of World War II.

He was a reasonably prolific writer in France, publishing A Dictionary of French Musicians in 1961 and collaborating with La Revue Musicale on a frequent basis. As a pianist, he played mostly the works of French composers such as Claude Debussy, Emmanuel Chabrier and Déodat de Séverac. He later recorded the complete piano works of Erik Satie, which he is most known for today. Barbier contributed to Robert Bresson's 1966 film Au hasard Balthazar, playing the Andantino of Schubert's Sonata in A major for the soundtrack and also playing a minor role as The Priest.

He died in the 14th arrondissement of Paris.
