= Vexations =

Composition by Erik Satie

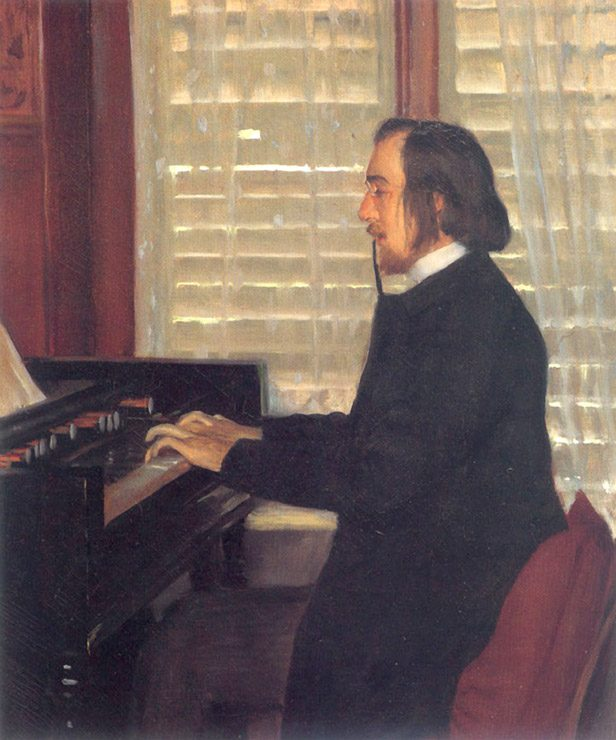
Composer Erik Satie by Santiago Rusiñol, 1890s

Vexations is a musical work by Erik Satie. Apparently conceived for keyboard (although the single page of manuscript does not specify an instrument), it consists of a short theme in the bass whose four presentations are heard alternatingly unaccompanied and played with chords above. The theme and its accompanying chords are written using enharmonic notation. The piece is undated, but scholars usually assign a date around 1893–1894 on the basis of musical and biographical evidence.

The piece bears the inscription "In order to play the motif 840 times in succession, it would be advisable to prepare oneself beforehand, and in the deepest silence, by serious immobilities." ("Pour se jouer 840 fois de suite ce motif, il sera bon de se préparer au préalable, et dans le plus grand silence, par des immobilités sérieuses.") From the 1960s onward, this text has mostly been interpreted as an instruction that the page of music should be played 840 times, although this may not have been Satie's intention.

== Publication ==
Satie did not publish the work in his lifetime, and is not known ever to have performed or mentioned it. The piece was first printed in 1949 (in facsimile form, by John Cage in Contrepoints No. 6). The first American publication of the piece was in Art News Annual, vol. 27 (1958), again in facsimile. The first British publication was as an engraved example in an article by Peter Dickinson in Music Review, vol. 28 (1967). In 1969 the publisher Éditions Max Eschig produced the first commercial edition of the work, placing it second in a collection of three so-called Pages mystiques. Since there is no musicological evidence linking Vexations to the other works in the volume, its appearance in that context indicates nothing more than an editor's desire to publish Satie's uncollected compositions in three-part assemblages such as the Gymnopédies, Gnossiennes, etc.

== First public performance ==
Vexations appears to have had no performance history before the idea gained ground that the piece was required to be played 840 times. The first of the marathon performances of the work in this way was on 9 September 1963, produced by John Cage and Lewis Lloyd at the Pocket Theatre at 100 Third Avenue in Manhattan by the Pocket Theatre Piano Relay Team, organized by Cage.

Pianists included Cage, David Tudor, Christian Wolff, Philip Corner, Viola Farber, Robert Wood, MacRae Cook, John Cale, David Del Tredici, James Tenney, Howard Klein (the New York Times reviewer, who was asked to play in the course of the event) and Joshua Rifkin, with two reserves. Cage set the admission price at $5 and had a time clock installed in the lobby of the theatre. Each patron checked in with the clock and when leaving the concert, checked out again and received a refund of 5¢ for each 20 minutes attended. "In this way", he told Lloyd, "people will understand that the more art you consume, the less it should cost." But Cage had underestimated the length of time the concert would take. It lasted over 18 hours.

One person was present for the entire performance: Karl Schenzer, an actor with The Living Theatre.

== Meaning ==
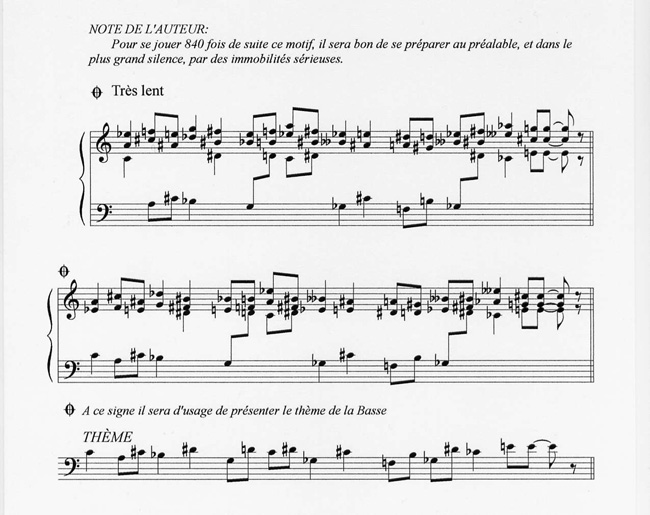
Vexations piano score

Satie never explained the piece's title. Conjectures regarding the meaning of Vexations (and its title) were construed long after Satie's death and in most cases, supported by little evidence.

- The notation of the chords makes extensive use of enharmonic spellings, making it difficult to read immediately.
- Vexations could be interpreted as Satie's coming to terms with Wagnerism. In this interpretation, Vexations would be Satie's ironic act of defiance. He could outdo music as lengthy and intense as Wagner's Der Ring des Nibelungen, using only the limited resources available to him; hence Gavin Bryars' description of it as 'a sort of Ring des Nibelungen des pauvres' ("poor man's Ring of the Nibelungen"). Vexations can also be seen as an attack on – or a parodic emulation of – what in Wagnerian music is known as the "unendliche Melodie" (unending melody), in which melody is supported by a continuously modulating progression of complex chords. In mood and compositional technique this brings Vexations near to the – certainly mocking – Choral inappétissant ("unsavoury Choral"), the first (introductory) piece of Sports et divertissements, which he composed more than 20 years later, after he had studied conventional counterpoint for several years.
- Vexations was written in a period when Satie's approach to harmony was related rather to a modal line of thought than to conventional harmony. Harmonically, Vexations appears to be an exercise in non-resolving tritones. Maybe Satie's intent was nothing more than to prove that any harmonic and rhythmic system was only a matter of habit for the hearer (and not resulting from innate or divine preconception, as his contemporaries would think): so that after listening 840 times to a chordal system that is at odds with any habitual one, and set in an odd metre, one would possibly start to experience this new system to be as natural as any other – an experiment he was likely to have taken seriously, and maybe directly or indirectly influenced Debussy and/or Ravel.
- Although the date of composition is uncertain, Vexations appears to have been composed shortly after a brief, but intense, affair with Suzanne Valadon, the nearest Satie ever got to a relationship with a woman, as far as is known. One of the testaments to this relationship is Satie's optimistic composition Bonjour Biqui (April 1893), Biqui being a nickname for his beloved, and the composition being an echo of how Satie customarily greeted her. It can be conjectured that Satie – being "vexé" ("angry", or even "spiteful") about being rejected by his "Biqui"—wanted to disenchant himself from what she had meant to him, by composing a piece that would help him forget all such frivolous feelings.
- It is also possible that Satie was spoofing the perpetuum mobile genre: many 19th-century composers had composed such separate pieces, then very popular, with an 'indefinite' number of repeats, mostly leaning on dextrous virtuosity. References like "immobilities", a definite (but disproportionately high) number of repeats, an unconventional harmony, and a "very slow" tempo, instead of the usual very rapid one of a perpetuum mobile, all might indicate that Satie was making a parody of this genre, spiting the cheap effects of content-less virtuosity in an uninspired harmonic and rhythmical scheme, that his contemporaries would use to suggest "rapture" to their public.
- The deeply rooted idea (from its first publication on) that Vexations might have been intended by Satie as an experiment regarding boredom appears to find little support in the ideas expressed by Satie himself, although he described boredom as 'profound and mysterious'.
- Other anachronistic explanations involve Dadaism (which was only invented by the end of the 2nd decade of the 20th century); Musique d'ameublement (also not before the end of the 2nd decade of the 20th century, at which time Satie described it as a novelty); conceptual art (not before the 1960s); etc. Satie is often described as a precursor, or in the spirit of Oulipo, an 'anticipatory plagiarist' of subsequent developments.
- Why Satie chose 840 as the number of repetitions has also been subject to conjecture: there is no conclusive evidence showing why he would have preferred this number to any other. The fact that 840 is the product of the numbers from 4 to 7 does not shed much additional light on the meaning that the number 840 might have had to Satie, though the esoteric sects or cults Satie had been involved in up till the moment that he wrote Vexations could be supposed to have some interest in numerology. When Satie started his own sect, the Metropolitan Church of Art of Jesus the Conductor, supposedly around the same time as composing Vexations, he appeared sure in his use of numbers (e.g. in the printed pamphlet listing the numbers of each type of adherent the sect was to have acquired, some of these numbers going back to biblical data). An article by Martha Curti (now Mother Felicitas) on the numerology of 840 may shed more light on the subject.

The composition could be seen in a tradition of "riddle music", somewhere between the riddle canons of Bach's The Musical Offering and Elgar's Enigma Variations.

== Execution ==
There is no indication that Satie intended the Vexations for public performance – the introductory text he wrote, as quoted above, rather indicating it was intended as a one-person experience (e.g. as a restrained way to work off anger, or to get one's ears tuned to an unconventional harmonic system and metre). Satie made no effort to get either "Vexations" or "Bonjour Biqui" published during his life, scarcely, or not at all, communicating about their existence (there were more of his compositions sharing this fate).

As to the total duration of the work, and whether it is to be played aloud or silently, it is hard to ascertain what Satie's intentions were:

- No metronomical tempo indication: the score mentions "Très lent" (very slow), which could mean anything while the composition has not a melody that could be experienced as falling in one or another "natural" cadence – at least not at first sight: some (e.g. the pianist Armin Fuchs, who executed the work in its entirety several times) argue there is a natural cadence nonetheless (26 quarter-note beats per minute in Fuchs' case, which extends total execution to 28 hours)
- It is not clear whether Satie intended the bass-line (equal to both halves of the composition) to be repeated in between of every half vexation: his precise instruction is "À ce signe il sera d'usage de présenter le thème de la Basse" – "At this sign customarily the theme of the Bass will be presented" (the "sign" occurring in between of every half vexation): être d'usage not really being an obligation. There is more to be said about this sign: modern executions and editions of the score usually interpret that for every Vexation the thème de la Basse is to be played twice, while the original manuscript of Satie indicates the "sign" for playing this theme three times: once preceding (and quite above) the "motif", and once after every half of the "motif", which seems to indicate that the thème de la Basse has to be played before the "motif" is played the first time (which is usually done), but also that it is the thème de la Basse concluding the complete cycle (and not the 840th pass of the second half of the motif, as it is usually interpreted). This would extend the total execution time by about half a minute.
- Even the 840 repeats have been questioned, for several reasons: in a "Mantra" or "habituation" approach there is not much sense in counting exactly how many times one repeats the "motif" to oneself. Also the indication Satie gives does not implicate it is mandatory to repeat 840 times: it is only a remark about the kind of preparation that is needed in the event that one wants to play it 840 times consecutively to oneself. There is no certainty Satie ever played the Vexations (or knew them executed), either with or without repeats (probably neither, because in the course of such action it probably would have emerged that the A on the 6th beat of the second half of the motif needs an accidental one way or another: either a pitch-changing accidental, like for the A's immediately before – beat 2 – or after – beat 8 – this A, either a natural, to make the middle melody of the second half of the motif identical to the high-pitch melody of the first half). Probably in most performances the imaginary natural is played. Likewise, the bass C on the sixth quarter-note and the bass B on the second half of the ninth quarter-note require (presumably) naturals; the E on the fifth quarter-note is provided with a natural in the inverted version, but not in the original version. The score also presents us with two other fairly fundamental questions: (1) Why is there one diminished fourth (later inverted to an augmented fifth) among the tritones? and (2) Is the tied eighth-note chord at the end intended as a repetition of the previous chord (which requires an inconsistent interpretation of accidentals that would treat the C as a C♯) or does the C♯ revert to a C (in which case the whole thing would end on a C major chord)?
- No indication whatsoever regarding at what volume it has to be played.
- It is not clear whether exactly the same speed and volume for every repetition is advised: in the "vexation"-anger comparison mentioned above, it would not be impossible to imagine moods (expressed by tempo and volume, and additional expression by means of arpeggio, rubato, and the like) swinging from "rage" to "dejection", and everything in between, all along the same sitting, in a sort of "Etudes d'execution transcendante"-style – while obviously the standard interpretation, which is a monotonous execution (keeping to the same tempo and volume) throughout, maximally avoiding romantic implication, is more than arguably correct too.
- While the bass-note ending the motif is a major third above the first bass-note of the motif, even an execution with a modulating progression for every repeat would not be unthinkable: Satie nowhere indicates that the "motif" (which is by definition a musical entity not tied to a particular key) or the "bass theme" is to be executed at the same pitch every time.

Cage's own intervallic analysis made for the first performance is in Lloyd's collection at the Beinecke Rare Book and Manuscript Library at Yale University along with the performers' time keeper sheets from that concert.

Although there is no unambiguous indication that the Vexations should be played on the piano – an execution on another keyboard instrument, like the then popular harmonium, not being impossible – there is little doubt that this is the intended instrument.

Ornella Volta (from the Archives Erik Satie in Paris) has been preparing a dossier with several studies regarding this work and its executions. This dossier, which has not been published, is intended to contain a full analysis and a facsimile reproduction of the original score.

The musicologist Richard Toop as a young pianist gave the first complete performance by a single pianist in 1967.

Not all attempted performances of this work have been successful. In 1970, Australian pianist Peter Evans decided to abandon a solo performance of the piece after 595 repetitions because he felt that "evil thoughts" were overtaking him and observed "strange creatures emerging from the sheet music".

The team at MakerBot Industries has programmed one of their robots to perform Vexations. It was performed for the public for the first time at a 2010 New York City Maker Faire. The performance was based on the one by Armin Fuchs in Dresden in 2000.

On 12 December 2012, French pianist Nicolas Horvath performed in the Palais de Tokyo a non-stop solo version lasting 35 hours.

In September 2016, during the three days of the sci-tech Trieste Next festival, the pianist and multimedia artist Adriano Castaldini performed an open-air solo of the entire Vexations, conceiving a very new way of interpreting the piece, i.e. making audible the psycho-physical experience of vexation by connecting his body to the live electronic processing of the piano sound: during the performance, the pianist wore a sensor system (EEG, EMG, GSR and temperature sensors) not simply for medical feedback, but to process medical data in real time using a software (coded by Castaldini himself) that turned data into control values for the piano sound live processing (the sound was captured by seven microphones inside the piano).

In 2017 Alessandro Deljavan performed the 840 repetitions of the theme, plus one slowed-down final theme, using a digital visual metronome to maintain perfect timing throughout the entire performance. He recorded the entire performance inside the OnClassical recording studio. That resulted in a twelve-albums collection, 14,5+ hours long, 841 tracks, which gained over 10 millions listenings on Spotify.

On 2 December 2017, alt-classical concert series ChamberLab hosted a marathon performance of Vexations as a fundraiser for the American Civil Liberties Union, and raised almost $17,000 in pledges and donations. The event was open to all musicians, and 34 participated throughout the day at the Hotel Congress in Tucson, Arizona.

On 30 May 2020, Igor Levit performed all 840 repetitions of Vexations at the B-sharp Studio, Berlin. The performance streamed on Periscope, Twitter and other platforms, including on The New Yorker's website. Levit said the recital was in response to the COVID-19 pandemic, his reaction to which he characterised as a "silent scream" ("stumme Schrei"). The 840 sheets of music were sold individually to assist out-of-work musicians.

From 29 to 30 January 2021, Bot_pianist.ver, a robot made by ATOD, performed all 840 repetitions of Vexations for 19 hours 30 minutes at Platform-L Contemporary Art Center in Seoul. It was a part of Furniture Music in the 4th Industrial Revolution Era: a convergence of an exhibition and performance; a reconstruction of Satie's Vexations conducted by PyoungRyang Ko. This work was a part of the Art & Tech Project by Arts Council Korea (ARKO) and Hanyang Industry-university Cooperation Foundation. The convergence of the exhibition and the performance was streamed on YouTube.

On 3 February 2021, 12 players and composers performed at the Hall of Halls, the music box museum in Kiyosato at the southern foot of the Yatsugatake Mountains, Japan. The performers were Mana Fukui, Wataru Iwata, Masakazu Yamamoto, KaoLi, Taro Yoshihara, Keitaro Yamaguchi, Kazuya Saegusa, Sachiko Kawano, Mamoru Yamamoto, Satoka Yokoyama, Shunichi Komatsubara, and Ayumi Satake. Instruments used were piano, French horn, trumpet, cello, double bass, key harmonica, voice, organetta (street organ), organite (hand-cranked music box).

On 13 August 2021, American pianist Aaron D. Smith performed a non-stop solo version lasting 36 hours and 22 minutes in Salt Lake City, Utah. It is known to be the longest non-stop solo piano version ever performed, though the pianist was described as having trouble concentrating and staying awake. This performance was conducted alongside six dancers in conjunction with the Interdisciplinary Arts Collective.

On 8 September 2023 The Village Trip festival in New York opened with a performance of Vexations that began at 6am and concluded at 8pm. It featured Joan Forsyth, who conceived the idea, as well as Marilyn Nonken, Adam Tendler, Chester Biscardi and Marc Peloquin, who closed the performance.

On 30 September 2023, a performance of “Vexations: a mantra for Kyiv” ("Vexations: mantra dla Kijowa") was held in Kraków as part of the Music in Old Balice festival (since 2024 Silence Music Festival), to which both Krakow Mayor Jacek Majchrowski and Kyiv Mayor Vitali Klitschko were invited. It was repeated 840 times by 30 pianists, which took about 35 hours of continuous playing. The performance took place at the “Kyiv” Cinema in Krakow (live) and at the Kyiv Cultural Cluster “Krakow” in Kyiv (thanks to the latest technologies enabling the creation of pararel reality through StreamArt by UKRAiNATV without the physical participation of the artists). As its creators Mateusz Zubik i Miłosz Horodyski announced, it was a reflection on the war in Ukraine and an expression of solidarity with the nation fighting for freedom.

On 17–18 February 2024, Japanese artist Ai Onoda performed a non-stop solo of Vexations at the Yamagoya gallery and shop in Ebisu, Tokyo. Onoda repeated it 840 times according to the score, playing from 11am on 17th to around 7am on 18th. He wore a diaper, and drank water and ate snacks while playing with only his left hand. He prepared 840 copies of the score, and dropped each page on the floor as he finished them. Onoda used Rhodes Mark-II Stage Piano 54 for this performance. Japanese archivist Yosuke Nakagawa recorded and documented it.

In October 2025, Vexations was performed at the historic St Pancras Clock Tower in London, organized by Francesco Pio Gennarelli and Matthew Lee Knowles. The performance featured Gennarelli and fellow pianists Matthew Lee Knowles, Jelena Makarova, Neil Georgeson, Aidan Chan, Edward Tait, Xuanxin Chen, Ben Smith, and Thomas Ang. The event began at 10:00 am on October 17 and concluded at 2:00 am on October 19, lasting a total of 40 hours, 16 minutes, and 50 seconds. The concert, which is available to watch online, was held in aid of Help Musicians.

Over the weekend of 16/17th May 2026, pianist Andrew Brixey-Williams performed what may have been only the second ever solo performance of ‘Vexations’ in the UK. The performance took place at OPEN Ealing, an arts centre in west London. It began at 7.00 am on May 16th and ended around 2.30 am on the 17th, around 19.5 hours, with ten minute breaks every two hours. The performance also raised funds for the young people’s mental health charity, Young Minds UK. Artist, Jolie Goodman responded to the performance by creating digital images, and the project was generously supported by OPEN Ealing and Piano Restorations Ltd, who supplied a restored Bechstein, from 1924, the penultimate year of Satie’s life. There is also a podcast available on Spotify, a dialogue with French music academic, Dr Caroline Potter, and Andrew Brixey-Williams.
