= Heures séculaires et instantanées =

1914 piano composition by Erik Satie

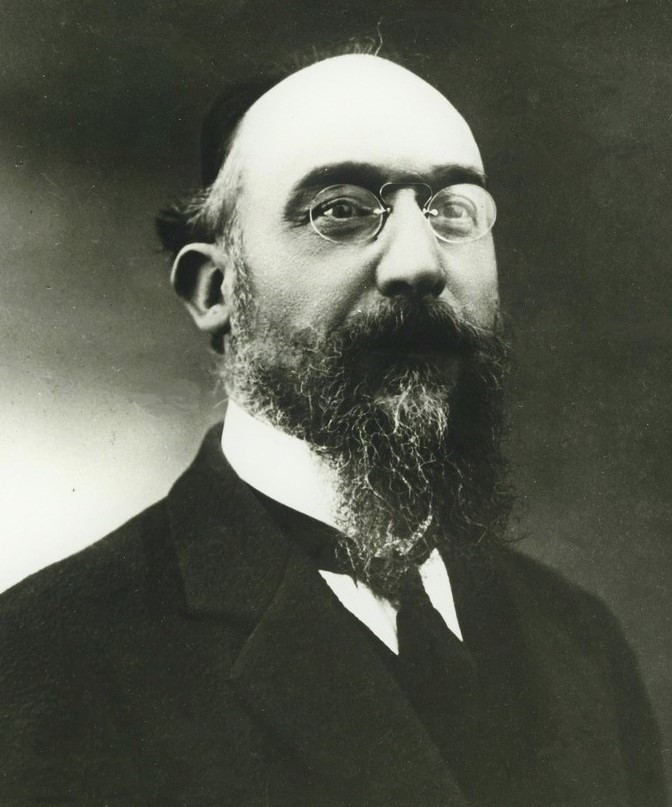
Erik Satie

Heures séculaires et instantanées (Age-Old and Instantaneous Hours) is a 1914 piano composition by Erik Satie. One of his humoristic keyboard suites of the 1910s, it features Satie's famous warning to pianists against reading aloud the fanciful texts that adorned his scores. In performance it lasts about 4 minutes.

Publication of the Heures, like several of Satie's 1914 works, was delayed by the outbreak of World War I. It was finally issued by the firm E. Demets in 1916. Ricardo Viñes gave the premiere at the Galerie Barbazanges in Paris on March 11, 1917.

== Text and music ==
Satie wrote the Heures in June and July 1914, almost immediately after completing Sports et divertissements. In that work his need to express his literary side was restricted by the limits of one page per composition on themes not of his choosing, a challenge he conquered with haikulike precision. Here Satie was able to unleash his imagination with narratives that, on the page at least, seem to demand equal status with the music. "There are as many words as notes!" opined French composer-critic Guy Sacre. Biographer Rollo H. Myers saw in the Heures a foreshadowing of surrealism (a decade before the fact) and a new phase in the interrelationship between text and music in Satie's piano suites: "...for the first time the isolated verbal quips and sallies are replaced by a kind of recitation or monologue, which is an integral part of the composition. This is no longer a running commentary, arbitrarily superimposed and often irrelevant to the music it accompanies; it is a definite narration, of grotesque inspiration, which the music is there to illustrate".

A whimsical concept of Time unifies the suite, which consists of three pieces marked Noirâtre (Blackish), Sans Grandeur (Without Grandeur), and Vivement (Strongly). It is dedicated to an imaginary Englishman, with a real French monarch tossed in for good measure:

To Sir William Grant-Plumot, I pleasantly dedicate this collection. So far, two personalities have surprised me: Louis XI and Sir William: the first, by the strangeness of his good-naturedness; the second, by his continual immobility. It is an honor for me to pronounce here the names of Louis XI and Sir William Grant-Plumot.

The three pieces are:

1. Obstacles venimeux (Venomous Obstacles)
2. Crépuscule matinal (de midi) (Morning Twilight [At Midday] )
3. Affolements granitiques (Granite Panic)

=== 1. Obstacles venimeux ===
A humorously plodding theme introduces us to the sole inhabitant of a vast landscape - a negro "so bored he could die of laughing". Holding his cerebellum in his right hand so he can think better, he watches snakes cling to his uniform, toads calling each other by name, and a mangrove bathing its filthy roots on the banks of a river. Shadows from ancient trees indicate it is 9:17 - "not a good time for lovers" - and after a brief lively moment the plodding theme limps to a dissonant halt.

=== 2. Crépuscule matinal (de midi) ===
Accompanied by a light march motif, the narrator airs his grievances against the sun, which "looks like a good fellow" but cannot be trusted because of its tendency to burn up crops and give people sun stroke. These observations conclude with a droll non-sequitur: "Behind the barn an ox is eating itself sick".

=== 3. Affolements granitiques ===
While a rainstorm descends on a dusty old village, the town clock dodders and prepares to strike thirteen hours at 1 PM ("Alas, not the legal time"). Trees slap each other with their branches and granite boulders jostle to see which one can be the most annoying. Near the beginning and end of the piece the clock is illustrated with 13 lugubrious "ticks" in the bass. Satie wraps up the score with one of his favorite musical tricks, disguising an ordinary upward scale passage in arbitrary enharmonic notation.

== The warning ==
At the bottom of the published score's first page, by all appearances a footnote, is Satie's "avertissement" to the players. It has sparked some controversy about his texted piano pieces over the years.

To Whomsoever

I forbid the text to be read out loud during the performance of the music. Failure to conform with these instructions will cause the transgressor to incur my just indignation.

No special exceptions will be granted.

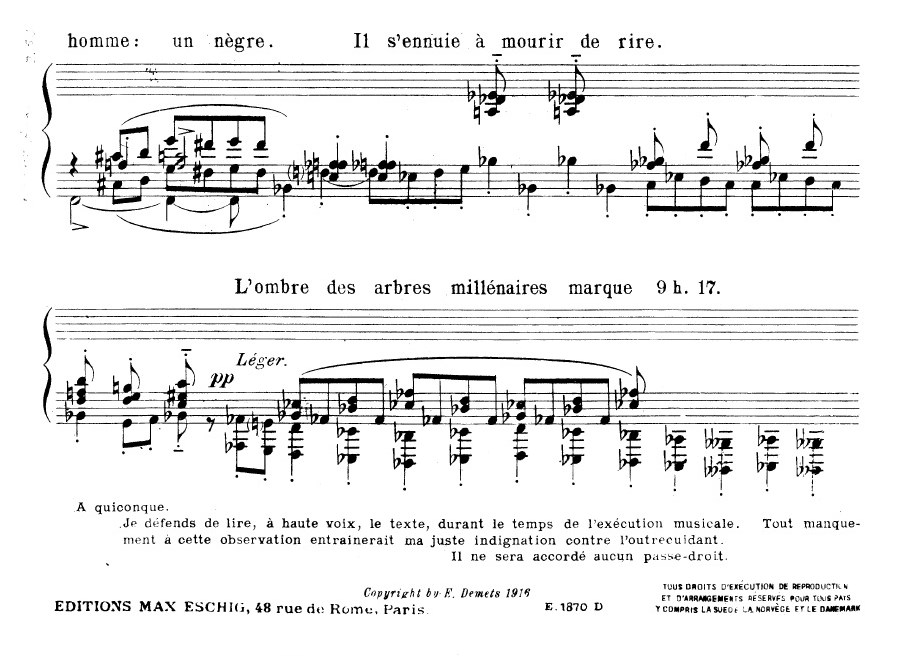
Excerpt from the first page of the published score, with Satie's "warning" below the bottom stave

The haughty tone is reminiscent of the half-serious public pronouncements Satie made as a young Montmartre bohemian and leader of his own fictitious church in the 1890s, leading some scholars to believe the statement was tongue-in-cheek. But it confirms that by 1916 some pianists were declaiming the texts for added entertainment value, and the composer evidently took issue with this. Francis Poulenc, who knew Satie well, flatly stated that the warning was no joke and offenders would suffer "pain of major excommunication" when caught; he also recalled the composer telling him "The stories and funny remarks...are rewards for the player" and must not be read out before the performances either. Ornella Volta likewise quoted Satie as saying they were "a secret between the performer and myself". Satiean scholarship has mostly taken him at his word.

But the charm and absurdist wit of Satie's commentaries have always beguiled certain advocates into combining spoken word with the music. As early as 1917 American critic Carl Van Vechten proposed that the texts should be a vital component in presenting the suites, allowing the audience to share in the fun. Possibly the first documented example of this took place at the Sorbonne in Paris on December 7, 1925, during a Satie tribute concert that was broadcast over French Radio PTT. The program included Jane Mortier performing unnamed works of his for "piano parlé" ("talking piano"). Author Caroline Potter mused, "Perhaps it is significant that Mortier waited until Satie had died before carrying out this experiment".

Since the 1950s, the idea of interpreting Satie's humoristic suites as works for narrator and piano has clung most tenaciously to Sports et divertissements, due in part to the popular efforts of American composer-critic Virgil Thomson. But it remains a minor trend. Most mainstream concerts and commercial recordings let Satie's music speak for itself.

== Recordings ==
Notable recordings include those by Aldo Ciccolini (three times, for Angel in 1957 and 1968 and EMI in 1987), Jean-Joël Barbier (BAM, 1967), Frank Glazer (Vox, 1968, reissued 1990), France Clidat (Forlane, 1980), Anne Queffélec (Virgin Classics, 1988), Pascal Rogé (Decca, 1989), Yitkin Seow (Hyperion, 1989), Peter Lawson (EMI, 1989), Jean-Pierre Armengaud (Mandala, 1994), Klára Körmendi (Naxos Records, 1994), Bojan Gorišek (Audiophile Classics, 1994), Olof Höjer (Swedish Society Discofil, 1996), Jean-Yves Thibaudet (Decca, 2003), Håkon Austbø (Ddd, 2005), Cristina Ariagno (Brilliant Classics, 2007), Jan Kaspersen (Scandinavian Classics, 2007), Alexandre Tharaud (Harmonia Mundi, 2009), Jeroen van Veen (Brilliant Classics, 2016), Noriko Ogawa (BIS, 2016).
