= The Village Trip =

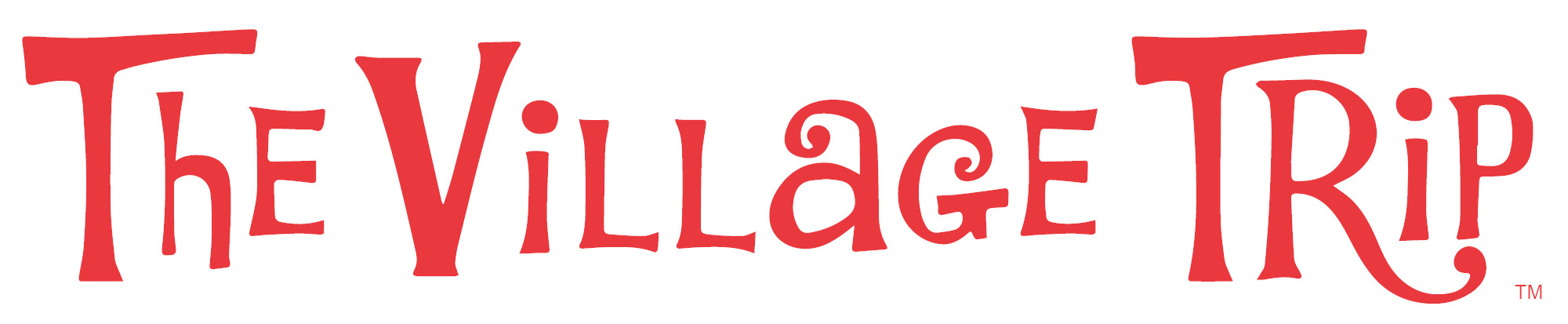
Logo for The Village Trip festival

The Village Trip is an annual festival celebrating arts and activism, culture and community, in Greenwich Village and neighbouring areas of New York City. The Village Trip was named Best Urban Celebration Event 2025 and Best Urban Festival 2025 USA, in the LUXLife Magazine Travel & Tourism Awards 2025.

The mission statement of the annual Village Trip Festival is “To uplift, to entertain, and to celebrate the arts for all New Yorkers, their families, and all people from around the world who come to visit Downtown Manhattan’s special oases, Greenwich Village and the East Village.” It covers music, theatre, fine arts, politics, written word, spoken word and dance.

== Background ==
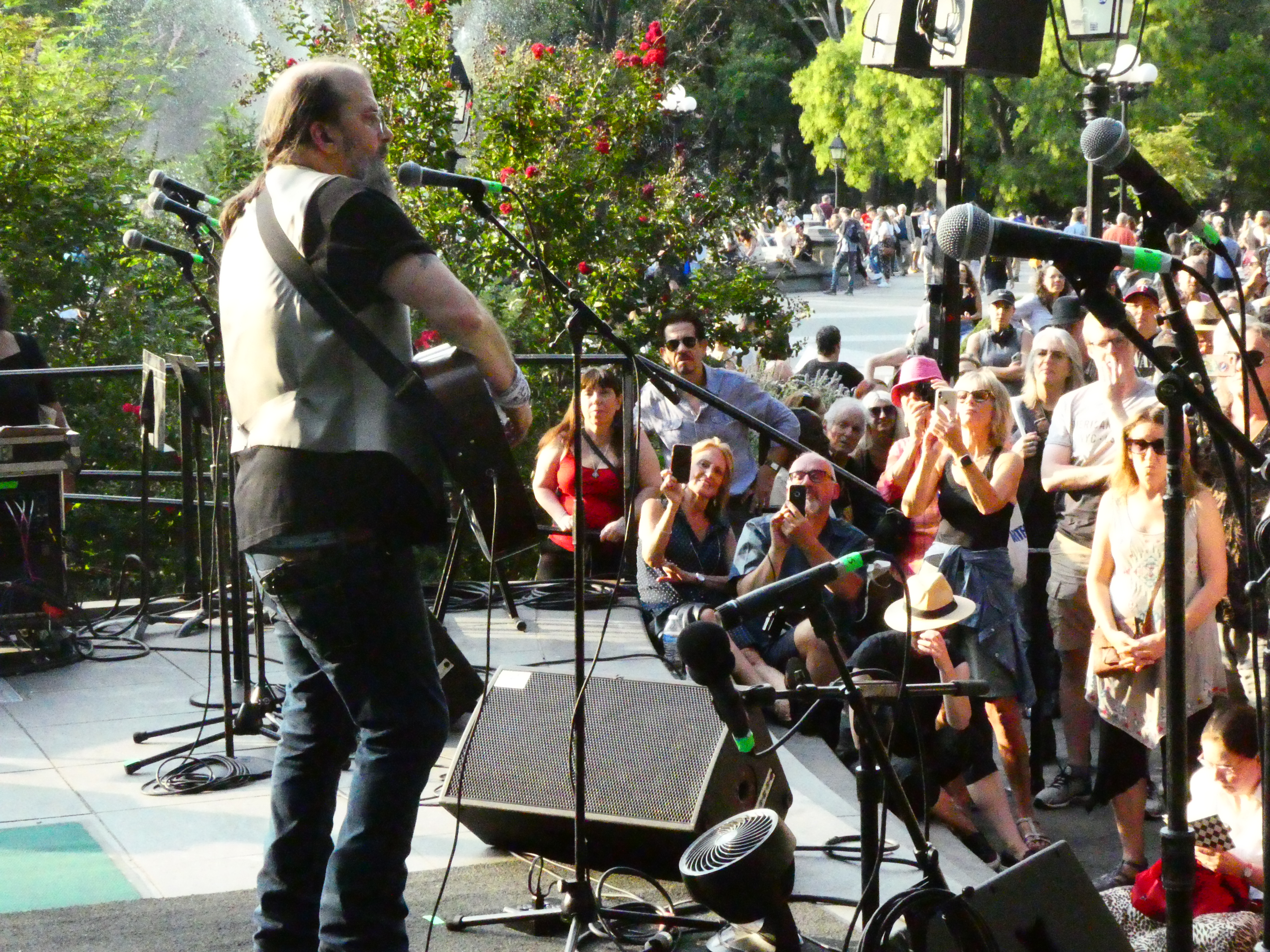
Singer-songwriter Steve Earle playing in Washington Square Park at The Village Trip 2019

The original idea for The Village Trip was conceived in 2010 by London-based journalist Liz Thomson out of a fascination with the music and cultural history of Greenwich Village and her editorial work on No Direction Home: The Life and Music of Bob Dylan by the late Robert Shelton. In 2015, Judy Paul and Marc Garrett, then owners of the Washington Square Hotel, offered Thomson a base from which to develop the idea of the festival. The hotel itself had previously been the residence of many of Greenwich Village’s most famous cultural figures. The festival's name, The Village Trip, was conceived by local writer and historian John Sorensen. In spring 2018, David Amram, whose artistic ties to the Village span more than half a century, joined the organisers as Artist in Residence. In 2019, he accepted the title of Artist Emeritus.

The Village Trip Festival was launched in September 2018 as a sponsored project of Fractured Atlas. Originally a three-day event, between 2021 and 2024 it grew to fifteen days but has more recently settled at ten days. The dates vary each year to accommodate the Jewish High Holy Days, but the concert in Washington Square Park always takes place on the final Saturday of September. The festival became a 501c3 non-profit in June 2023 through support from the Dr David M Milch Foundation.

== Development ==
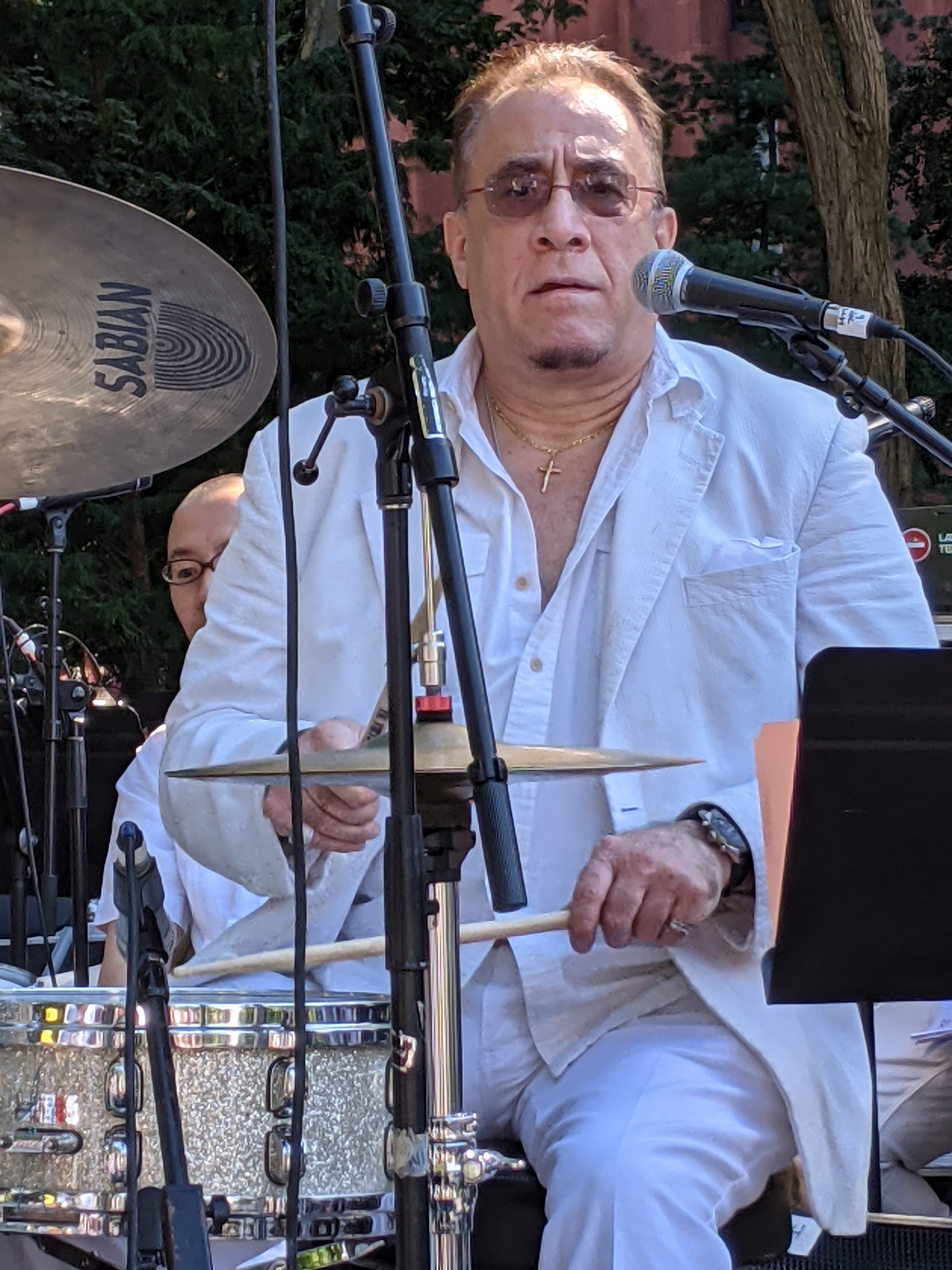
Bobby Sanabria leading his Multiverse Big Band at The Village Trip, 2021

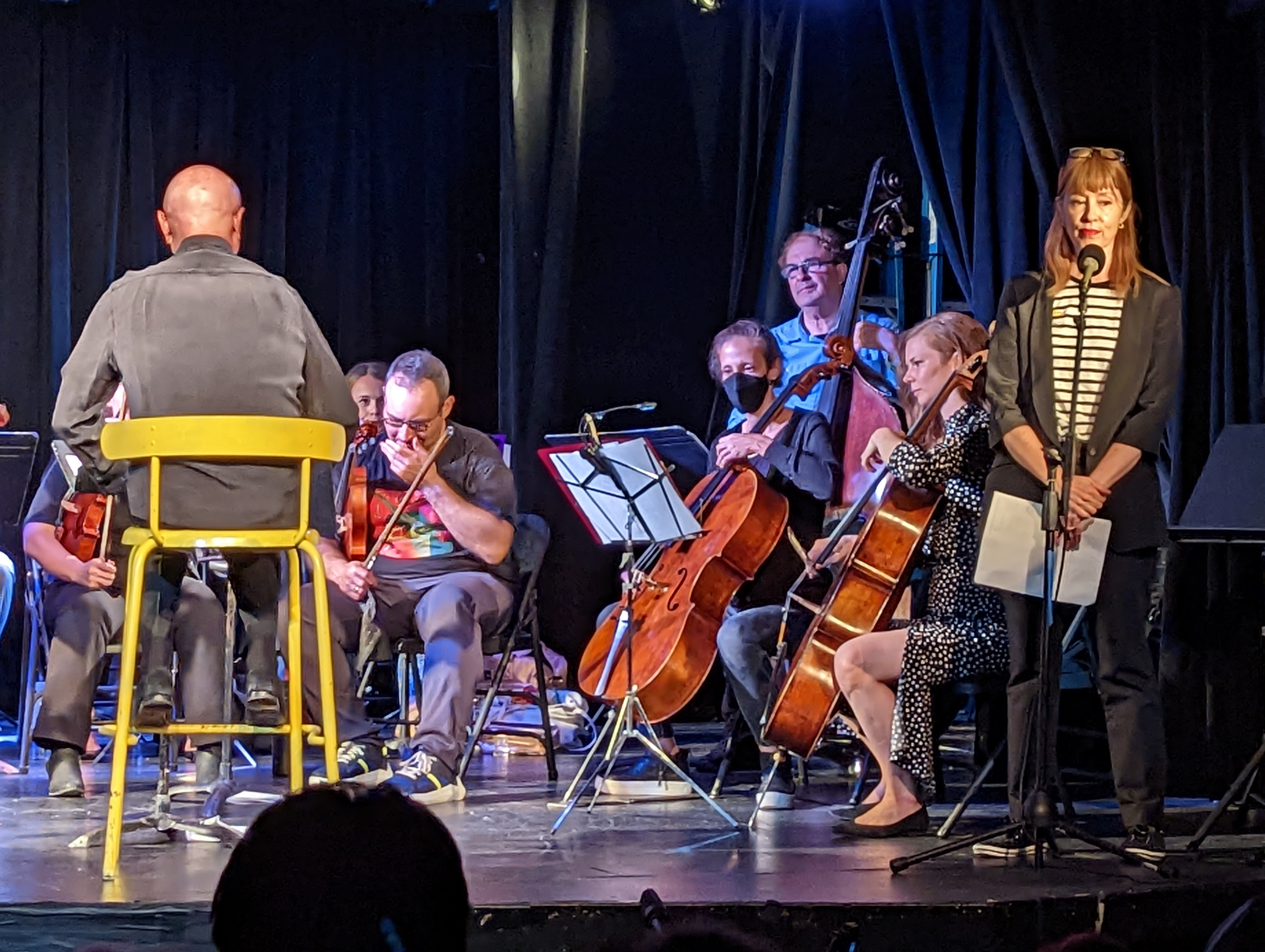
Singer-songwriter Suzanne Vega with Composers Concordance for Songs and Poems from the Village at The Village Trip 2022

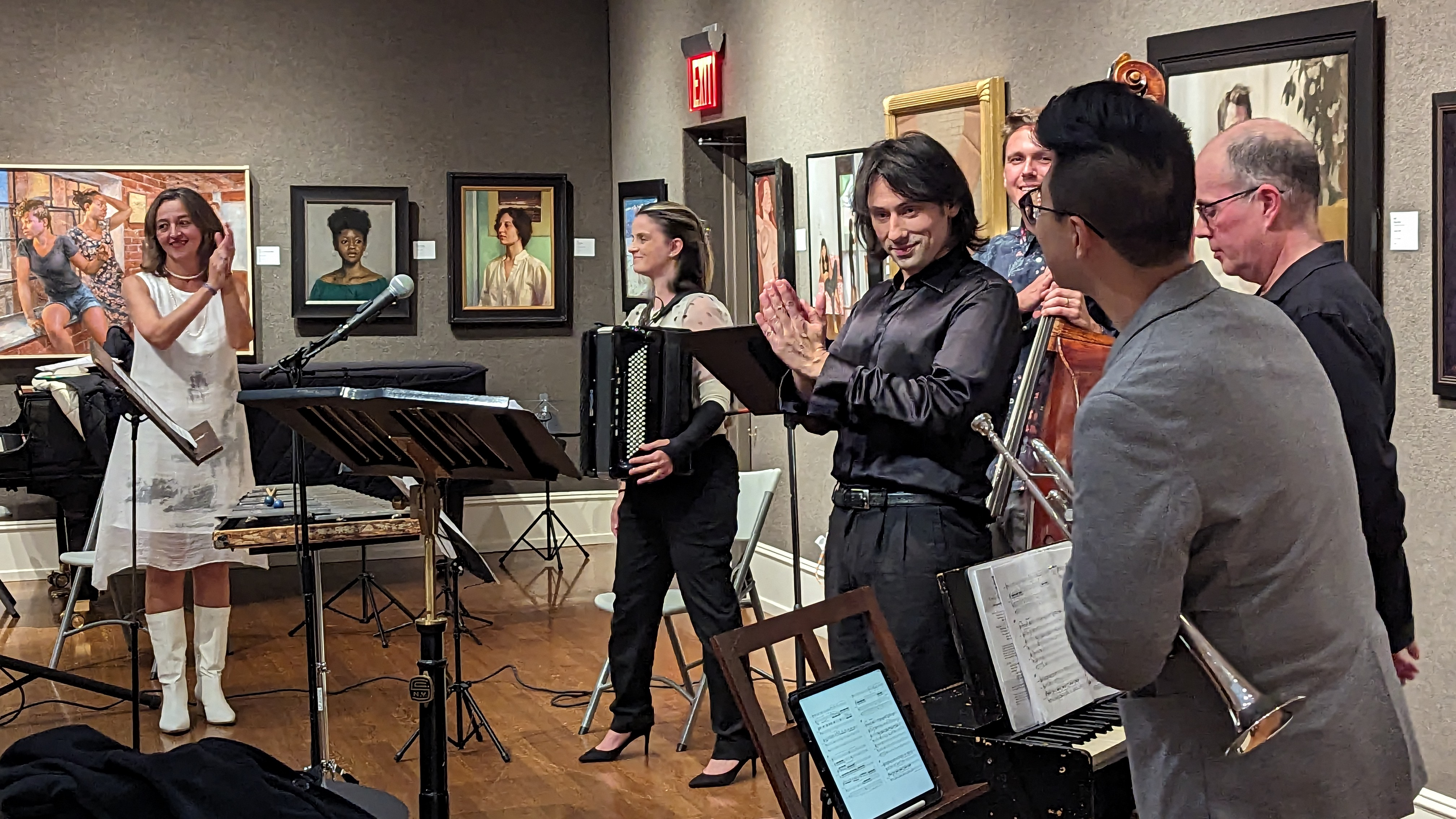
Aleksandra Vrebalov takes a bow following Joseph Keckler's premiere of Simic Songs at the Salmagundi Club during The Village Trip, 2023

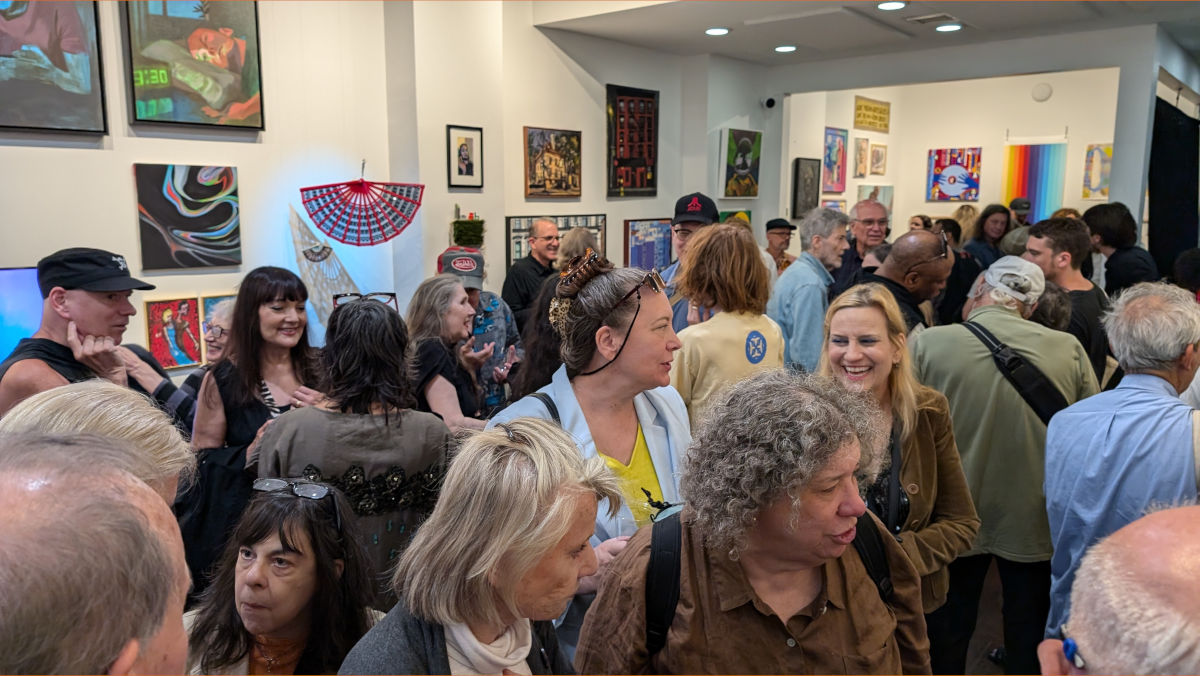
Opening of Framing the Village, the annual Village Trip art exhibition curated by Marc Kehoe, 2024

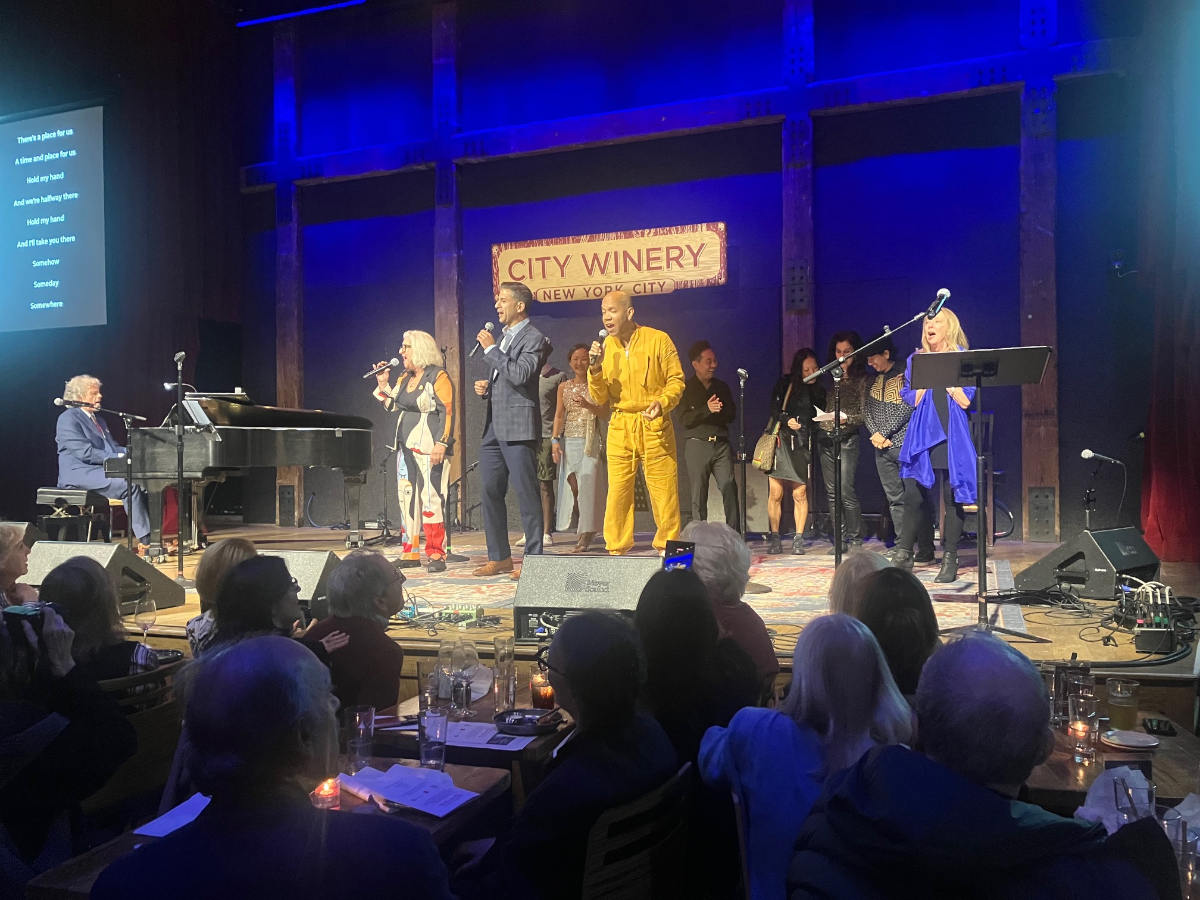
Jamie Bernstein and friends in the finale to Bernstein Remix! at The Village Trip 2025

=== 2018 ===
The inaugural Village Trip was held in September 2018. It included a live concert from Suzanne Vega and Martha Redbone in Washington Square Park and concluded with a hootenanny at The Bitter End featuring Tom Chapin and the Chapin Sisters, Happy Traum, David Massengill, Diana Jones and David Amram.

=== 2019 ===
The second festival took place in September 2019, once more featuring jazz and folk music, but also a concert of Amram’s classical works, as well as discussions, and a writing masterclass led by Adriana Trigiani. Performances at Joe’s Pub featured Shania Twain and Penny Arcade. The concert in Washington Square Park was headlined by Steve Earle, with support from Marc Ribot, and The Tall Pines.

=== 2021 ===
Plans for 2020 were abandoned because of COVID-19, but in 2021 Cliff Pearson, an architectural journalist living in the West Village who felt that an arts festival to rally the neighbourhood following the pandemic would provide a much-needed boost to local business, reached out to Thomson and soon agreed to become joint artistic director. Recognizing that the pandemic would make many people anxious about entering small venues, TVT2021 incorporated a range of outdoor events.

The music programme included concerts showcasing the work of Village composers Harold Meltzer, David del Tredici, and Edgard Varèse and Frank Zappa. An outdoor concert on Eighth Street opened the festival. It featured David Amram with guests Renée Manning, Earl McIntyre, and guitar quartet Bodies Electric. “Bringing It All Back Home to Washington Square” featured Bobby Sanabria and His Multiverse Big Band with guests Janis Siegel of The Manhattan Transfer and Antoinette Montague. Siegel then introduced Thomson and Pearson to it:Jamie Bernstein, who would become a key figure in the festival’s development.

=== 2022 ===
Borough President Mark Levine, attending the 2022 launch at Café Figaro, commented “it’s really good news that The Village Trip is back – bigger than ever and going all the way to the East Village!.. There’s so much amazing, eclectic culture in this community, which block-for-block has more artistic history than almost any other place in America.”

The mix of walks and talks was continued, with Jamie Bernstein’s tour celebrating her father’s musical Wonderful Town. David Amram led the celebrations marking the centennial of the birth of his friend Jack Kerouac with a reading with music of On the Road which took place at the historic Strand Bookstore. The concert in Washington Square featured The Klezmatics with Joshua Nelson, supported by the Reverend Billy and the Church of Stop Shopping.

=== 2023 ===
The 2023 festival opened with a performance of Erik Satie’s Vexations; a piano relay which began at 6am and concluded at 8pm. It featured Joan Forsyth, who conceived the idea, as well as Marilyn Nonken, Adam Tendler, Chester Biscardi and Marc Peloquin, who closed the performance.

The program included a fundraising Ukraine Weekend supported by Veselka, although visa issues prevented some members of the Odessa-based band Kommuna Lux from entering the United States. The weekend also included “Play for Ukraine,” a play-a-thon featuring young classical musicians and special guests Ukrainian Chorus Dumka. Money raised from the weekend was donated to the Ukraine Children’s Action Program.

The signature event of TVT2023 was “Let Freedom Ring! Music and Voices of the March for Civil Rights, Then and Now,” a multimedia event honoring the sixtieth anniversary of the March on Washington, held in the Great Hall at Cooper Union. Peter Yarrow, who had organized the music for the 1963 March, made a guest appearance, leading cast and audience in songs that have become synonymous with the Civil Rights Movement.

=== 2024 ===
The 2024 festival opened with a concert by David Amram as well as Our Band, Avram Pengas, The Fightscuffs and Fabio Fantuzzi. The programme expanded on the themes of previous years and included a Beatnik Greenwich Village Walking Tour. Other activities included the Manhattan première of Curt Hahn’s documentary Lead Belly: The Man Who Invented Rock & Roll, about the life of music icon Huddie "Lead Belly" Ledbetter and the book launch of Talkin' Greenwich Village: The Heady Rise and Slow Fall of America’s Bohemian Music Capital by Rolling Stone’s David Browne at the La Lanterna di Vittorio.

BETTY had originally been scheduled to headline the 2023 open air concert in Washington Square Park, but after bad weather meant that had to be cancelled, they came back to perform at the 2024 concert, along with Jamie Barnett, and Tish and Snooky.

=== 2025 ===
In 2025, The Village Trip celebrated the music and legacy of Leonard Bernstein with two concerts which raised funds for Artful Learning. There were video contributions from Bradley Cooper, Jeremy Irons, and Gustavo Dudamel.

Other performances included baritone James Martin, and pianist Lynn Raley with world premières of works by David Amram, Carman Moore, and Maria Thompson Corley; gamelan music by Gamelan Yowana Sari with guitarists Kyle Miller and Jack Lynch; Damien Sneed and friends; and string quartets Bergamot and ETHEL.

Poetry featured prominently, with Marcos de la Fuente and Annalisa Marí Pegrum declaiming from the Beat poetry catalogue as they led a tour through the movement’s landmarks. Michael Jacobsohn’s documentary The Cornelia Street Café in Exile made its debut at the IFC Center. “Bringing It All Back Home to Washington Square” featured Kennedy Administration supported by Dali Rose.
