= Musée-Placard d'Erik Satie =

Defunct museum in Paris, France

- Established: 1983
- Dissolved: 2008
- Location: 6 Rue Cortot, 75018 Paris, France
- Coordinates: 48.88594°N 2.38803°E
- Type: Private memorabilia collection

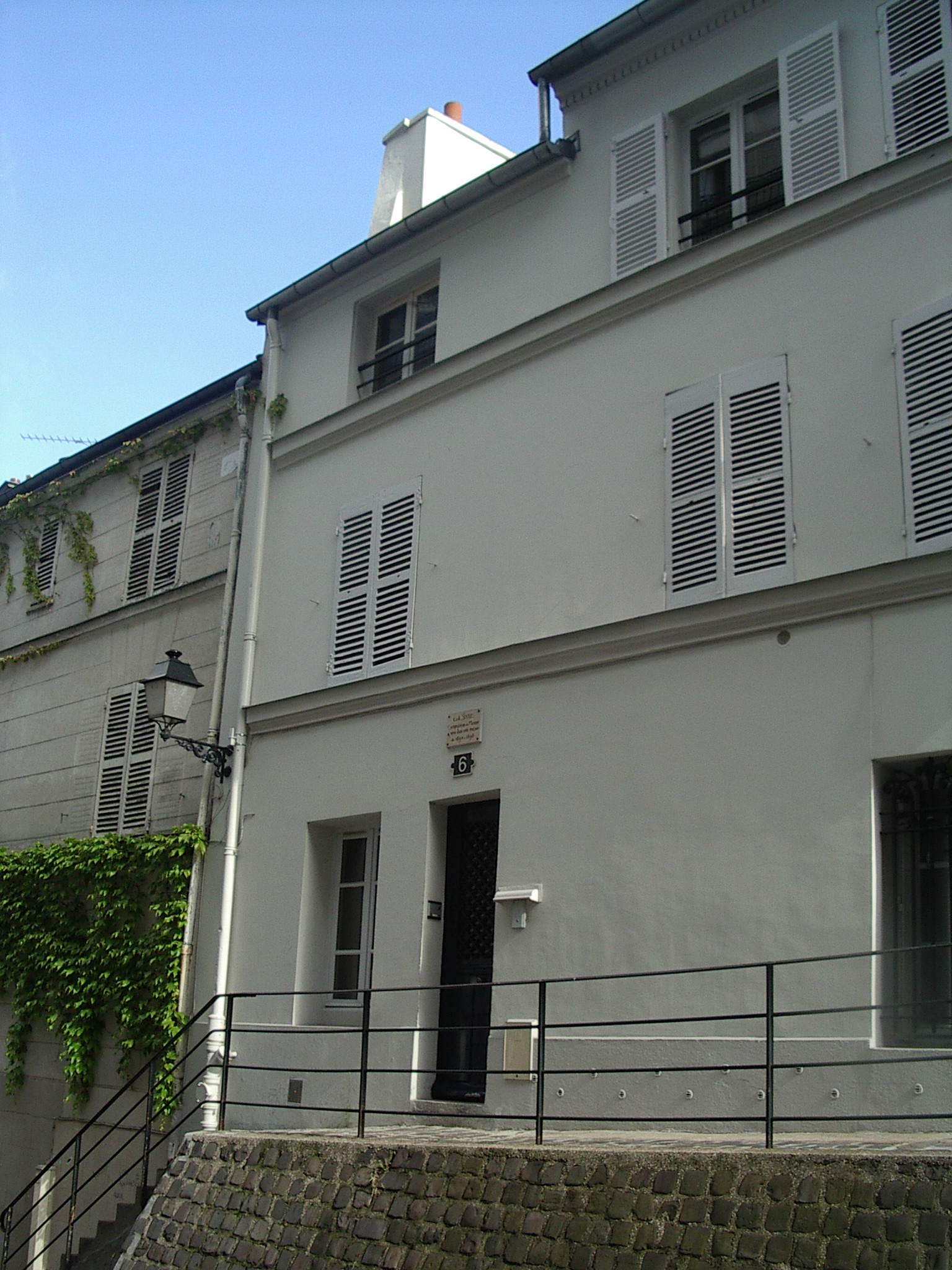
6 Rue Cortot in Montmartre, Paris, where Satie lived from 1890 to 1898. The Musée-Placard d'Erik Satie was located here (1983-2008).

The Musée-Placard d'Erik Satie (Cupboard Museum of Erik Satie) was a miniature museum dedicated to composer Erik Satie (1866–1925). Founded in 1983 and curated by veteran Satie scholar Ornella Volta, it was located in the 18th arrondissement of Paris at 6 Rue Cortot, Montmartre, France.

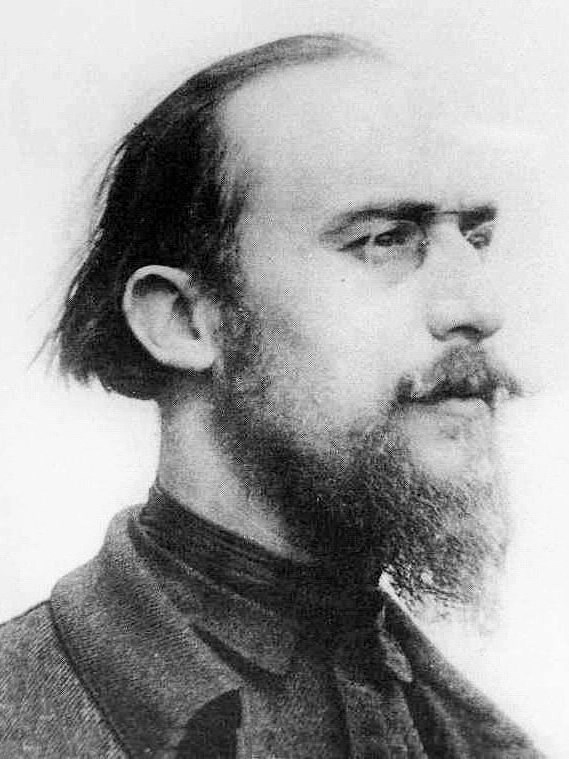
Erik Satie in 1898, when he was living in what he called the "cupboard".

The "cupboard" museum consisted of a small utility room, measuring 3x3 meters (just under 10x10 feet), that Satie lived in from July 1896 to October 1898. From 1890 he had previously occupied a larger room in the same building, but dire poverty forced him to move into this unheated ground floor closet, which the landlord offered him for 20 francs per quarter. The space was so small that Satie's camp bed blocked the door from fully opening, and on frigid nights he kept warm by sleeping fully dressed with the rest of his clothing piled on top of him. He wrote very little music there, primarily the Pièces froides (1897).

Reputedly one of the smallest museums in the world, it was not an actual reconstruction of the composer's prison cell-like living quarters. It displayed items that belonged to Satie, mainly drawings and portraits, as well as an authorized replica of artist Man Ray's readymade sculpture The Gift (1921), the original of which Satie himself helped create. Instead of a bed there was an upright piano, and on one occasion Volta sponsored an 18-hour performance of Satie's piano piece Vexations there. The audience consisted of guests who were allowed into the room two at a time.

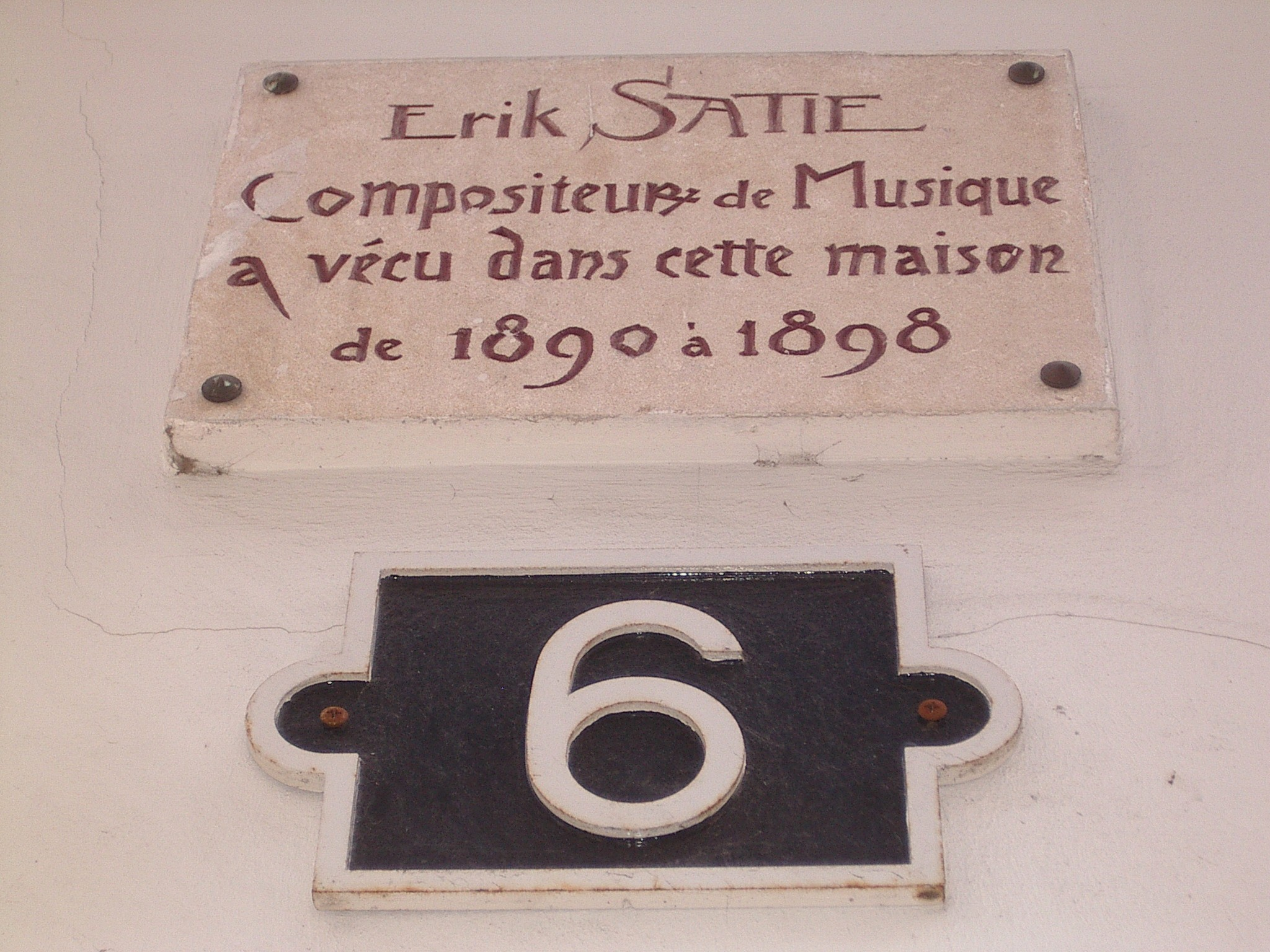
6 Rue Cortot plaque, replicating Satie's calligraphic handwriting.

Due to lack of subsidies, Volta was forced to close the Musée-Placard d'Erik Satie in 2008. She died in 2020 at age 93, having devoted nearly 50 years to researching and writing about Satie's life and works. A commemorative plaque to the composer hangs above the entrance of 6 Rue Cortot.

== See also ==
- List of museums in Paris
- List of music museums
