= Charles Martin (artist) =

French artist and illustrator

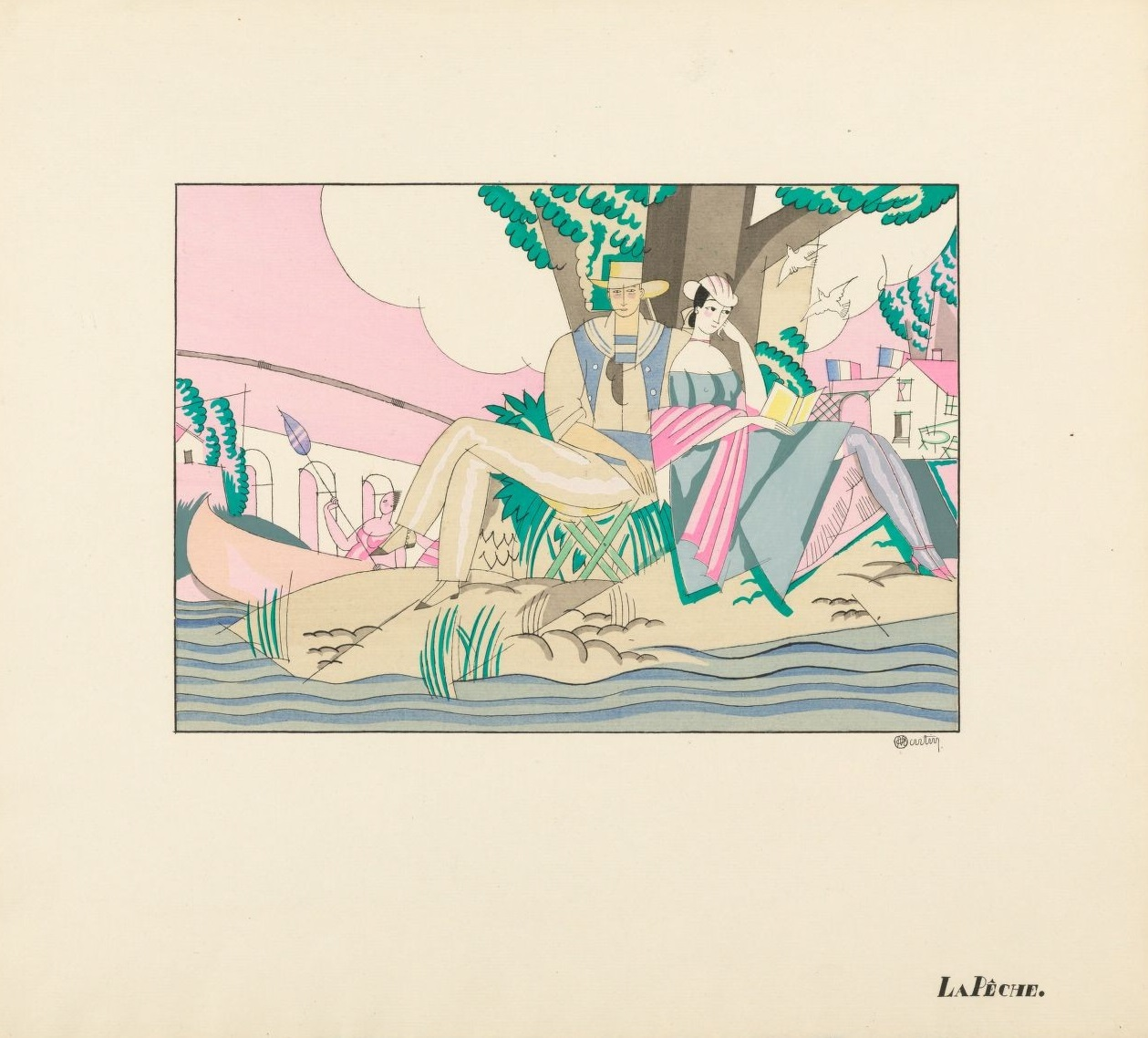
Image from Sports et Divertissements, 1914

Charles Martin (1884–1934) was a French artist and illustrator.

His illustrated books include Les Modes en 1912, a hat collection; the erotic Mascarades et Amusettes and Sports et divertissements (published 1923), a collaboration with composer Erik Satie.
