= Furniture music =

Music genre

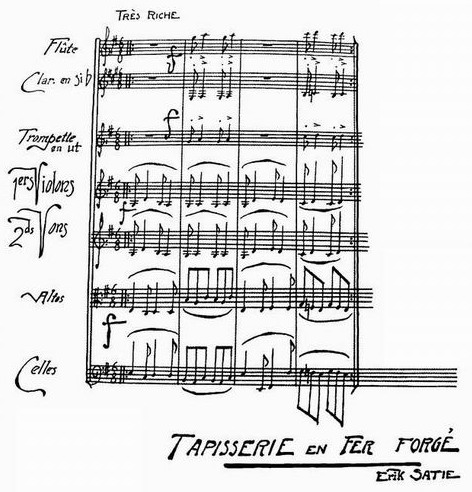
Furniture music: «Tapisserie en Fer forgé», 1924

Furniture music, or in French musique d'ameublement (sometimes more literally translated as furnishing music), is background music originally played by live performers. The term was coined by Erik Satie in 1917.

== Satie's compositions ==
=== The music ===
Although other selections of Erik Satie's music can be experienced (and are sometimes indicated) as furniture music, Satie himself applied the name only to five short pieces, composed in three separate sets:

- 1st set (1917), for flute, clarinet and strings, plus a trumpet for the first piece:
  - 1. Tapisserie en fer forgé – pour l'arrivée des invités (grande réception) – À jouer dans un vestibule – Mouvement: Très riche (Tapestry in forged iron – for the arrival of the guests (grand reception) – to be played in a vestibule – Movement: Very rich)
  - 2. Carrelage phonique – Peut se jouer à un lunch ou à un contrat de mariage – Mouvement: Ordinaire (Phonic tiling – Can be played during a lunch or civil marriage – Movement: Ordinary),
- 2nd set, Sons industriels (Industrial sounds, February/March 1920), for piano duet, 3 clarinets and trombone:
  - Premier Entr'acte: Chez un "Bistrot" (First Entr'acte: At a "Bistro")
  - Second Entr'acte: Un salon (Second Entr'acte: A drawing room)
- 3rd set (1923), commissioned by Mrs Eugène Meyer jr. (living in Washington DC), for small orchestra:
  - Tenture de cabinet préfectoral (Wall-lining in a chief officer's office)

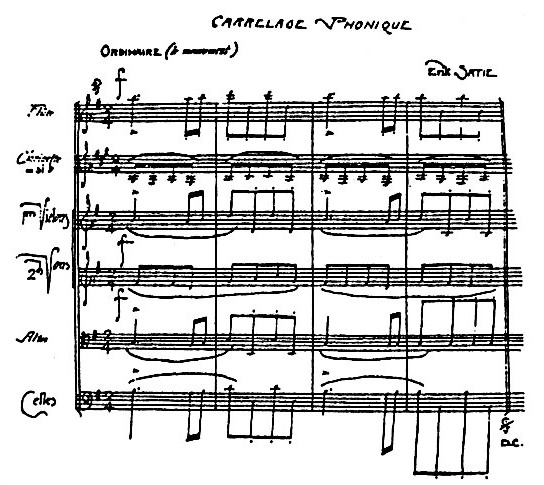
Furniture music: «Carrelage Phonique», 1917

The first set was apparently never performed (nor the score published) during Satie's lifetime.

The second set contained reminiscences of popular tunes by, amongst others, Camille Saint-Saëns and Ambroise Thomas. It was premiered in Paris the year it was composed, as intermission music to a lost comedy by Max Jacob. During these intermissions the audience was invited to visit an exposition of children's drawings in the Galerie Barbazanges that was hosting the premiere.

Indications of the intentions of the artists giving the first performance are found in the manuscript of the score:

Furnishing divertissement organised by the group of musicians known as the "Nouveaux Jeunes"
Furnishing music replaces "waltzes" and "operatic fantasias" etc. Don't be confused! It's something else!!! No more "false music"
Furnishing music completes one's property;
it's new; it doesn't upset customs; it isn't tiring; it's French; it won't wear out; it isn't boring
--quoted in Gillmor, 1988, p 325-326

See also the Entr'acte article for more details regarding the circumstances of this first, and only documented, public performance of furniture music during Satie's lifetime, assisted by the composer himself.

The separate commissioned piece was sent to America. There are no known public performances or publications of this music prior to leaving the European continent. This piece is sometimes presented as furniture music No. 3.

As Satie's pieces of furniture music were very short pieces, with an indefinite number of repeats, this kind of furniture music later became associated with repetitive music (sometimes used as a synonym of minimal music), but this kind of terminology did not yet exist in Satie's time.

=== Publication ===
For a quarter of a century after the composer's death, all of the furniture music pieces remained hidden from the general public, apart from being mentioned in early Satie biographies. By the end of the 1960s parts of the furniture music started to appear as facsimile illustrations to press articles and new Satie biographies. The first full publication of sets 1 and 3 followed in the early 1970s. There was no full publication of the second set before the last years of the 20th century.

== Revival ==
Several decades after Satie's death, furniture music was revived, largely due to the American composer John Cage, as the composer's theory of minimalist background music. Furniture music appeared as the launchpad for minimalist/experimental/avant-garde music since it was the first instance of music being played or produced out of context: not as a centerpiece but as a cerebral backdrop.

These and other related ideas were picked up by several composers of the neoclassical/20th-century school of music, accentuating atmosphere and texture over traditional form and movement. The minimalist references and anachronisms were not solidified until composer John Cage performed Satie's "hidden" piece Vexations 840 times as requested by Satie's own scribbled notes on the original sheet music.

== See also ==
- Ambient music
- Background music
- Lounge music
- New age music
