= The Gift (sculpture) =

Sculpture by Man Ray

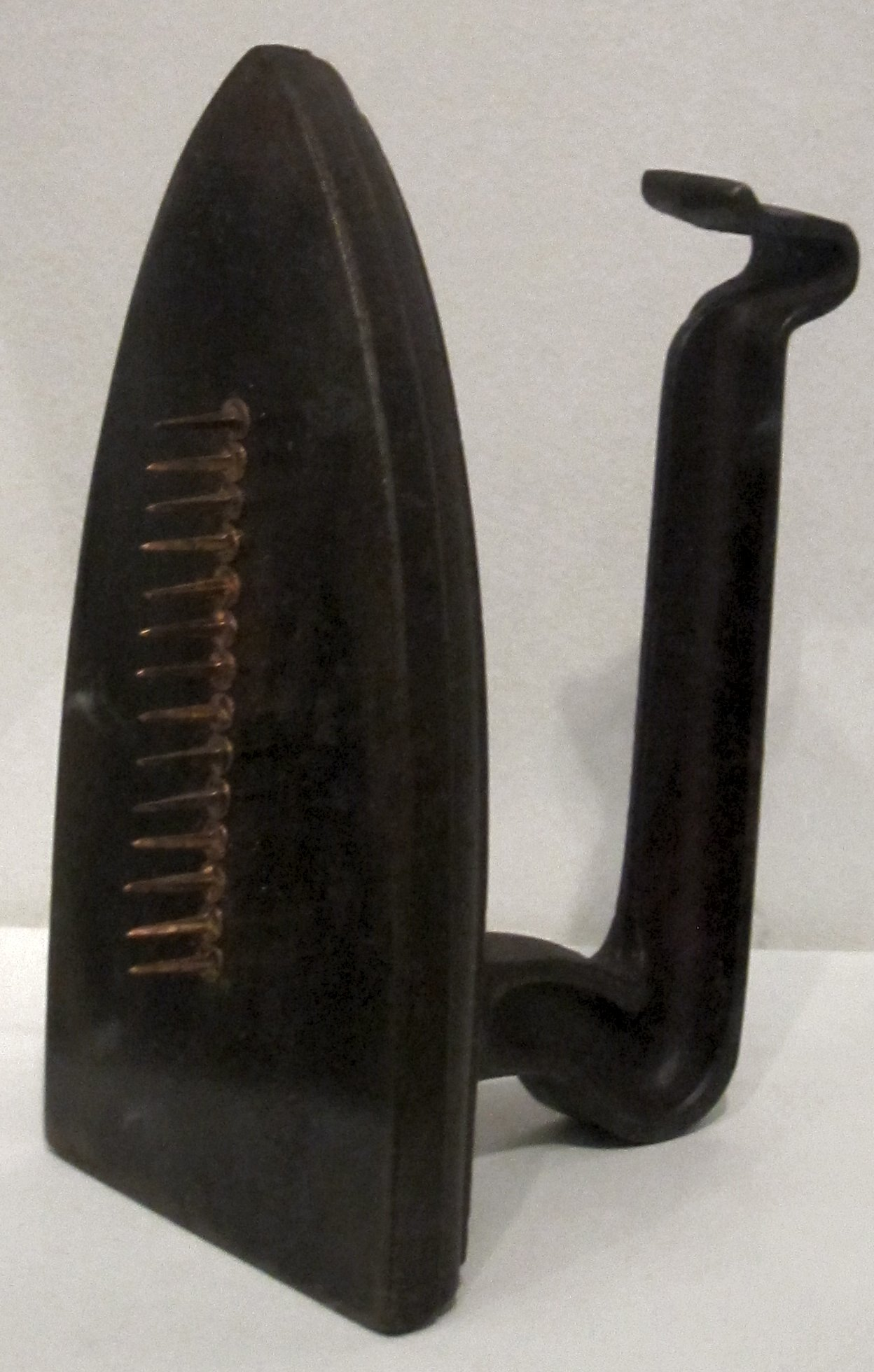
- Replica of Man Ray's The Gift
- Artist: Man Ray
- Medium: Iron
- Movement: Sculpture

The Gift (Le Cadeau in French) is a readymade sculpture by Man Ray, consisting of an iron with fourteen thumb tacks glued to its sole. An iconic work of the Dada movement, it was created spontaneously and exhibited at the opening of Ray's first solo show in Paris, at Phillippe Soupault's Galerie Six on December 3, 1921. The original is lost but its concept survives through later reproductions created or sanctioned by the artist.

In his memoirs Ray recalled how the eccentric French composer Erik Satie, a devoted fan of avant-garde art, played a pivotal role in the work's creation:

A strange voluble little man in his fifties came over to me and led me to one of my paintings.... I was tired with the preparations of the opening, the gallery had no heat, I shivered and said in English that I was cold. He replied in English, took my arm, and led me out of the gallery to a corner café, where he ordered hot grogs. Introducing himself as Erik Satie, he relapsed into French, which I informed him I did not understand. With a twinkle in his eye he said it did not matter. We had a couple of additional grogs; I began to feel warm and lightheaded. Leaving the café, we passed a shop that had various household utensils spread out front. I picked up a flat-iron, the kind used on coal stoves, asked Satie to come inside with me, where, with his help, I acquired a box of tacks and a tube of glue. Back at the gallery I glued a row of tacks to the smooth surface of the iron, titled it 'The Gift', and added it to the exhibition. This was my first Dada object in France.

This productive encounter marked the beginning of a friendship between artist and composer that lasted until Satie's death in 1925.

Ray intended to present The Gift to Phillippe Soupault in gratitude for his sponsorship, but it was stolen from the Galerie Six the same day and never recovered. He went on to create many individual reproductions of the piece throughout his career, and in his last years Ray authorized two limited editions: a series of eleven collector's pieces published by the Galleria Il Fauno, Turin (1972), and a more commercial scale 5000 replicas of The Gift in 1974. One of these replicas was a featured exhibit at the now-defunct Musée-Placard d'Erik Satie in Paris; others are held by the Tate Modern in London, the Museum of Modern Art in New York City, and the Smithsonian American Art Museum in Washington, D.C.
