= Ornella Volta =

French musicologist (1927–2020)

- Born: 1 January 1927; Trieste, Kingdom of Italy
- Died: 16 August 2020 (aged 93); Paris, France
- Occupation: Musicologist

Ornella Volta (1 January 1927 – 16 August 2020) was an Italian-born French musicologist, essayist, and translator.

== Biography ==
A cinematographic journalist and writer, Ornella married her spouse, Pablo Volta in 1957, and the couple moved to Paris. She was a friend of Federico Fellini, with whom she collaborated for the 1970 film I clowns. She carried out research for the film on the circus and produced the French language version of the dialogue. She also served as assistant director of the 1955 film The Belle of Rome, directed by Luigi Comencini. In the 1960s, she published multiple books, such as Vampires parmi nous, Le Vampire, and Frankenstein & Company. She also collaborated with magazines such as Vogue, Quindici, and Il Delatore.

Volta devoted nearly 50 years of her life to researching and writing about the life and works of composer Erik Satie. In 1981 she established the Fondation Erik Satie at her home in Paris, and in 1983 she became the founder-curator of the Musée-Placard d'Erik Satie (Cupboard Museum of Erik Satie), located in a tiny room Satie occupied in Montmartre during the late 1890s. Reputedly one of the smallest museums in the world, it exhibited items belonging to Satie, mainly drawings and paintings, as well as an artist-authorized replica of Man Ray's sculpture The Gift (1921). Volta was forced to close the museum in 2008 due to lack of subsidies.

In 2000, Volta donated a large collection of Satie's works to the French National Archives, which entrusted their conservation to the Institute for Contemporary Publishing Archives. She also organized numerous exhibitions dedicated to Satie, including the foundation of Erik Satie : les Maisons Satie in Honfleur in 1998.

Musicologist Robert Orledge dedicated his book Satie the Composer (1990), a major work in Satie studies, to Ornella Volta. She was a member of the Carnets de l'Iliad-Club and a Regent of 'Pataphysics. Volta died on 16 August 2020 in Paris at the age of 93. At the time she was editing a new version of her book Erik Satie, Correspondance presque complète (2000).

== Bibliography ==
=== General works ===
- Le vampire : la mort, le sang, la peur (1962)
- Brèves rencontres avec André Breton, avec vingt-deux photographies de Pablo Volta (2003)

=== On Erik Satie ===
- Écrits (1977)
- Erik Satie (1979)
- L'Ymagier d'Erik Satie (1979)
- Volta, Ornella (1989). Satie Seen Through His Letters. Translated by Bullock, Michael. Marion Boyars. ISBN 0-7145-2811-0.
- Satie et la danse (1992)
- Satie/Cocteau : les malentendus d'une entente (1993)
- Erik Satie (1997)
- Le Piège de Méduse (1998)
- La banlieue d'Erik Satie (1999)
- Erik Satie, Correspondance presque complète (2000)

== Expositions ==
- Satie op papier (1976)
- Erik Satie à Montmartre (1982–1983)
- Erik Satie et la tradition populaire (1988)
- Le Groupe des Six et ses amis (1990)
- Erik Satie. Bibliographie raisonnée. Première exposition bibliographique autour d'Erik Satie (1995)
- Erik Satie del Chat Noir a Dadá (1996)
- Erik Satie de Montmartre à Montparnasse (2000)
- Satie sur scène (2000)
- Variations Satie (2000)

== Distinctions ==
- Prix Sévigné (2001)
