= Adam Tendler =

American pianist

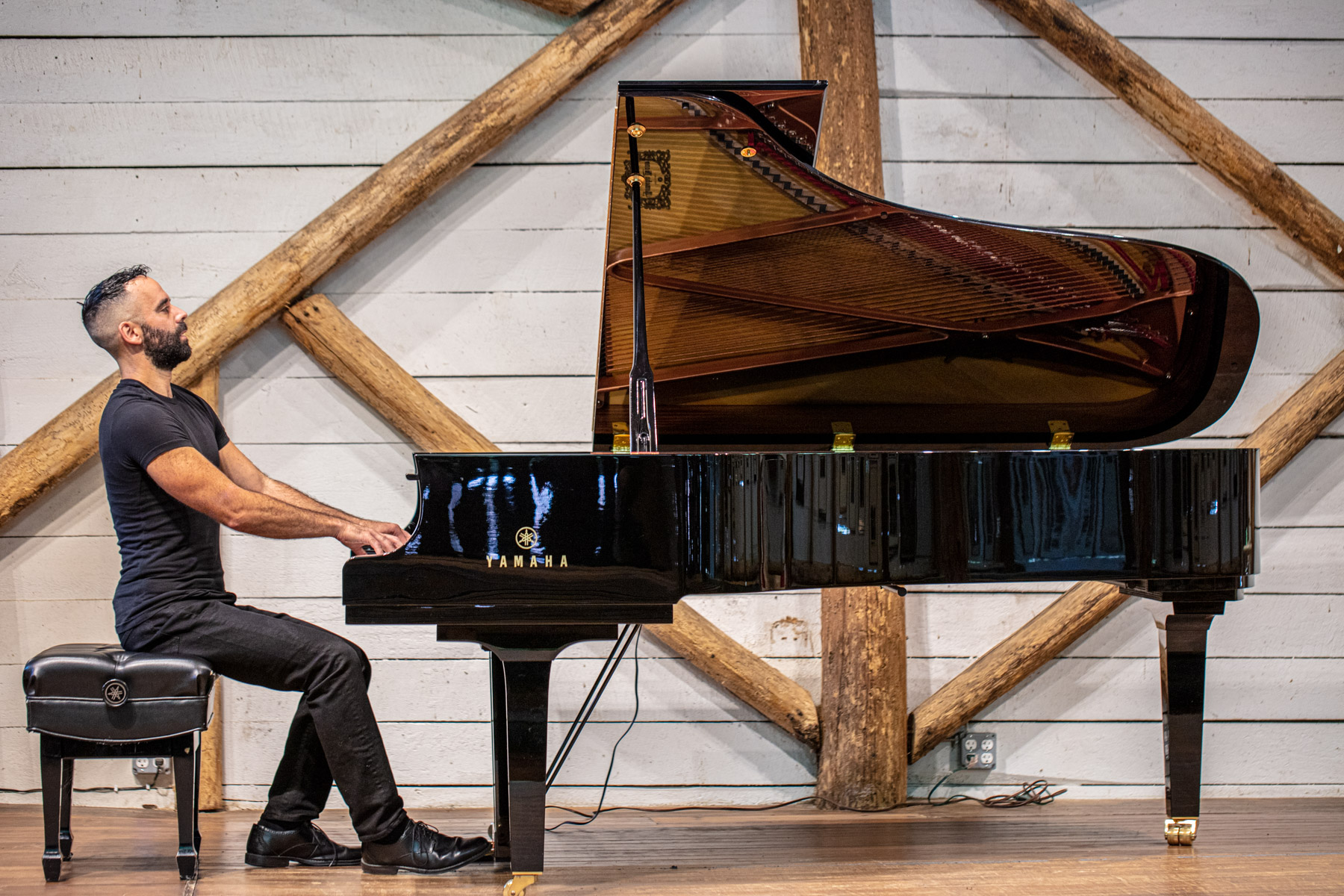

Background information
- Born: Barre, Vermont, U.S.
- Genres: Classical
- Occupation: Musician
- Instrument: Piano
- Years active: 1999–present
- Label: Independent

Adam Tendler is an American pianist. He received a Grammy nomination for Best Classical Instrumental Solo for his album Inheritances in 2025. He serves on the piano faculty at New York University's Steinhardt School.

== Life and career ==
Tendler was born in Barre, Vermont. He earned a bachelor's degree in piano performance from the Indiana University Jacobs School of Music. In 2009, he launched America 88x50, a self-organized tour of solo piano concerts in all fifty U.S. states. The project inspired his memoir 88x50, which was nominated for a Lambda Literary Award.

Tendler has appeared as a soloist with the London Symphony Orchestra, Los Angeles Philharmonic, Sydney Symphony Orchestra, Toronto Symphony Orchestra, and others. He has commissioned works from composers such as Christian Wolff, Dev Hynes, Nico Muhly, Missy Mazzoli and Laurie Anderson. He has also contributed essays to The New York Times and New Music USA.

In 2019, following his father's death, Tendler used a cash inheritance to commission sixteen new short works for solo piano. The resulting program, Inheritances, premiered in 2022 and has been performed across the United States and Canada. It premiered in 2023 and has been performed across the United States. A recording was released by New Amsterdam Records in December 2024 and received a 2025 Grammy nomination for Best Classical Instrumental Solo.

Tendler was artist-in-residence at Green-Wood Cemetery in Brooklyn from 2023 to 2024. As part of the residency, he created Exit Strategy, a site-specific multimedia installation presented at the cemetery's Fort Hamilton Gatehouse.

== Publications ==
- 2013 – 88x50: A Memoir of Sexual Discovery, Modern Music, and the United States of America
- 2024 – tidepools

== Selected discography ==
- 2005: Selected Live Performances
- 2008: Autumn Lines
- 2014: 88X50
- 2015: Solo and Chamber Music By Edward T. Cone
- 2019: Robert Palmer: Piano Music (New World Records)
- 2020: Franz Liszt: Harmonies poétiques et religieuses (with Jenny Lin, Steinway & Sons)
- 2023: Julius Eastman Vol. 3: If You’re So Smart, Why Aren't You Rich? (New Amsterdam Records)
- 2024: Inheritances (New Amsterdam Records)

== Accolades ==
- 2014: Lambda Literary Award nominee
- 2019: Lincoln Center's Emerging Artist Award
- 2022: Yvar Mikhashoff's Prize
- 2025: Grammy Nomination, Best Classical Instrumental Solo
