= History of music in Paris =

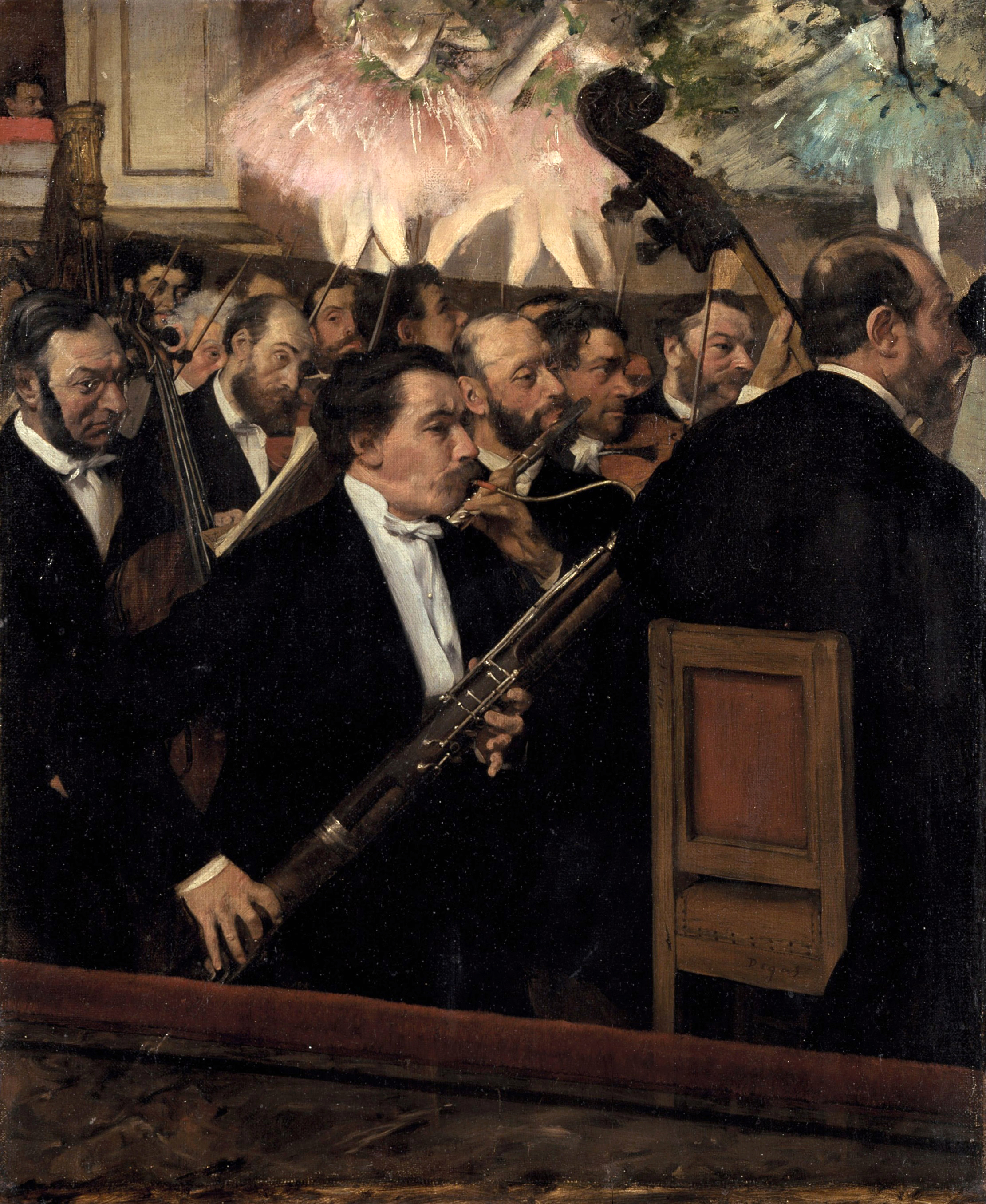
Orchestra of the Paris Opera, by Edgar Degas (1870)

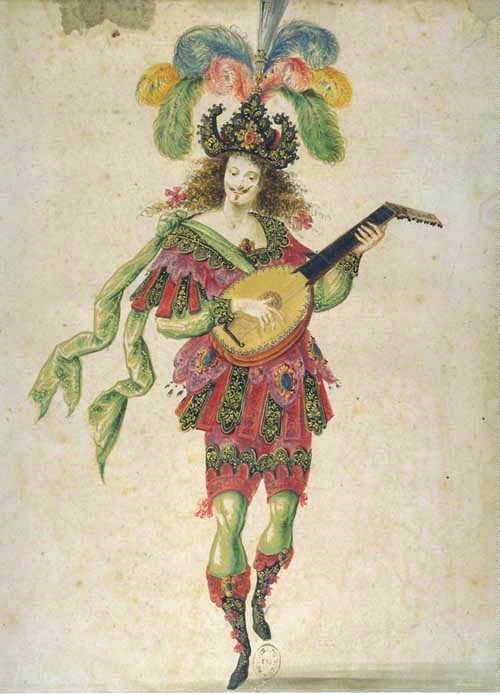
Lute player from the Ballet de la Nuit (1653)

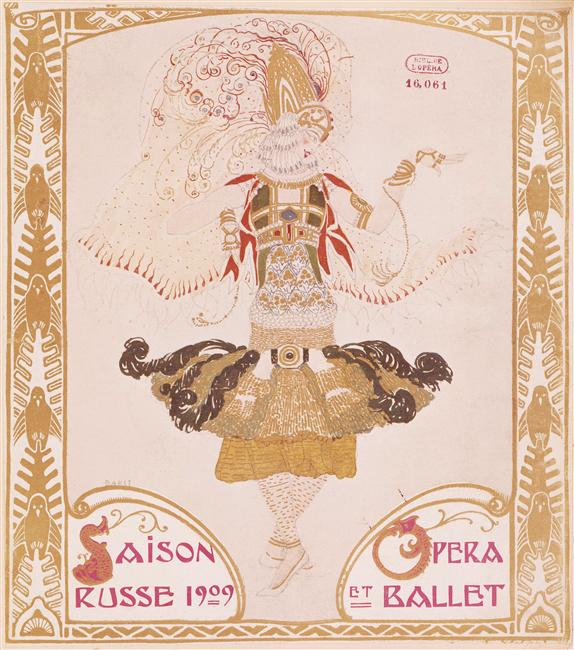
Poster for the Ballets Russes (1909)

The city of Paris has been an important center for European music since the Middle Ages. It was noted for its choral music in the 12th century, for its role in the development of ballet during the Renaissance, in the 19th century it became famous for its music halls and cabarets, and in the 20th century for the first performances of the Ballets Russes, its jazz clubs, and its part in the development of serial music. Paris has been home to many important composers, including: Léonin, Pérotin, Jean-Baptiste Lully, Jean-Philippe Rameau, Christoph Willibald Gluck, Niccolò Piccinni, Frédéric Chopin, Franz Liszt, Jacques Offenbach, Georges Bizet, Claude Debussy, Maurice Ravel, Hector Berlioz, Paul Dukas, Gabriel Fauré, César Franck, Charles Gounod, Jules Massenet, Vincent d'Indy, Camille Saint-Saëns, Erik Satie, Igor Stravinsky, Sidney Bechet.

== Music of medieval Paris ==
=== The cathedral schools and choral music ===
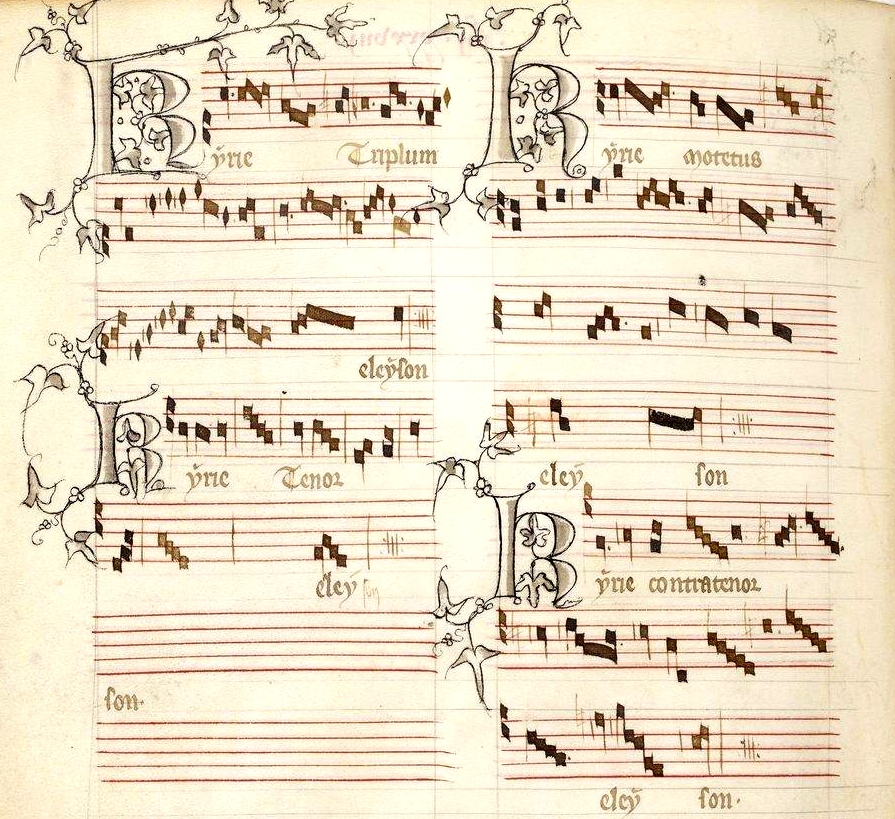
Kyrie from Messe de Nostre Dame composed by Guillaume de Machaut, about 1350

In the Middle Ages, music was an important part of the ceremony in Paris churches and at the royal court. The Emperor Charlemagne had founded a school at the first cathedral of Notre Dame in 781, whose students chanted during the mass; and the court also had a school, the schola palatina, which traveled wherever the imperial court went, and whose students took part in the religious services at the Royal Chapel. Large monasteries were founded on the Left Bank at Saint-Germain-des-Prés, Sainte-Geneviève, and Saint-Victor, which taught the art of religious chanting, adding more elaborate rhythms and rimes. When the new Cathedral of Notre Dame de Paris was constructed, the Notre Dame school became famous for its innovations in vocal counterpoint, or polyphony. The Archdeacon Albert of the Notre Dame school became famous for composing the first known work for three voices, each chanting a different part at the same time. Another famous teacher at the Notre Dame school, Pérotin, composed for four different voices, with highly complex rhythms, blending all the voices together in ways never heard before. In the 13th century, the monks of the Notre Dame school developed an even more complex form, the motet, or "little word"; short pieces for two or three voices, each chanting different words, and sometimes in different languages. The motet became so popular that it was used in non-religious music, in the court and even by musicians and singers on the streets.

A second important music school was established at the Sainte-Chapelle, the royal chapel on the Île de la Cité. Its choir had twenty-five persons, both men and boys, who were taught chanting and vocal techniques. The music of the religious schools became popular outside the churches; the melodies of chants were adapted for popular songs, and sometimes popular song melodies were adapted for church use.

Prior to the ninth century there were no written manuscripts of liturgy related to music. The Gallic music of the churches of Gaul was replaced by the plain songs traced to Rome.

In the late 12th century, a school of polyphony was established at Notre-Dame. A group of Parisian aristocrats, known as trouvères, became known for their poetry and songs. Choral polyphony is a musical genre which was introduced in the 15th century in the Western church music culture. At Notre-Dame, this culture became intertwined as its construction progressed. Composition of music and poetry was a culture that prevailed in the cathedral among its canons and dignitaries.

In the cathedral, polyphony and organ music were reserved for solemn occasions at a time when acoustics were not well developed. Organizing of the music group in the cathedral was such that the polyphonic vocal choir singing musicians were set behind the tapestries whereas the organ was placed in the nave. Before the 16th century all music performed in the cathedral was a cappella, except for use of organ while chanting.

One of the most famous composers of the 14th century was Guillaume de Machaut, who was also renowned as a poet. A canon at Notre-Dame de Reims, he composed a famous mass, the Messe de Nostre Dame, or Mass of our Lady, in about 1350, for four voices. Some of his motets use texts by Philip the Chancellor. Besides church music, he wrote popular songs in the style of the troubadours and trouvères.

=== Street singers and minstrels ===
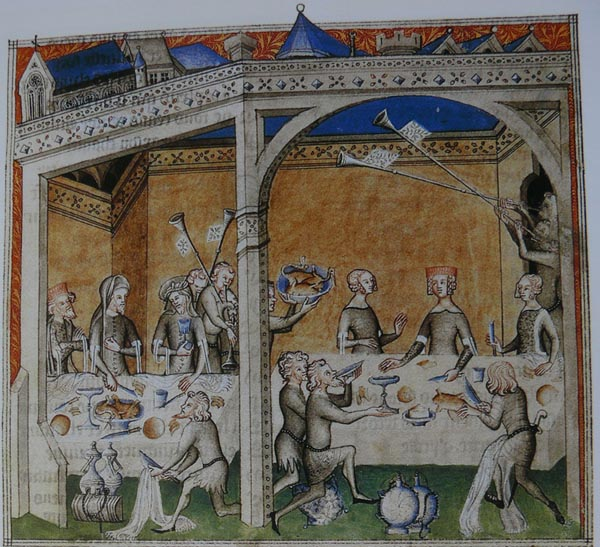
Jongleurs and minstrels at a wedding banquet (1350–55) (French National Library)

The crowds on the streets, squares and markets of Paris were often entertained by singers of different kinds. The goliards were non-conformist students at the religious colleges, who led a bohemian life, and earned money for food and lodging by reciting poems and singing improvised songs, either love songs or satirical songs, accompanying themselves on medieval instruments. The trouvéres sang popular songs, romantic or humorous, largely borrowed in style and content from the troubadours of southern France. They often entertained crowds gathered on the Petit Pont, the bridge connecting the Île de la Cité with the left bank. They introduced a particular form, the rondeau, a round song. The Jongleurs were famous for burlesque songs, making fun of the merchants, clergy, and the nobility. Some of them became immensely popular, and received lodging and gifts from the nobles they amused.

The Menestrels, (Minstrels), were usually street singers who had established a more professional means of living, entertaining in the palaces or residences of noble and wealthy Parisians. In 1321, thirty-seven minstrels and jongleurs formed a professional guild, the Confrérie de Saint-Julien des ménétriers, the first union of musicians in Paris. Most of them played instruments: the violin, flute, hautbois, or tambourine. They played at celebrations, weddings, meetings, holiday events, and royal celebrations and processions. By their statutes enacted in 1341, no musician could play on the streets without their permission. In order to become a member, a musician had to be an apprentice for six years. At the end of the six years, the apprentice had to audition for a jury of master musicians. By 1407, the rules of the Confrérie were applied to all of France.

Musicians were also an important part of court life. The court of Queen Anne of Brittany, wife of Charles VIII of France, in 1493 included three well-known composers of the period: Antonius Divitis, Jean Mouton, and Claudin de Sermisy, as well as a tambourine player, a lute player, two singers, a player of the rebec (a three-stringed instrument like a violin), an organist, and a player of the manichordion, as well as three minstrels from Brittany.

== Music of Renaissance Paris (16th century) ==
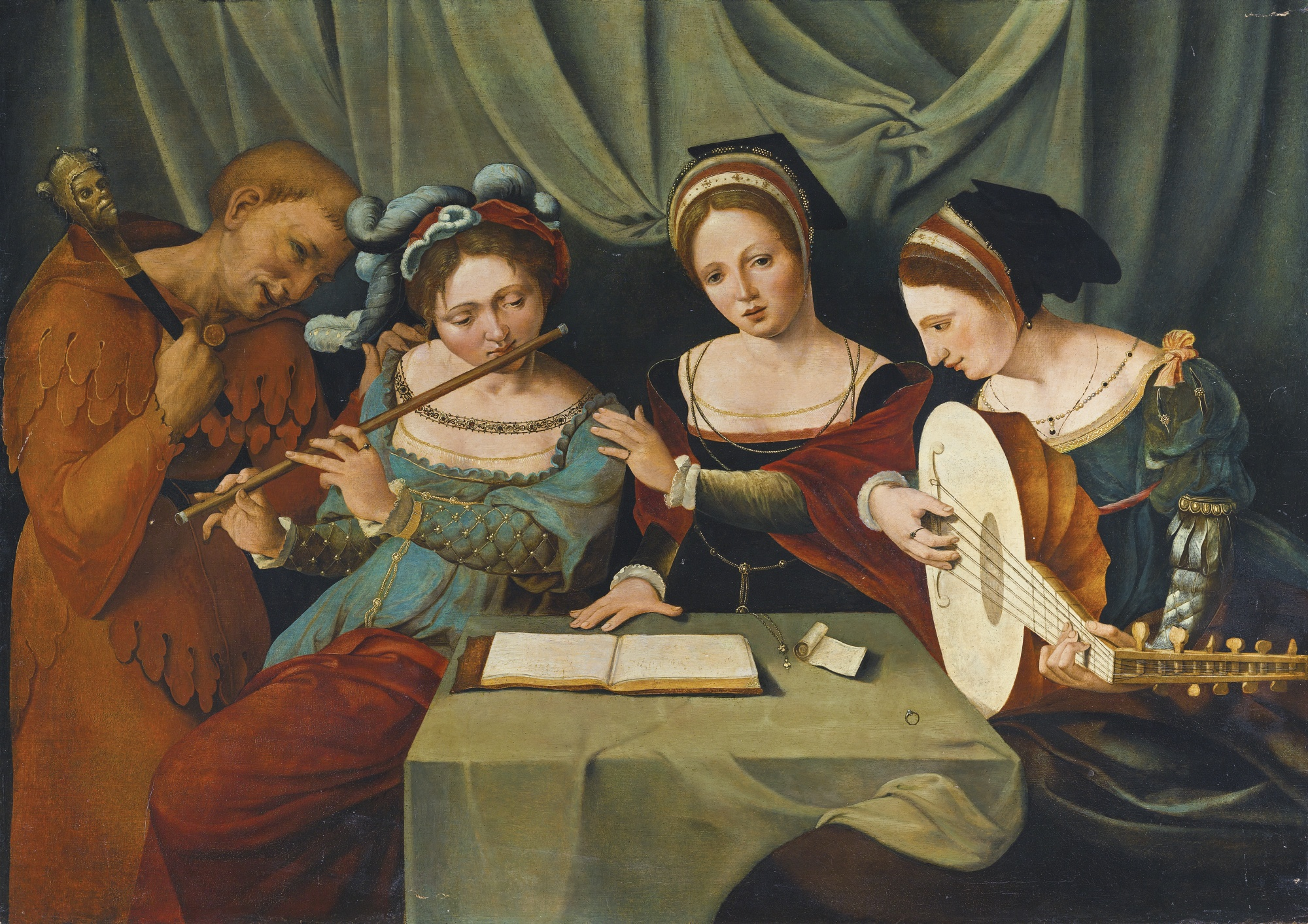
Three young women making music, with a jester (about 1580)

At the death of Charles VI in Paris in 1422, during the devastating Hundred Years' War which ended in 1453, the city had been occupied by the English and their Burgundian allies since 1418. The new (disinherited) French king, Charles VII, had his court established in Bourges, south of the Loire Valley, and did not return to his capital before liberating it in 1436. His successors chose to live in the Loire Valley, and rarely visited Paris. However, in 1515, after his coronation in Reims, king Francis I made his grand entrance in Paris and, in 1528, announced his intention to return the royal court there, and began reconstructing the Louvre as the royal residence in the capital. He also imported the Renaissance musical styles from Italy, and recruited the best musicians and composers in France for his court. La Musique de la Grande Écurie ("Music of the Great Stable") was organized in 1515 to perform at royal ceremonies outdoors. It featured haut, or loud instruments, including trumpets, fifes, cornets, drums, and later, violins. A second ensemble, La musique de la Chambre du Roi ("Music of the King's Chamber") was formed in 1530, with bas or quieter instruments, including violas, flutes and lutes. A third ensemble, the oldest, the Chapelle royale, which performed at religious services and ceremonies, was also reformed on Renaissance models.

Another important revolution in music was brought about by the invention of the printing press; the first printed book of music was made in 1501 in Venice. The first printed book of music in France was made in Paris by Pierre Attaingnant; his printing house became the royal musical house in 1538. After his death, Robert Ballard became the royal music printer. Ballard established a shop in Paris in 1551. The most popular musical instrument for wealthy Parisians to play was the lute, and Ballard produced dozens of books of lute songs and airs, as well as music books for masses and motets, and pieces from Italy and Spain.

The most popular genre in Paris was the chanson: hundreds of them were written on love, work, battles, religion, and nature. Mary, Queen of Scots and wife of king Francis II wrote a song of mourning for the loss of her husband, and French poets, including Pierre de Ronsard and Joachim du Bellay, had their sonnets and odes put to music. The most popular composers of songs included Clément Janequin, who wrote some two hundred and fifty pieces, and became Court composer, and Pierre Certon, who was a cleric at the Sainte-Chapelle while he wrote some three hundred chansons, ranging from religious and courtly music to popular melodies, such as the famous Sur le Pont d'Avignon. In the second part of the century, a variation of the chanson, the air de cour or simply air (melody), became popular. Airs were lighter in subject, and were accompanied by a lute. They became immensely popular in Paris.

=== The Reformation and religious music ===
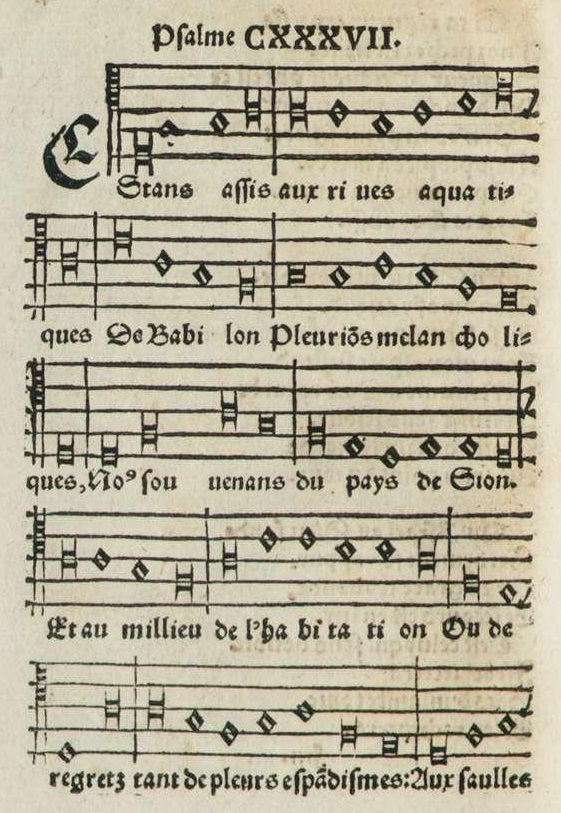
A Protestant Huguenot book of psalms in French, set to music (1539)

The movement of Protestant Reformation, led by Martin Luther in the Holy Roman Empire and John Calvin in France, had an important impact on music in Paris. Under Calvin's direction, between 1545 and 1550 books of psalms were translated from Latin into French, turned into songs, and sung at reformed services in Paris. The Catholic establishment reacted fiercely to the new movement; the songs were condemned by the College of Sorbonne, the fortress of orthodoxy, and in 1549 one Protestant tailor in Paris, Jacques Duval, was burned at the stake, along with his song book. When the campaign against the new songs proved ineffective, the Catholic Church, at the Council of Trent (1545-1563) which launched the Counter-Reformation, also launched a musical counter-reformation. It was calling for an end to complex but unintelligible chants, simpler melodies, and more serious and elevated lyrics.

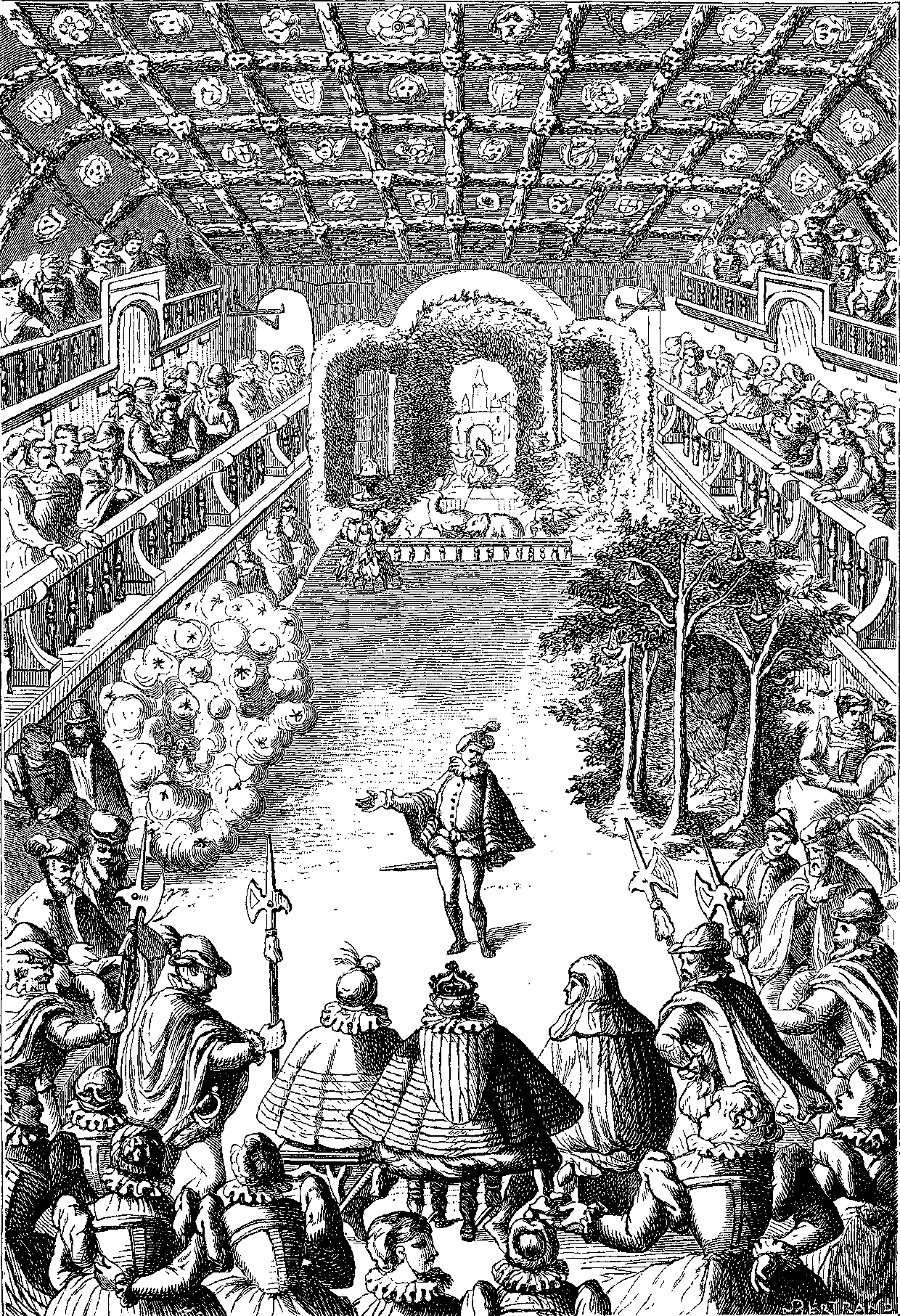
Ballet performance at the Louvre (1582)

=== Music and the first theater companies ===
The beginning of the 16th century saw the first theater performances in Paris, which frequently included music and songs. An amateur theater group called the Confrérie de la Passion was periodically performing Passion Plays, based on the Passion of Jesus, in a large hall on the ground floor of the Hospital of the Trinity (Hôpital de la Trinité) on rue Saint-Denis, where it remained until 1539. In 1543, the group bought one of the buildings attached to the Hôtel de Bourgogne at 23 rue Étienne-Marcel, which became the first permanent theater in the city. The church authorities in Paris denounced Passion and religious mystery plays, which they banned in 1548. The Confrérie rented out its theater to visiting theater troupes, notably an English company directed by Jean Sehais, an Italian company called the Comici Gelosi ("Jealous Comedians"), and a French company headed by Valleran Le Conte.

=== New instruments and the guild of instrument-makers ===
The Renaissance saw a great increase in the number and quality of musical instruments: the harp, violin and flute were produced with many new variations, the seven-string guitar appeared, and the lute, which was based on the oud, an Arab instrument brought to the Iberian Peninsula during the Moorish invasions. The trumpet evolved to something similar to its present form. Powerful organs were built for Paris churches, as well as smaller portable organs and the clavichord, ancestor of the piano. The lute, most often used to accompany songs, became the instrument of choice for minstrels and musically inclined aristocrats. In 1597, there were so many different instrument-makers in Paris that they, like the minstrels, were organized into a guild, which required six years of apprenticeship and the presentation of a master-work to be accepted as a full member.

=== Dance and ballet ===
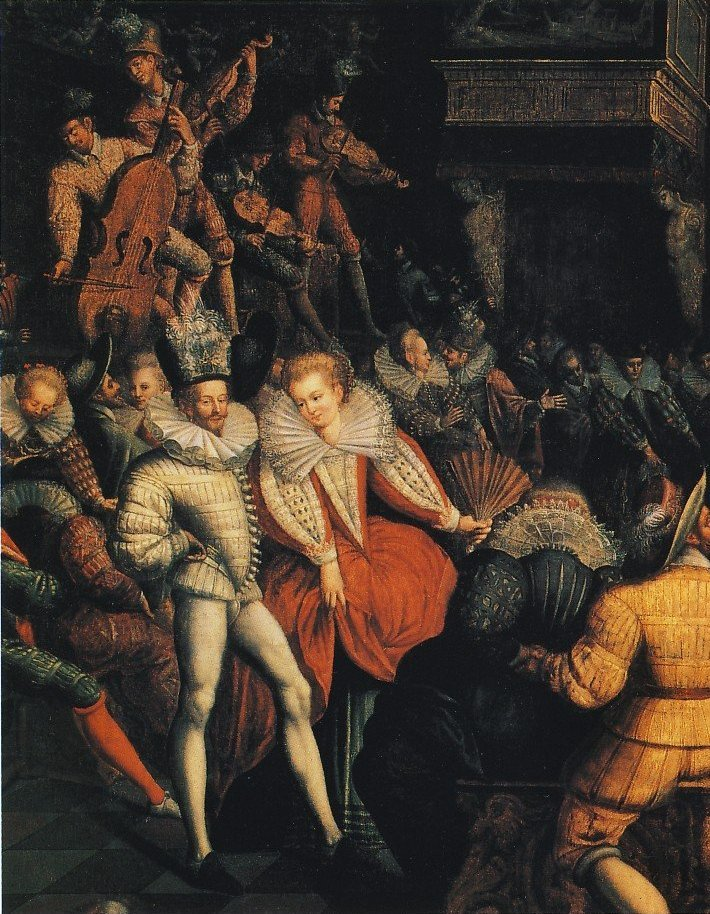
A ball at the Valois Court (about 1580)

Dance was also an important part of court life. The first French book of dance music was published in 1531 in Paris, with the title: "Fourteen gaillardes, nine pavanes, seven branles and two basses-danses". These French dance books, called Danceries, were circulated all over Europe. The names of the composers were rarely credited, with the exception of Jean d'Estrée, a member of the royal orchestra, who published four books of his dances in Paris between 1559 and 1574.

At the end of the 16th century, the ballet became popular at the French court. Ballets were performed to celebrate weddings and other special occasions. The first performance of Circé by Balthasar de Beaujoyeulx was performed at the Louvre Palace on September 24, 1581, to celebrate the wedding of Anne de Joyeuse, a royal favourite of Henry III, with Marguerite de Vaudémont. Ballets at the French royal court combined elaborate costumes, dance, singing, and comedy. During the reign of Henry IV, ballets were often comic or exotic works; those performed during his reign included "The Ballet of the fools", "The Ballet of the drunkards", "The Ballet of the Turks", and "The Ballet of the Indians".

== 17th century - royal court music, ballet and opera ==
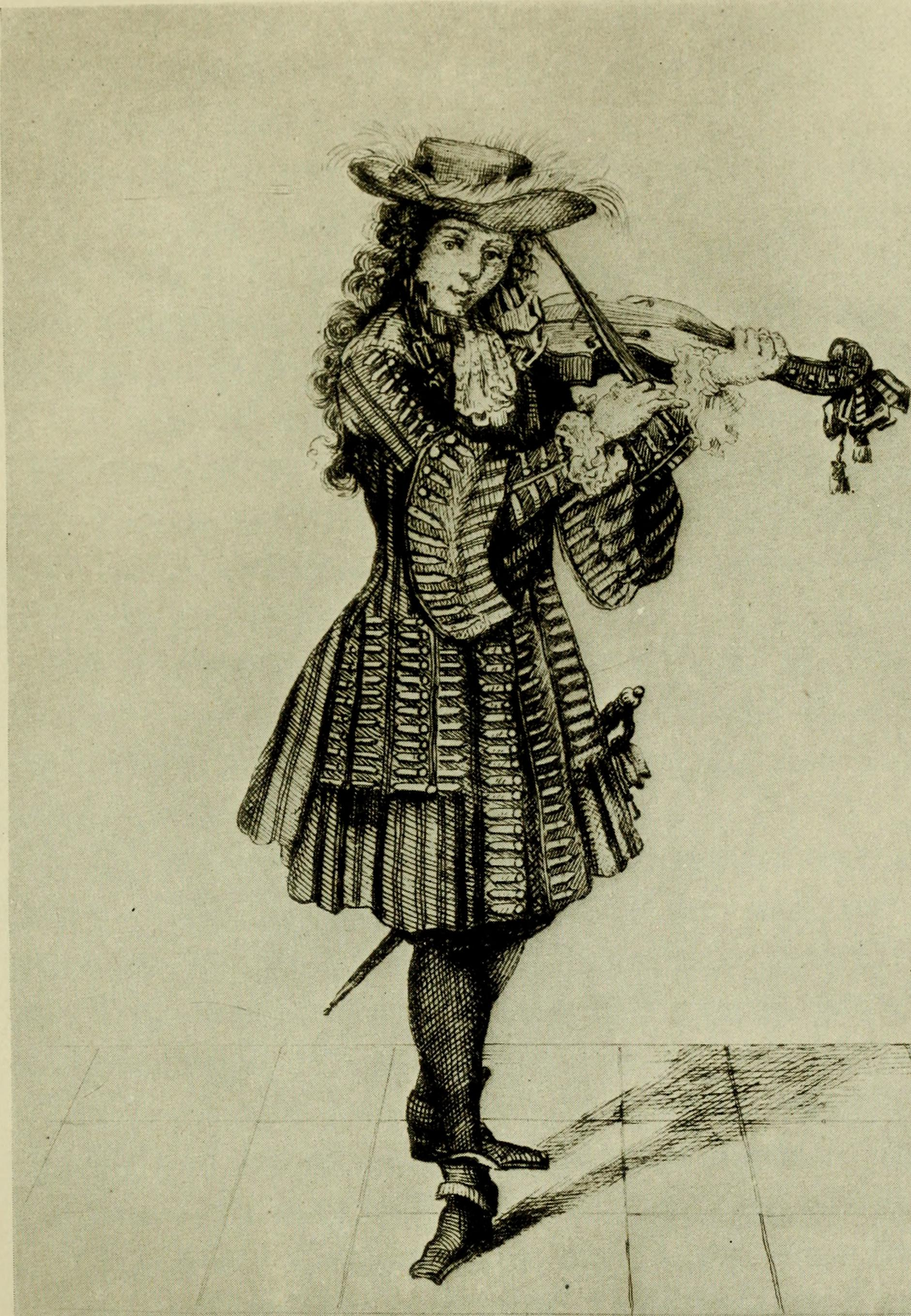
One of the twenty-four violinists of the King, the first permanent court orchestra

In the 17th century, music played an important part at the French royal court; there was no day without music. Louis XIII composed songs, and in 1618 organized the first permanent orchestra in France, called La Grande Bande or the Twenty-four ordinary violins of the King, who performed for royal balls, celebrations, and official ceremonies. His son, Louis XIV, an accomplished musician, was taught the guitar and the harpsichord by the best musicians of the period. In 1647, Jean-Baptiste Lully was brought to Paris from his native Florence to be in the service of La Grande Mademoiselle. In early 1653, he caught the attention of Louis XIV, who named him court composer for instrumental music. Under Lully, music became not simply entertainment, but an expression of royal majesty and power.The royal ministers, Cardinals Richelieu and Mazarin encouraged the development of French music in place of the Italian style.

In the families of the nobles and the wealthy, children were taught to sing and to play musical instruments, such as harp, flute, guitar, and harpsichord, either in the convent schools, or at home with private tutors. Louis XIV established the Royal Academy of Music (Académie royale de musique) in 1672, and commissioned Lully to create a music school, but a school for opera singers in Paris was not opened until 1714, and its quality was very poor; it closed in 1784. One notable music teacher and composer was Jacques Champion de Chambonnières, Louis XIV's harpsichord teacher, whose compositions established the French school of harpsichord music.

The Air de Cour, or Court Air, became very popular in the early 17th century, during the reign of Louis XIII, both at the royal court and in the palaces of the nobility and the wealthy. It was designed to be sung in a large room (chamber) where the nobility entertained their intimate friends. They usually were improvised songs on the themes of gallantry and love, in the form of a dialogue, performed with the lute and the théorbe. The composer Pierre Guédron, music teacher to the children of the King, published several books of court airs, and trained Angélique Paulet, the most famous Parisian singer of the early 17th century. The published songs were learned and sung by both nobles and wealthy Parisians.

=== Italian opera under Mazarin ===
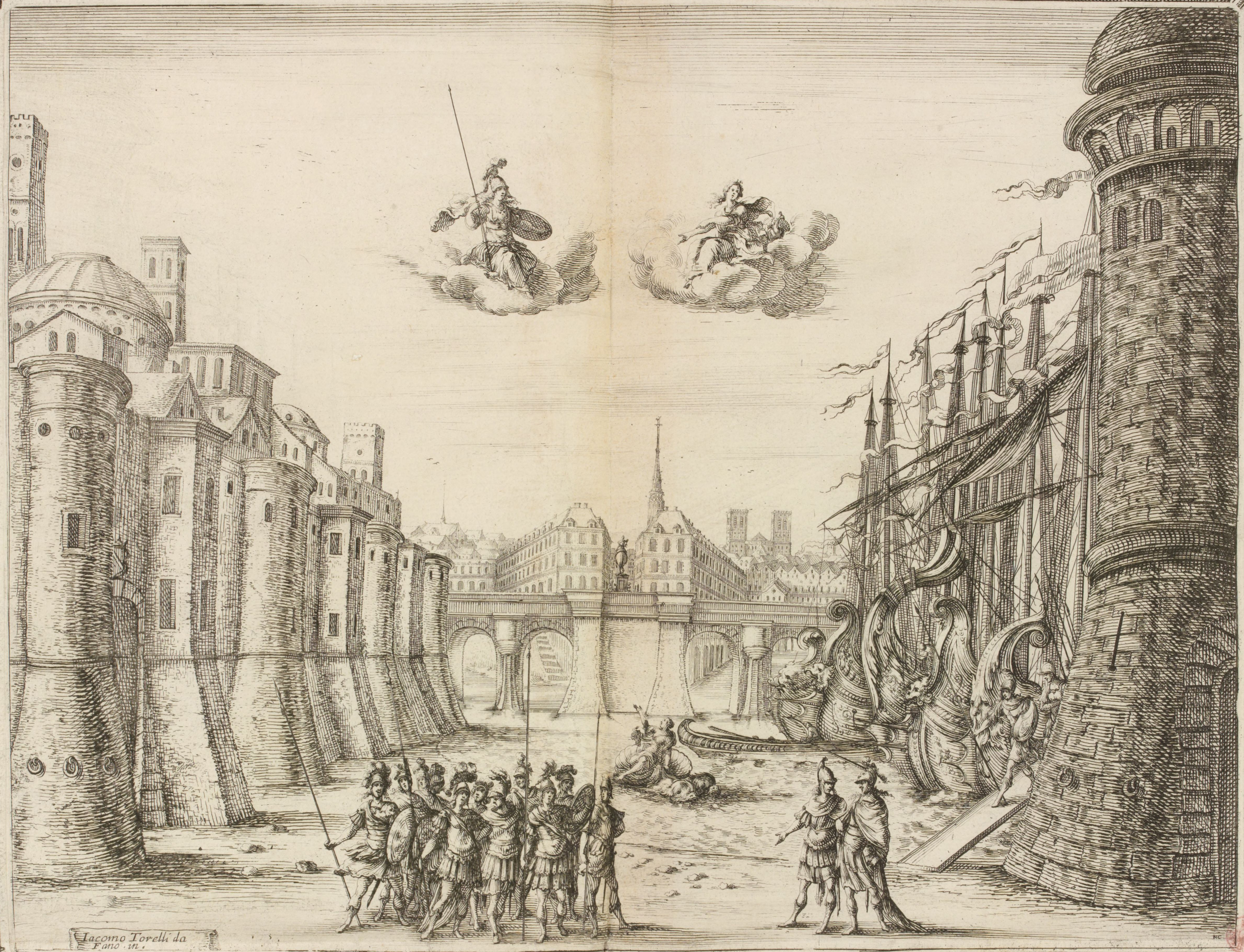
Set by Torelli for La finta pazza, an Italian opera performed in Paris in 1645

Cardinal Mazarin, raised in Rome, was an enthusiastic supporter of Italian culture and imported Italian painters, architects and musicians to work in Paris. In 1644, he invited the castrato Atto Melani to Paris, along with his brother Jacopo Melani and the Florentine singer Francesca Costa, and introduced the Italian singing style to the French capital. The Italian style was much different than the French style of the day; voices were stronger and the singing expressed stronger emotions, rather than the finesse of the classical French style. The first Italian opera to be performed in Paris was a comédie italienne (which may have been Marco Marazzoli's Il Giudizio della Ragione tra la Beltà e l'Affetto (1643), although this has been disputed) at the Palais-Royal on February 28, 1645, followed by Francesco Sacrati's La finta pazza in December of that year and in 1647 by the more famous Orfeo of Luigi Rossi at the Petit-Bourbon next to the Louvre.

The debut of Italian opera in Paris had exactly the opposite effect that Mazarin desired. As Parisian audiences were not prepared for a theatrical work that was entirely sung, the Cardinal was denounced and ridiculed by Parisian streets singers and pamphlets called mazarinades for spending a fortune on opera decoration and bringing Italian castrati and singers to Paris. Furthermore, during the disorders of the Fronde, Mazarin was forced to leave Paris. When calm was restored, he returned to the capital and carried forward his project to build an opera house. At the time the city had no theater to rival the opera houses of Venice or Rome and, in 1659, Mazarin began construction of the Salle des Machines, a new theater in the north wing of the Tuileries Palace, between the Marsan Pavilion and the chapel. It could seat six thousand persons, had marble columns, was lavishly decorated, and contained the elaborate machinery needed to produce dramatic stage effects. The death of Mazarin delayed the opening, but it was finally inaugurated in 1662 with an Italian opera, Ercole amante, by Cavalli. The premiere was a disaster: the acoustics in the new hall were terrible, and the sound of the stage machinery drowned out the music.

=== The debut of French opera ===
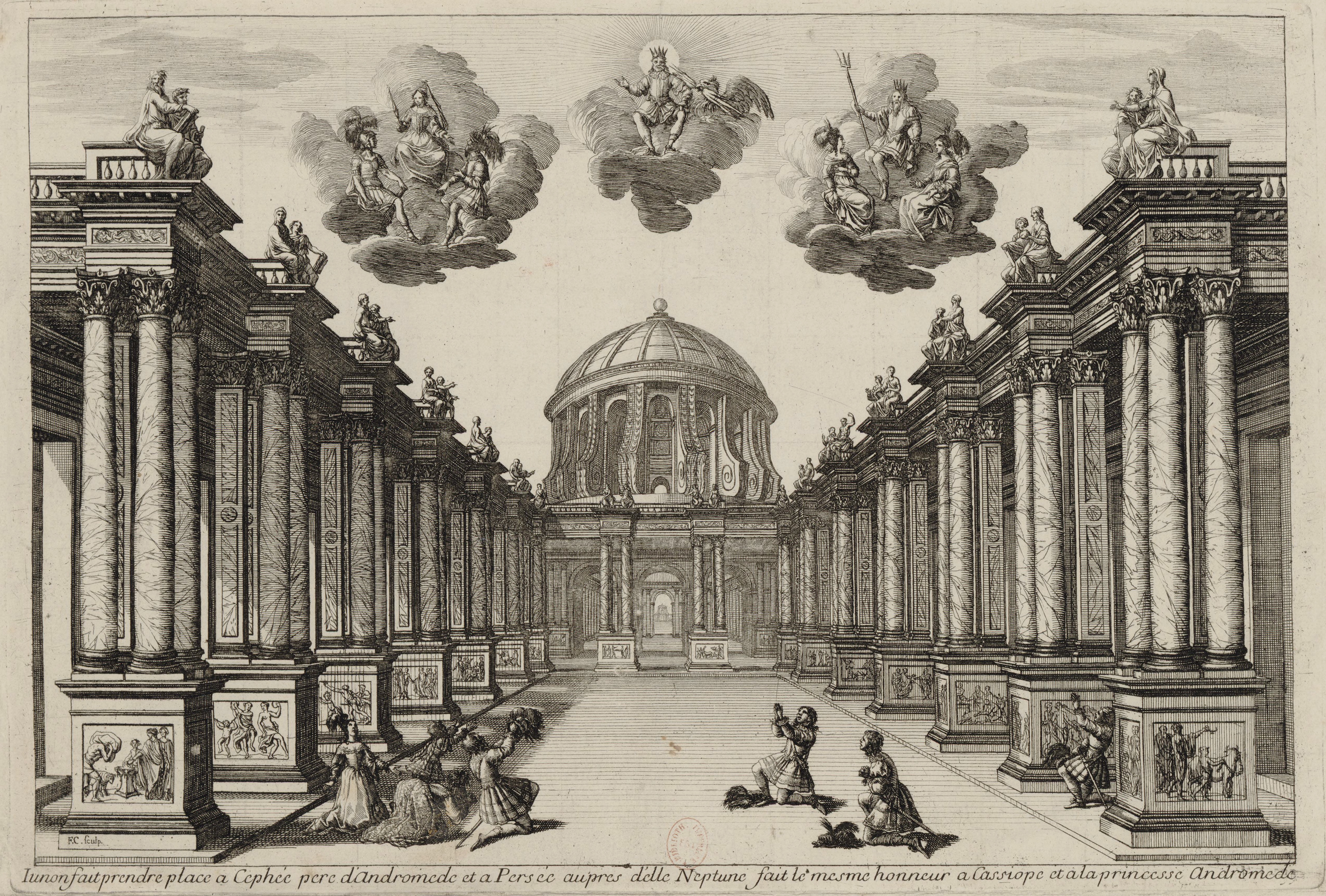
A set by Torelli for the opera Orfeo by Luigi Rossi, reused for the play Andromède by Pierre Corneille at the Palais-Royal (1650)

The efforts to create a French opera continued. The poet Pierre Perrin persuaded the new Controller General of Finances, Colbert, to establish an Academy of Opera, and in 1669 Perrin was given a commission by the king to create works "in music and in French verse comparable to that of Italy." The first opera by Perrin, Pomone, with music by Robert Cambert, was performed on March 3, 1671, inside a converted jeu de paume, or tennis court, the Jeu de Paume de la Bouteille, between the rue des Fossés de Nesles (now rue Mazarine) and the rue de Seine. It was an enormous success, running for one hundred forty-six performances.

Seeing the success of Perrin's work, the official court composer, Lully, moved quickly; he persuaded the royal government to issue a decree banning any theatrical performances with more than two songs or two instruments without Lully's written permission. On November 15, 1672, he opened his own opera house in the Salle du Bel-Air. He also demanded and received from the king the exclusive rights to use the theater of the Palais-Royal, until then used by the theater company of Molière, giving him control over any and all musical performances in Paris. He presented a new opera each year, entirely funded by the royal treasury. In April 1673, he premiered Cadmus et Hermione, the first French opera in the lyric-tragedy form. This form, which dominated French opera for the next two centuries, but was rarely exported, featured stories based on mythology and ancient heroes. The performances made maximum use of machinery, allowing the creation on stage of storms, monsters, and characters descending or ascending into the heavens. The texts involved recitation of verse in a classical half-spoken, half-sung style, borrowed from Racine and Corneille, with a vocal range of an octave, words mingled with sighs, exclamations and vibrato. The works included not only singing, but also dance. The operas were all dedicated to the glory of the Sun King: in the dedication of Armide, Lully wrote: "All of the praises of Paris are not enough for me; it is only to you, Sire, that I want to consecrate all the productions of my genius."

After 1672, Louis XIV no longer lived in Paris, preferring the royal residences of Saint-Germain-en-Laye, Chambord, Fontainebleau, and finally Versailles where he and the court moved permanently in 1682. The royal musicians and opera singers went with him, and Versailles, not Paris, became the center of French musical life.

=== Ballet ===
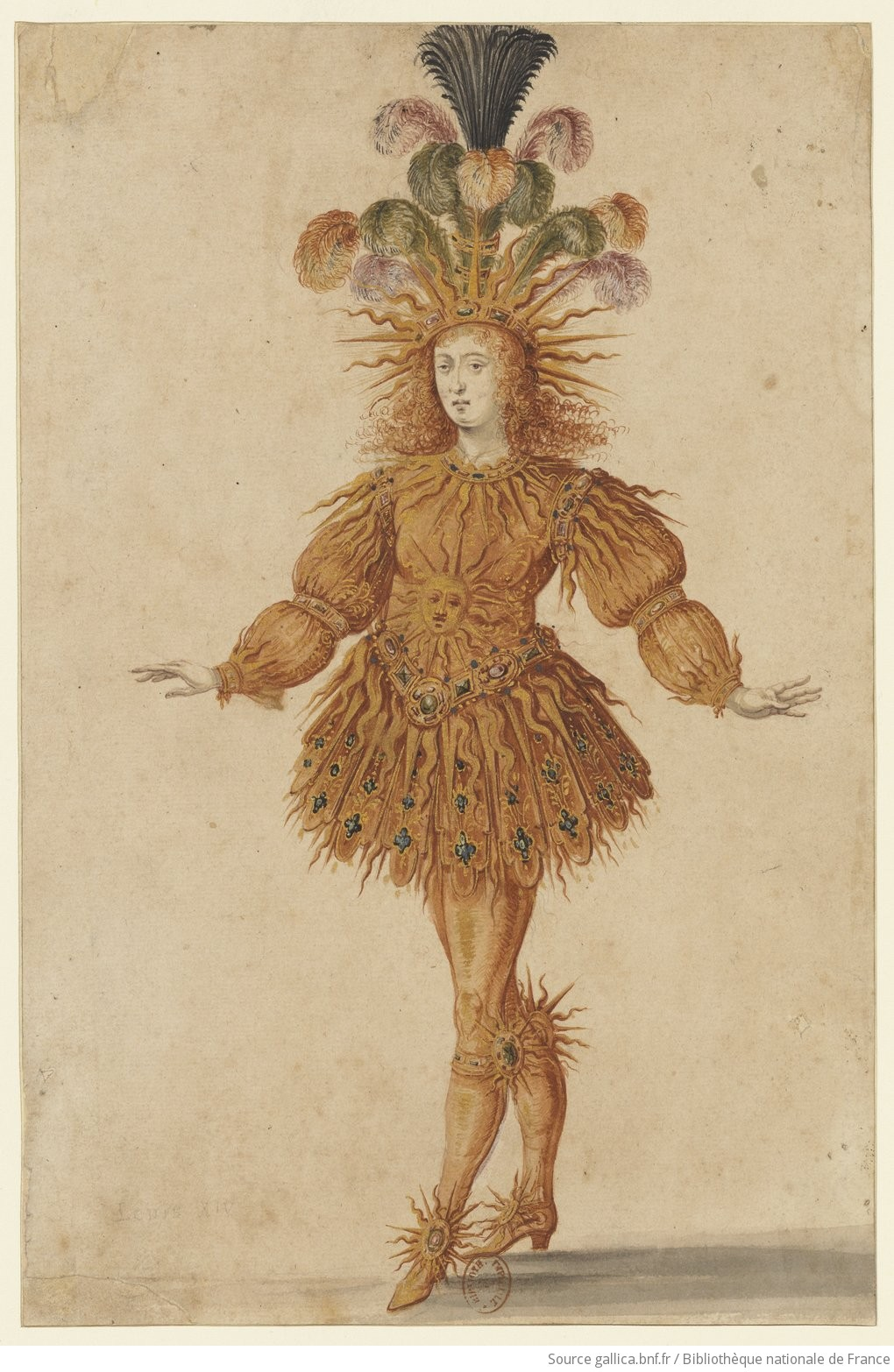
Louis XIV in costume for the Ballet Royal de la Nuit (1653)

During his residence in Paris, the young Louis XIV was an avid dancer and participant in ballet. Ballet was commonly practiced by young nobles, along with fencing and horsemanship. Only men danced, except in ballets given by the ladies of the Queen. Louis practiced several hours a day, and made his first ballet appearance in the Ballet de Cassandre at the age of thirteen. He was featured in the Ballet Royal de la Nuit, at the Petit-Bourbon theater, on 23 February 1653. This court ballet lasted 12 hours, from sundown until sunrise, and consisted of 45 dances. Louis XIV appeared in five of them, the most famous of which saw the young monarch in the role of Apollo, the Sun King, appearing as the Soleil levant ("rising Sun").

With the arrival of the twenty-six-year-old Jean-Baptiste Lully at the court, the ballet began to take on a new dimension. Lully premiered his first Grand Ballet Royal, Alcidiane, on February 14, 1658, with the entire court in attendance. The performance, composed of seventy-nine different tableaux, or scenes, lasted several hours. In the 1660s, Lully evolved the performances into a combination of ballet, singing, and theater. The performance of Molière's comedy-ballet Le Mariage forcé ("The Forced Marriage"), at the Louvre on 29 January 1664, included not only scenes by Molière and his actors, but several ballets, and also songs by the leading singers of the day, Mademoiselle Hilaire and Signora Anna. However, in 1670, at the age of twenty-six, Louis XIV decided to give up dancing. As a result, Lully revised the format of the court ballets to please the King as a spectator, rather than dancer. For his new tragédie-ballet, Psyché, performed before the King on January 17, 1671, the performance included dancing, singing, acting, orchestral music, and immense visual spectacles created by stage machinery. At one point in the performance, three hundred performers were on or suspended above the stage, singing, dancing, or playing lutes, flutes, trumpets, cymbals, violins, the harpsichord, the hautbois and the théorbe.

=== Religious music ===
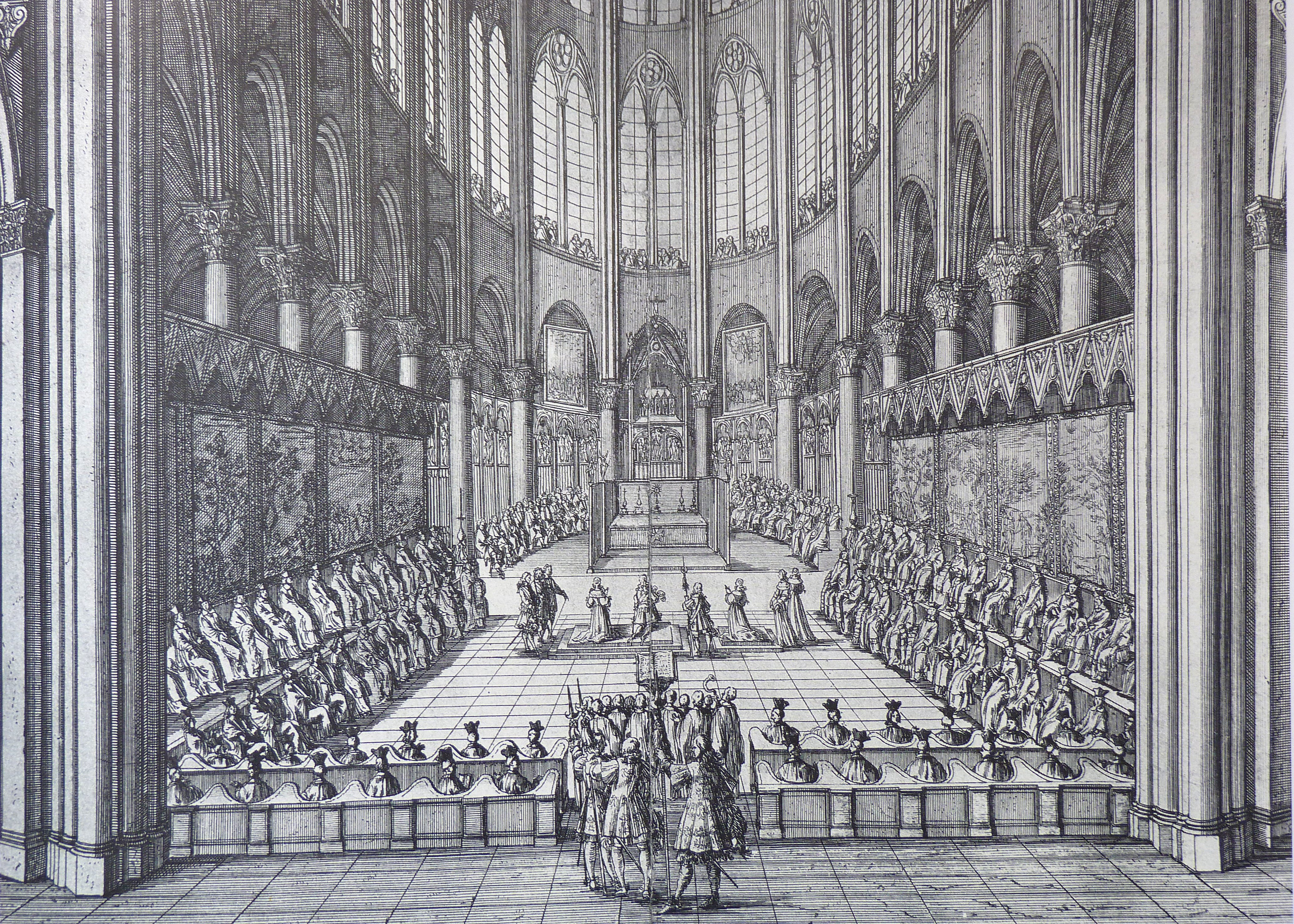
A Te Deum sung in the choir of the cathedral of Notre Dame de Paris, (engraving by Jean Marot 1653)

In the Baroque era, music was an important weapon to win ordinary people to the side of the Catholic Church, as it had been since the Counter-Reformation, a time when music was given a larger role in religious services. The Sainte-Chapelle was renowned for the purity and beauty of its music, while the Te Deum sung at Notre-Dame was reputed for its soloists, choirs, and double-choirs, and for the musical form called the motet created for the cathedral's singers. The churches were equipped with magnificent organs. Most organists of the churches of Paris were members of families who held the post for generations: the most illustrious were members of the Couperin family, who were organists at the church of St-Gervais-et-St-Protais, near the Louvre, for over two centuries, from 1650 until the French Revolution. The most outstanding member of the family was François Couperin, who composed and published numerous pieces, both religious and secular, for the organ and harpsichord. The dynasties included several women who made their mark on Parisian music: François' daughter, Louise Couperin, was a celebrated singer, and his granddaughter Marguerite became the first woman harpsichordist attached to the royal orchestra. Elisabeth Blanchet, the daughter of a prominent Paris harpsichord maker and wife of Armand-Louis Couperin, often took the place of her husband at the organs of Saint-Gervais, Sainte-Chapelle and Notre Dame. Her daughter, Céleste, also became a noted Paris organist at Saint-Gervais.

=== Street musicians and comic opera ===
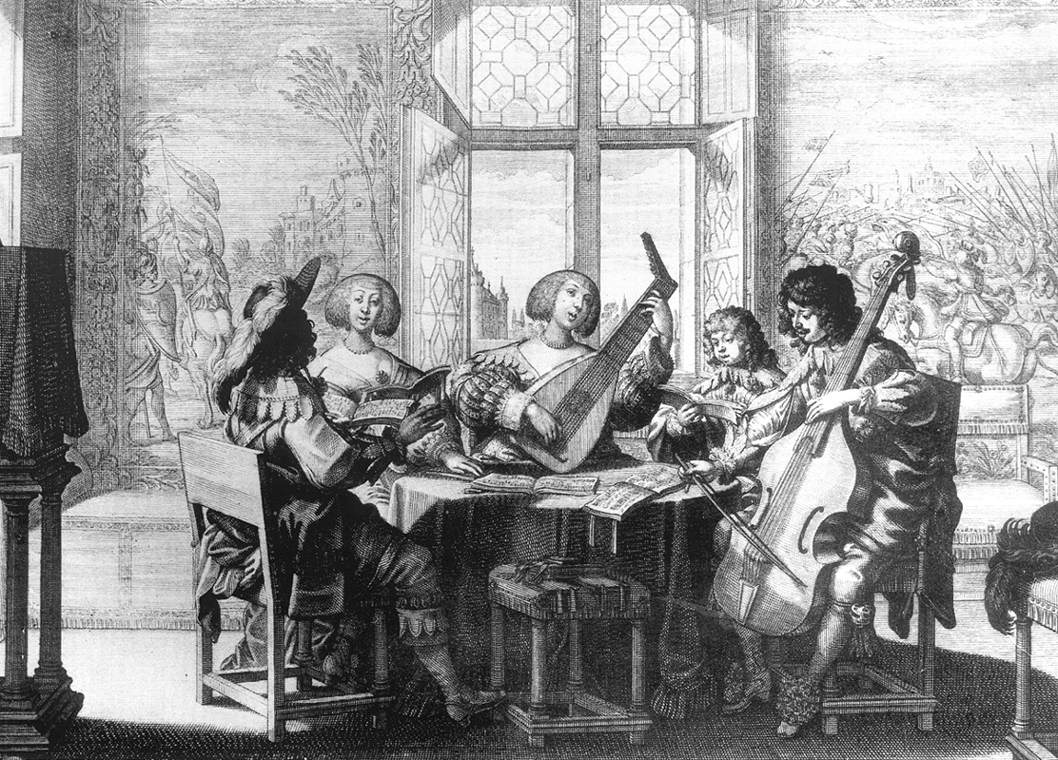
Musicians at home, by Abraham Bosse (about 1632)

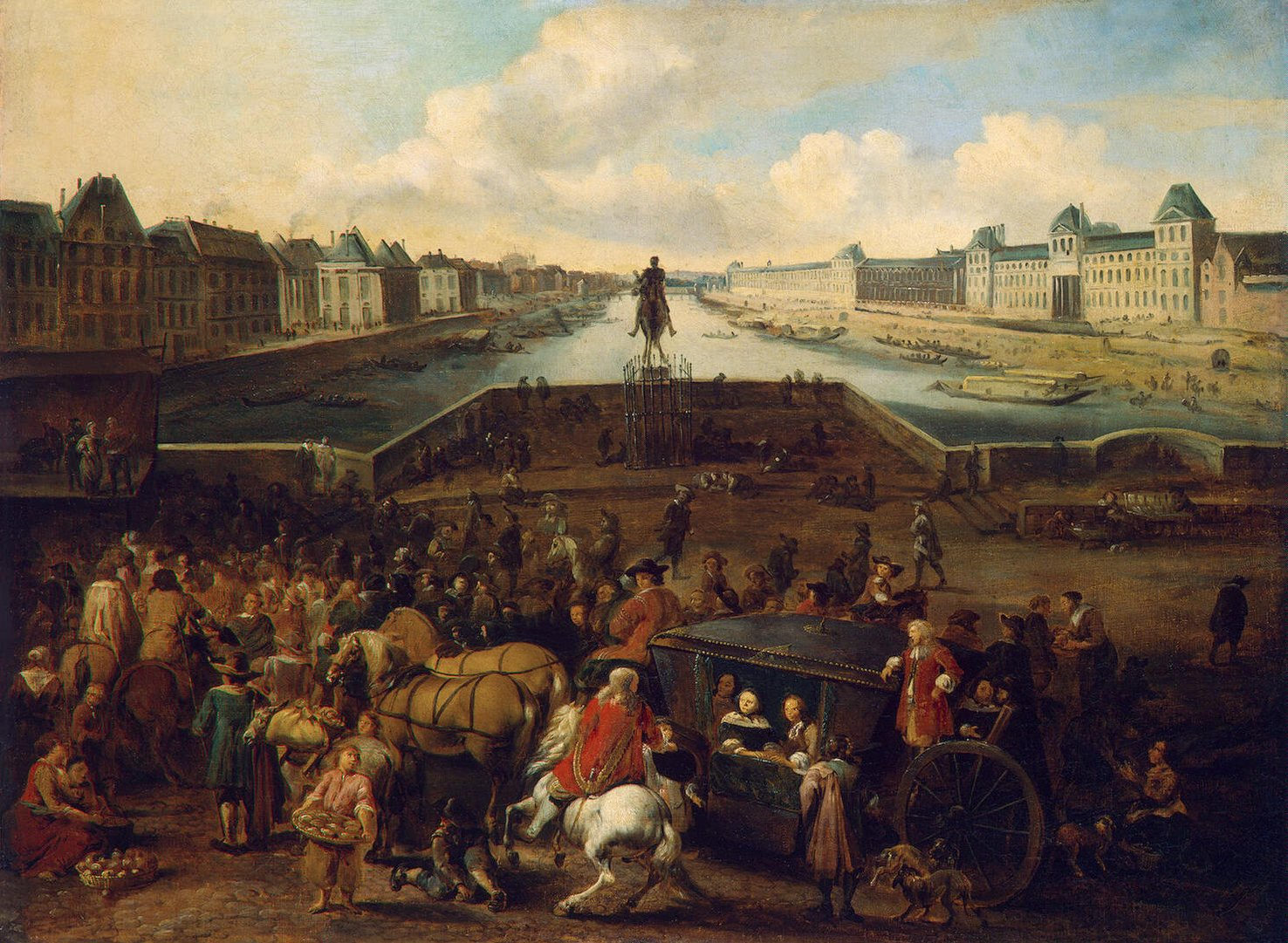
The Pont Neuf was the most popular venue for street singers and musicians (painting by Hendrick Mommers, 1694)

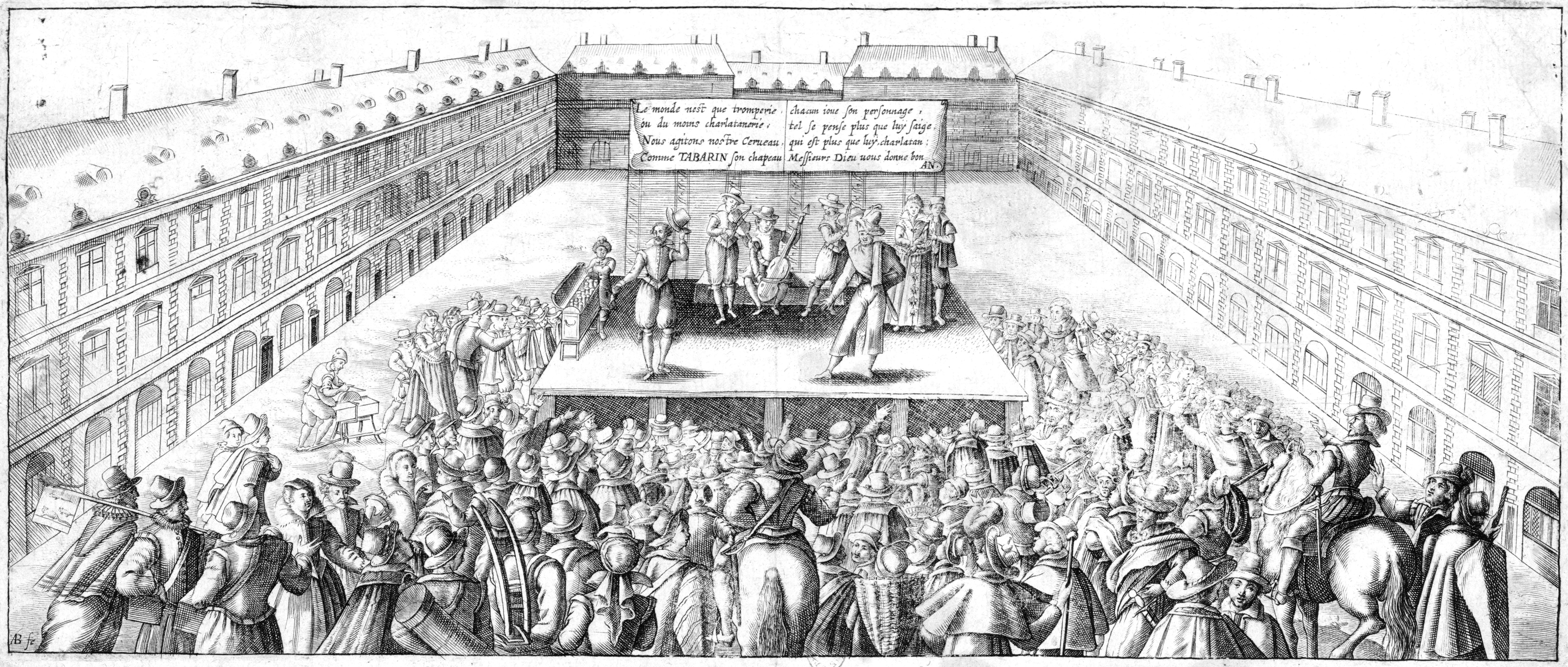
Tabarin's actors and musicians perform on Place Dauphine (17th century)

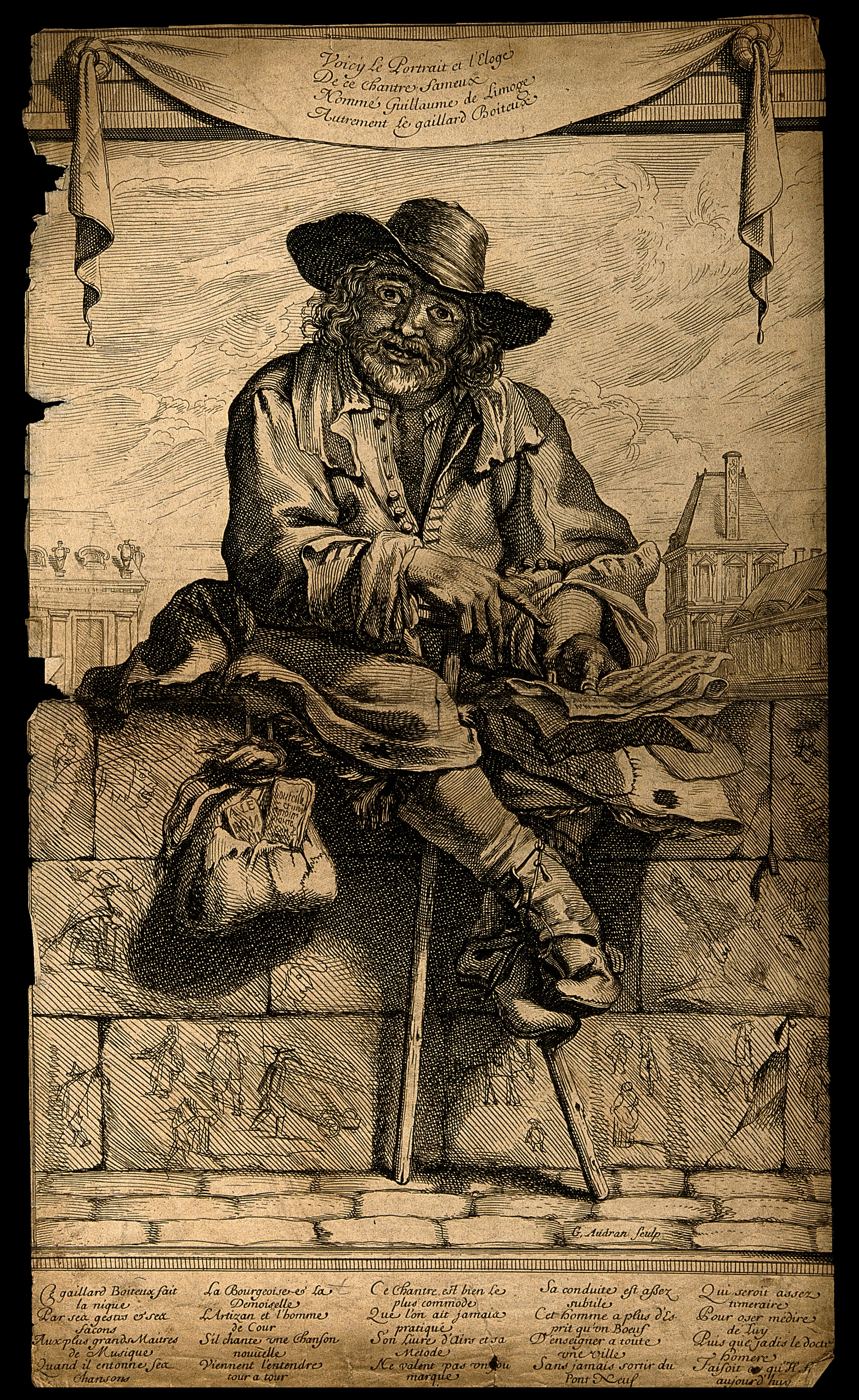
Guillaume de Limoges, the ribald street singer called the "Lame Lothario" on the Pont Neuf (17th century)

The most popular gathering place for street musicians and singers, as well as clowns, acrobats, and poets, was the Pont Neuf, inaugurated by Louis XIII in 1613. All the carriages of the aristocracy and the wealthy crossed the bridge, and since it was the only bridge not lined by houses, there was room for a large audience. Listeners could hear comical songs about current events, romantic poems set to music, and (after 1673), the latest melodies of the court composer, Lully. Philipotte, the "Orpheus of the Pont-Neuf", Duchemin, "The Choir boy of the Pont-Neuf", and the one-legged Guillaume de Limoges, the "Lame Lothario", known for his ribald songs, were famous throughout Paris. The celebrated bateleur Tabarin set up a small stage on Place Dauphine, at the point where the bridge crosses the Île-de-la-CIté; his company presented theater, songs and comedy. Between acts, his business partner sold medicines and ointments.

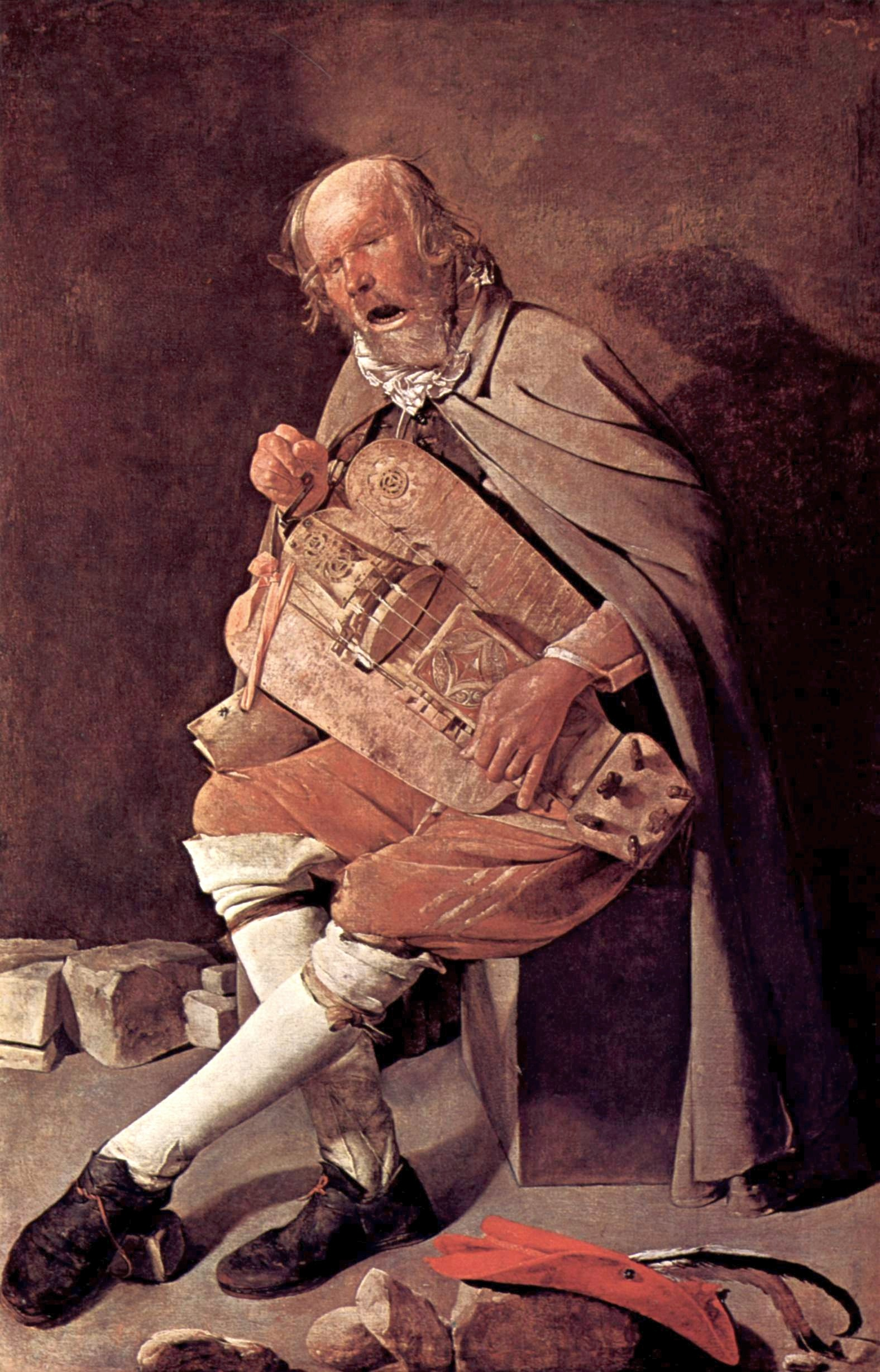
Paris street musician by Georges de La Tour (1630–36)

The debuts of each of the lyric-tragic operas of Lully were followed almost immediately by parodies performed on the stages at the large outdoor fairs of Paris, at Saint-Germain and Saint-Laurent. A large stage was constructed at the Saint-Germain fair in 1678. The Academy of Music moved quickly to have the city ban recitation of text on stage, which was the exclusive right of the Comédie-Française and the Royal Academy of Music. The actors at the fairs responded by writing their dialogue on signs and holding them up, where the audience read them aloud. The singers sometimes also sang with unintelligible words, mimicking the formal court style of Lully's music. The performers at the fairs invented a new style which combined comic songs with satire, and acrobatics, a form which took the name vaudeville.

The foundation of the Royal Academy of Music in 1672 created a growing gulf between the official musicians of the court and the popular musicians of Paris, who were members of the guild of ménétriers (minstrels), with its own rules and traditions, under their traditional head, the elected "King of the Minstrels". While the guild of minstrels had a monopoly over the music in the streets, Lully, the head of the royal academy, had an ordinance passed which gave academy members the exclusive right to play at balls, serenades, and other public events. Academy members did not have to go through the apprenticeship required to be a member of the minstrels guild. The guild of minstrels brought a lawsuit against François Couperin and all organists of the Paris churches, demanding that they join the minstrels guild. The guild won the lawsuit, but the organists appealed to the Parliament of Paris, which exempted them from the rules of the guild. The guild continued to exist until the Revolution: in 1791, it was quietly dissolved.

== 18th century—the opera, the comic opera, and the salons ==
The musical life of Paris at the beginning of the 18th century was gloomy; the court was at Versailles, and frivolity was officially frowned upon by Louis XIV and his second wife, the Marquise de Maintenon, and the religious party at court. The King's favorite composer, Lully, fell into disgrace because of his unorthodox lifestyle. Musical satires and farces continued to be sung on stages at the fairs, but they were constantly under attack from the Royal Academy of Music, which claimed a monopoly on singing performances. The Théâtre-Italien troupe was forced to leave Paris because of accusations that they made fun of Madame de Maintenon. After the death of the Louis XIV in 1715, the Regent and royal court returned to Paris, and the musical world brightened.

=== The Opera ===
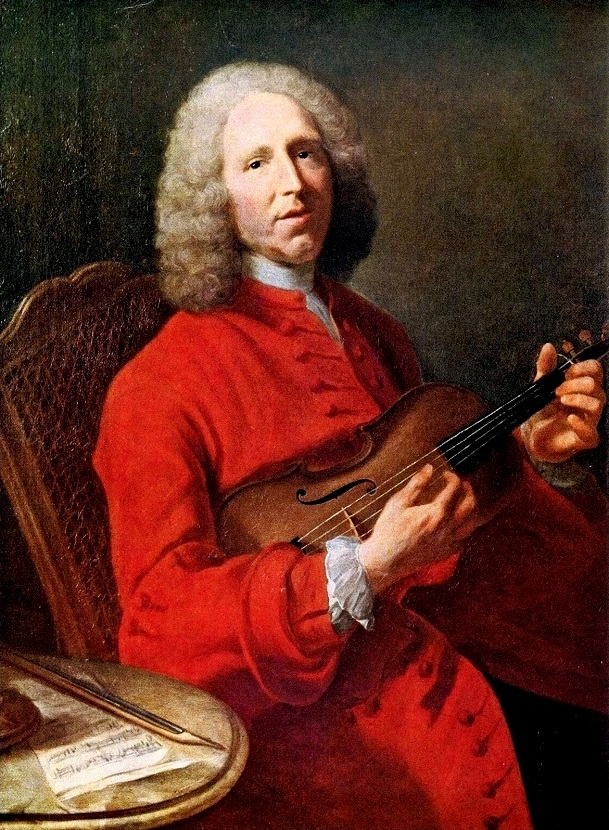
Jean-Philippe Rameau (1728)

The opera continued to create lavish productions of lyrical tragedies, in the style of Lully. In 1749, the management of the opera was transferred from the court to Paris, much to the dismay of city authorities, who had to pay for the huge spectacles. The opera performed at the theater of the Palais-Royal until April 6, 1763, when a fire destroyed that venue. It moved to the Hall of Machines of the Tuileries, then back to the Palais-Royal in 1770 when the theater was rebuilt. It burned down again in 1781. After Lully, the lyric-tragedy style of opera was faithfully maintained by a series of composers, the most prominent of whom was Jean-Philippe Rameau, who arrived in Paris from Dijon in 1723 and premiered his first opera, Hippolyte et Aricie, in 1733. The Mercure de France, the first Paris newspaper, described his music as "manly, harmonious, and of a new character" different from the music of Lully. The musical world of Paris soon divided into Lullyistes and Ramistes (or Rameauneurs, as they were termed by Voltaire). The prolific Rameau produced not only lyrical tragedies, but also opera-ballets, pastorales, and comic ballets.

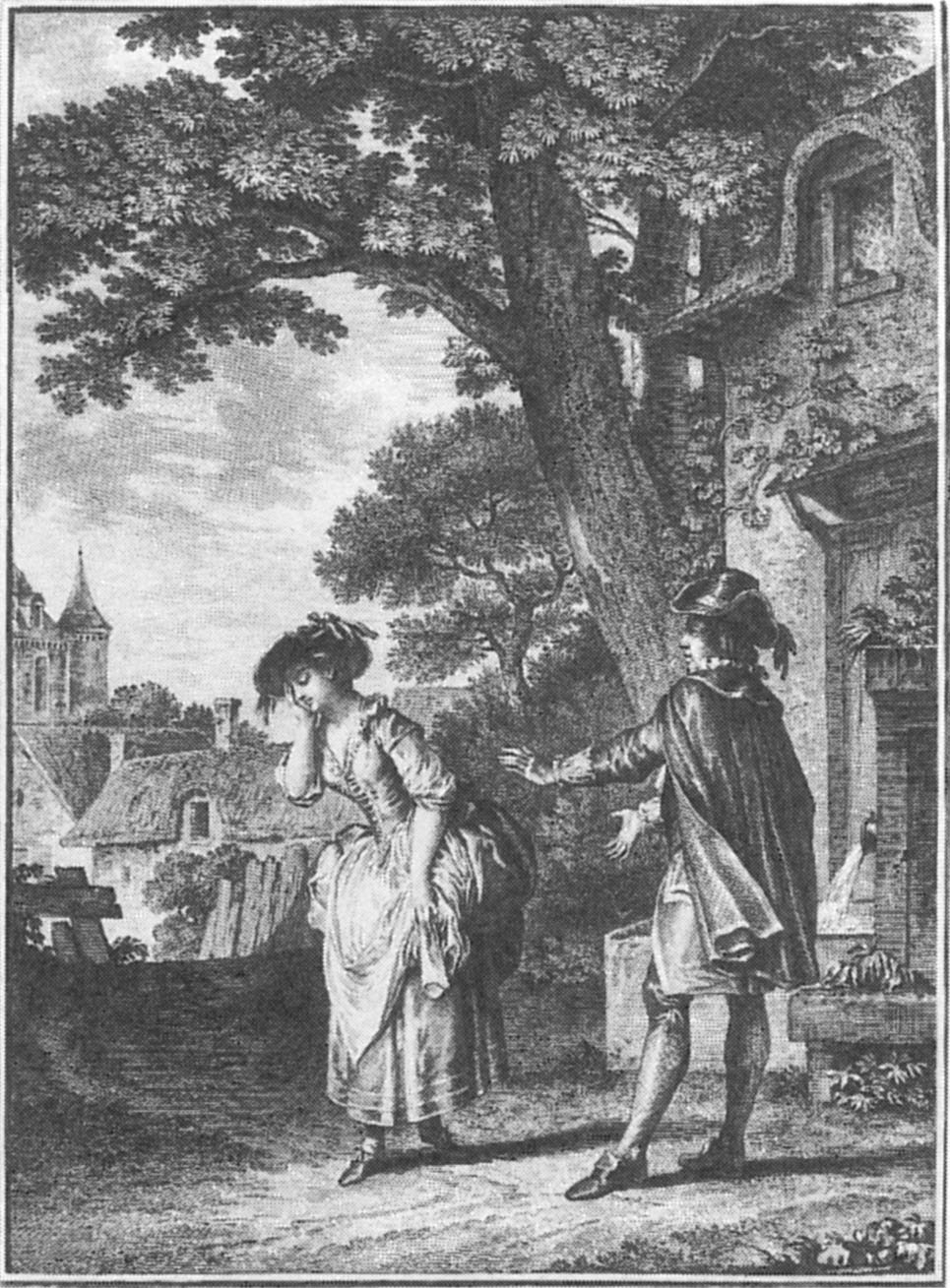
Scene from Le devin du village, the romantic one-act opera by Jean-Jacques Rousseau

By the 1750s, Paris audiences were beginning to tire of the formality, conventions, repetitive themes, mechanical tricks and great length of the lyrical tragedies. In the Enlightenment begun in France in 1715, critics demanded a new, more natural form of opera. The battle was launched by the first performance in 1752 of La Serva Padrona, a 1733 Italian opera by Giovanni Battista Pergolesi at the Academy by the company of Bouffons. The philosopher Jean-Jacques Rousseau praised the Italian opera for its simple plot, popular characters, and melodic singing. Describing the quarrel in his Confessions, Rousseau wrote: "On the one side, the most powerful and influential, were the rich, the nobles, and women, supporting the French style; on the other side, more lively, more proud, and more enthusiastic, were the true connaisseurs, the people of talent, the men of genius". Rameau defended his music: "Do you not know that music is a physical-mathematical science, and that sound is a physical object, and that the relationships between the different sounds are made by mathematics and geometry?" Roussau responded that music was the language of feelings; "from the melody comes all the power of music over the human spirit." To illustrate his point, Rousseau wrote a text for a new one-act opera (intermède), Le devin du village ("The village soothsayer"), about the love of two simple peasants, which became part of the Academy repertoire for the next sixty years. Over the course of the 18th century, the heroic style of Lully and Rameau quietly disappeared from Paris stages, replaced by the more natural and more romantic Italian style.

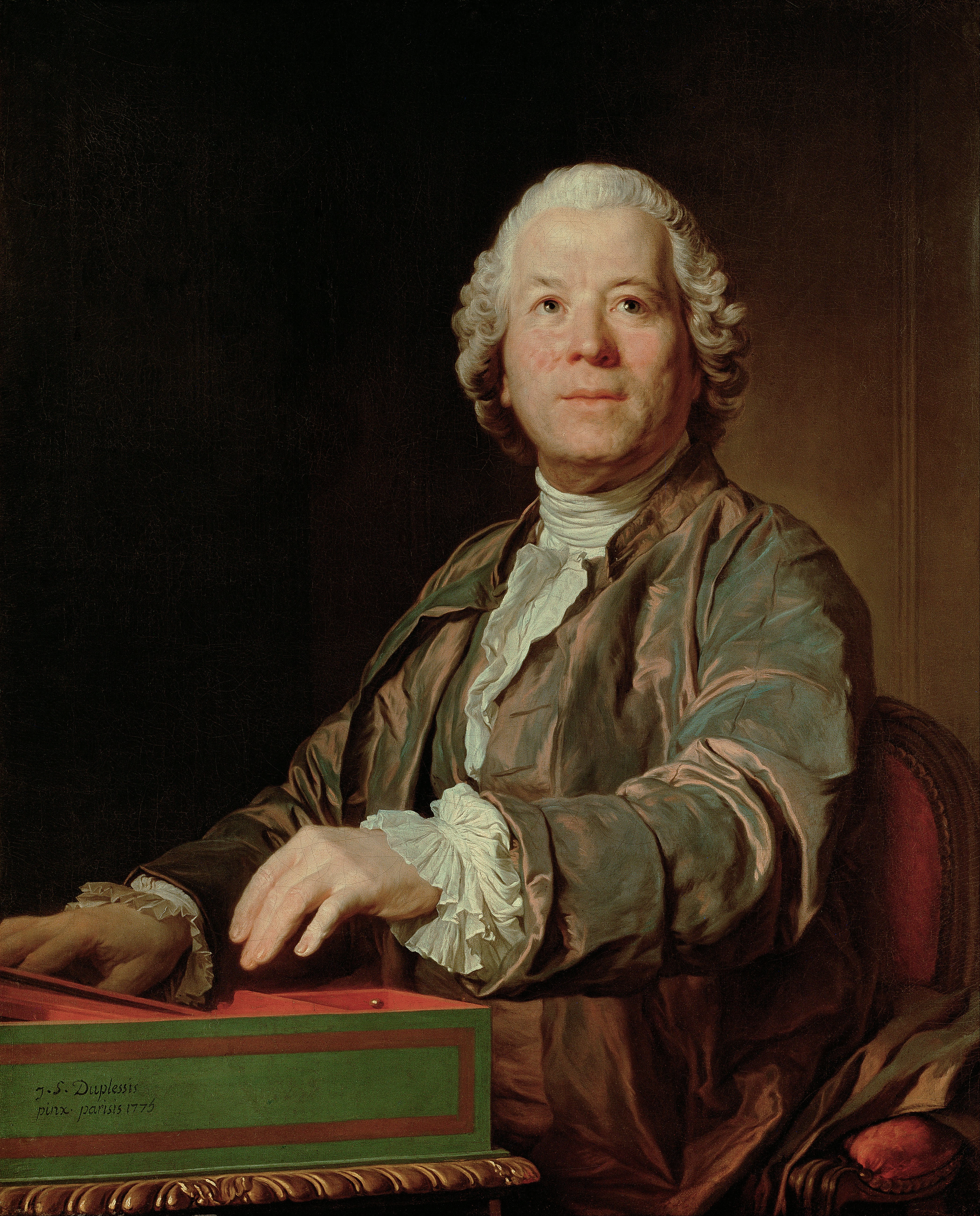
Christoph Willibald Gluck

Another operatic feud began with the arrival of the German composer Christoph Willibald Gluck in Paris in 1776. He had already written a series of successful Italian operas. In Vienna, he had studied French and had been the music teacher of the young Marie Antoinette. In 1774, he staged the opera Iphigénie en Aulide in Paris, which became a huge popular triumph; he followed it with a French version of Orfeo ed Euridice, which he had written in Vienna in 1762, and then Alceste, reviving the classical lyrical tragedy style. The supporters of Italian opera responded by bringing the Italian opera composer Niccolo Piccinni to Paris in 1776. The rival new operas written by Gluck and Piccinni did not please the fickle Parisian audiences, and both composers left Paris in disgust. By the time of the Revolution the repertoire of the Paris opera consisted of five operas by Gluck, and those of Piccinni, Antonio Salieri, Sacchini and Gretry. Rameau and the French classical style had almost disappeared from the repertoire.

=== The fairs and the Opéra-Comique ===
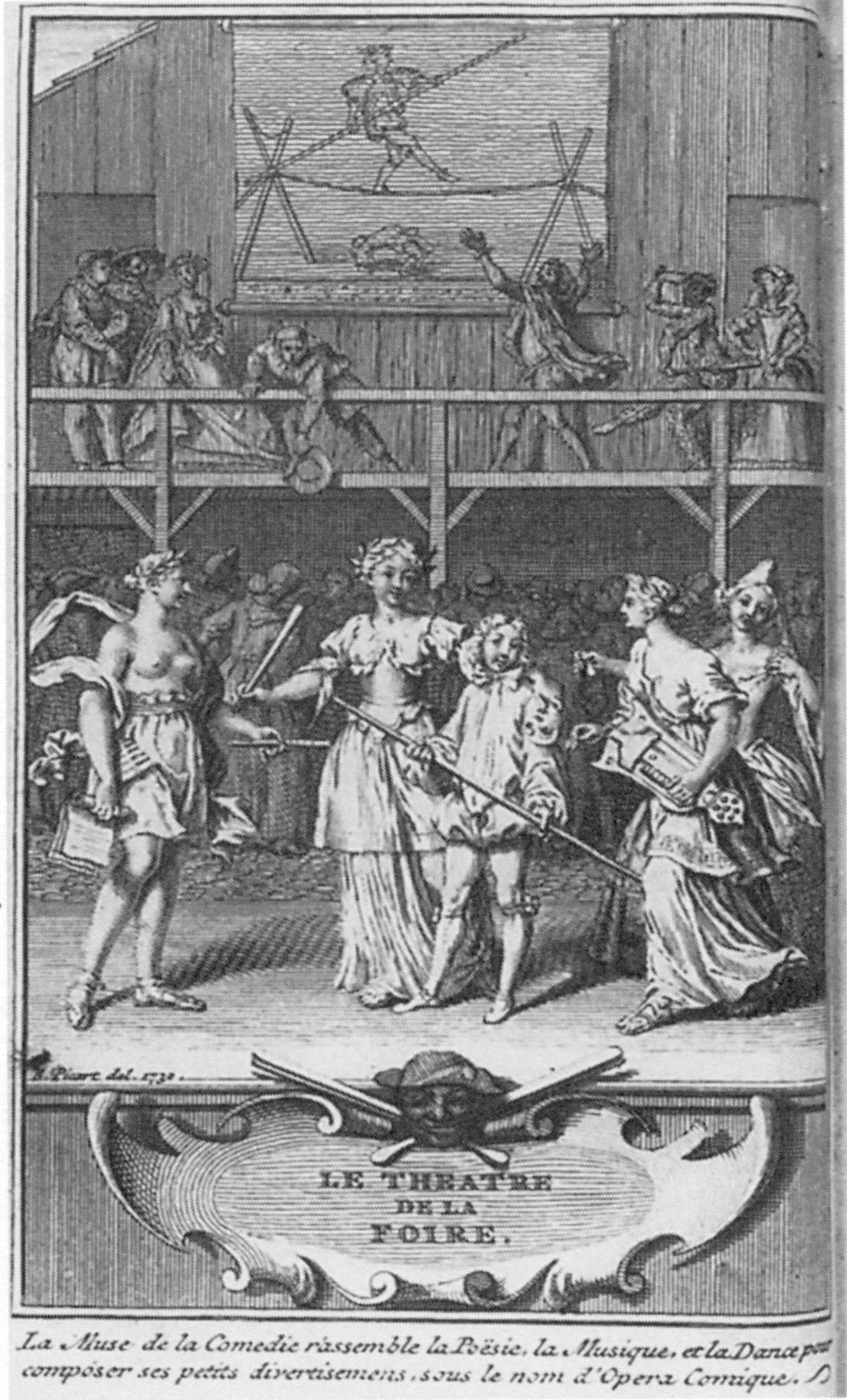
"The Muse of Comedy brings together poetry, music and dance at the Opéra-Comique" (engraving from 1730)

Throughout the 18th century, the stages of the largest fairs, the Foire Saint-Germain and Foire Saint-Laurent, were the places to see popular entertainment, pantomime and satirical songs. They were only open for a short period of time each year, and were strictly controlled by the rules of the Royal Academy of Music. In 1714–15, the Academy was short of money, and decided to sell licenses to producers of popular theater. The Comédiens-Italiens, expelled from Paris under Louis XIV, were invited back to Paris to perform satirical songs and sketches on the stage at the Hôtel de Bourgogne. In 1726, a new company, the Opéra-Comique, made up of performers from the Saint-Germain fair, was formed. It first settled near the fair on rue de Buci, then moved to the dead-end street cul de sac des Quatre-Vents. Some of the most famous popular French singers of the period and the playwright Charles-Simon Favart made their debut there. In 1744, the Opéra-Comique was taken over by an ambitious new director, Jean Monnet, who built a new theater at the Saint-Laurent fair, with decorations by the famed artist François Boucher, and an orchestra of eighteen musicians conducted by Jean-Philippe Rameau. In 1762, the two competing comic opera theaters were merged under a royal charter, and were allowed to perform all year long, not just during the fairs. The two groups first performed independently on the stage at the Hôtel de Bourgone, and engaged the best composers of the time, including Pierre-Alexandre Monsigny, François-André Danican Philidor and André Grétry. In 1783, they built a brand-new theater, between rues Favart, Marivaux, and the future boulevard des Italiens. The new theater, called Salle Favart, opened on April 28, 1783, in the center of what soon became the city's main theater district.

=== Salons ===
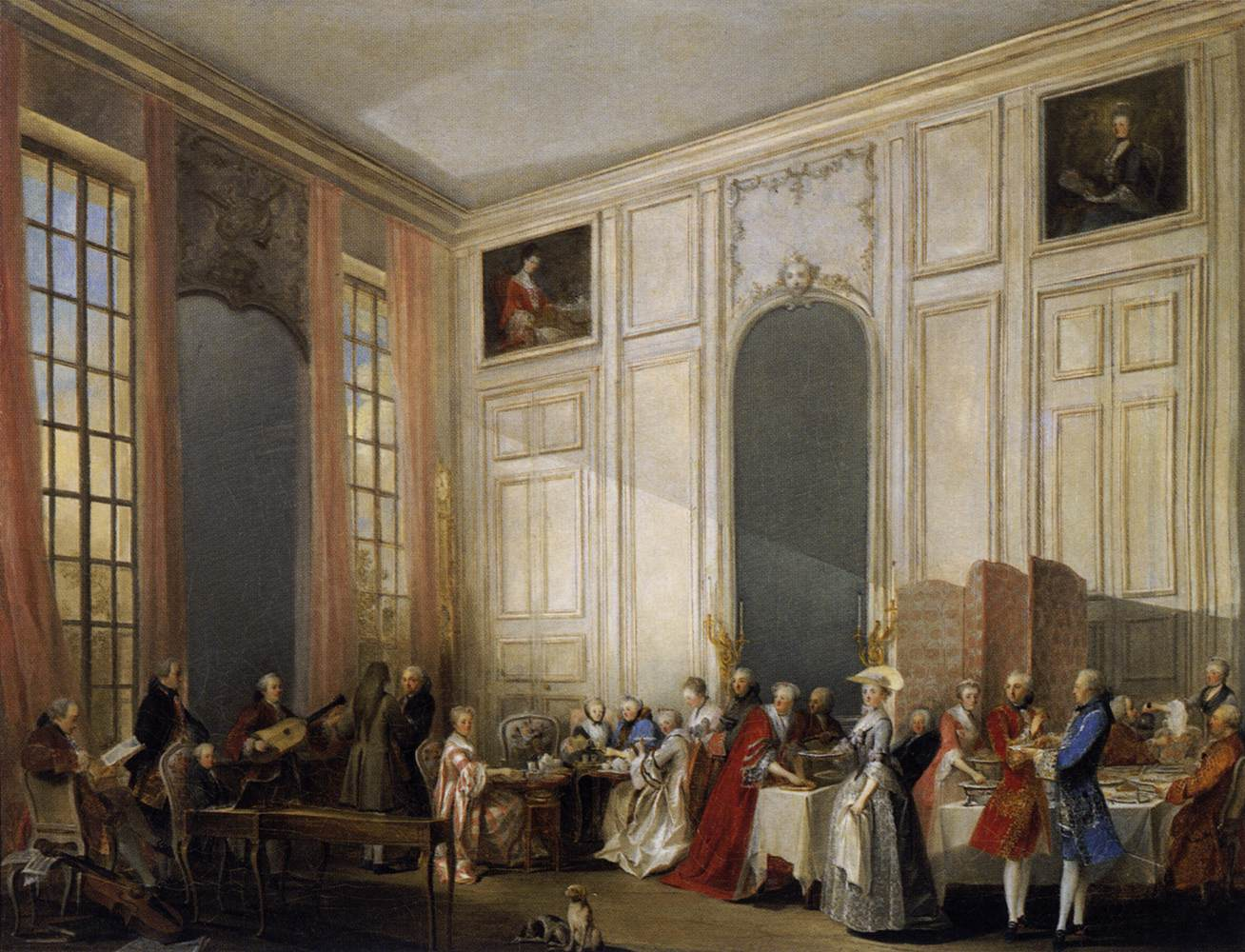
The 8-year old Mozart performs for guests in the salon des Quatre Glaces of the Temple in Paris in 1764. Painting Le thé à l'anglaise by Michel Barthélemy Ollivier, finished in 1766

Much of the musical activity of the city took place in the salons of the nobility and wealthy Parisians. They sponsored private orchestras, often with a combination of both professional and amateur musicians, commissioned works, and organized concerts of very high quality, often with a mixture of both professional and amateur musicians. Some very wealthy Parisians built small theaters within their homes. In 1764, Louis François, Prince of Conti hosted a reception in his palace where the featured attraction was the ten-year-old Wolfgang Amadeus Mozart at the harpsichord. A musical society was organized by the Marquise de Prie, the mistress of the Duke of Bourbon, which gave concerts of Italian music twice a week at the Louvre. The sixty-odd members who attended paid an annual fee, which went to the musicians. Though private individuals were forbidden to hold concerts without the permission of the Royal Academy of Music, a wealthy Parisian named Monsieur Bouland had a theater within his house on rue Saint-Antoine with a stage for two actors, an orchestra of twenty, and seating for three hundred. The owners of salons invited not only classical musicians, but also popular singers of comic opera from the Paris fairs, such as Pierre Laujon and Charles Collé, who became quite wealthy.

The Masonic movement became immensely popular among the Parisian upper classes; the first lodge opened in Paris in 1736, and had four famous musicians among its first members. By 1742, there were more than twenty, each with its own musical director. One of the most famous concert societies was the Concert Spirituel, created in 1725, which organized public concerts of religious music in Latin, and later Italian and French, in a salon within the Tuileries Palace provided by the King. Attendees at the concerts included queen Marie Antoinette. The society commissioned works of music by important composers, including Haydn and Mozart, who wrote and performed the Symphony n° 31, K. 297/300a, known as the "Paris Symphony", for the Society during his visit to Paris in 1778. In 1763, the society moved to the Hall of Machines, and had an orchestra of fifty-four musicians and vocal ensemble of six sopranos, six tenors, and six basses.

=== Popular music and street singers ===
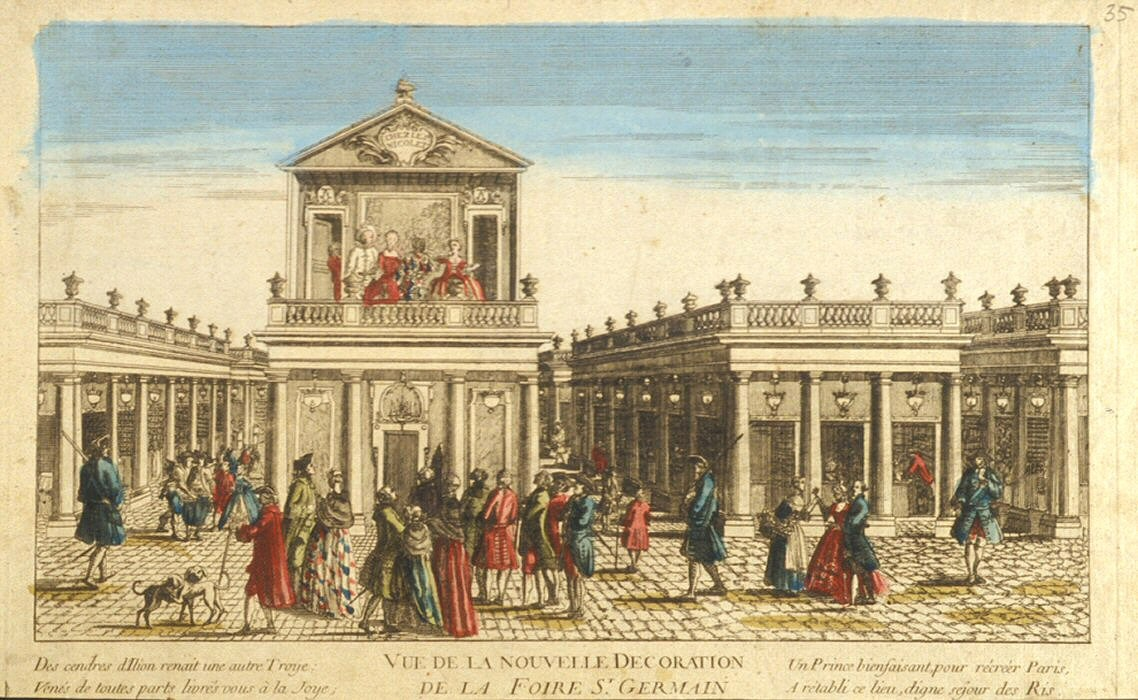
Theater at the Foire Saint-Germain (1763)

The most popular venues for popular music, satire, and comic songs continued to be the stages at the major fairs, where crowds listened to satirical, comical and sentimental songs, though they were only open part of the year. In 1742, the royal government decided that the street singers on the Pont-Neuf were a public nuisance, and were blocking traffic. Only booksellers were allowed to remain, and they had to pay a fee to the royal government. The street and popular musicians migrated across town to the Boulevard du Temple, a wide street with vestiges of the old city walls on one side, and houses on the other. In 1753, the city authorized the construction of cafés and theaters, at first made of canvas and wood, along the boulevard; and the boulevard quickly became the center of popular theater of Paris, a position it held until the Second Empire.

=== Public balls ===
Public balls were banned on moral grounds during the last years of the reign of Louis XIV, and were not permitted again until after his death in September 1715. Shortly after, a royal ordinance of 31 December 1715 authorized the first public balls in the city. These were the famous masked balls of the Paris Opera, which took place on Thursdays, Saturdays and Sundays beginning on St. Martin's Day (November 11) and continuing until Carnival (February–March).

== The music of revolutionary Paris (1789–1800) ==
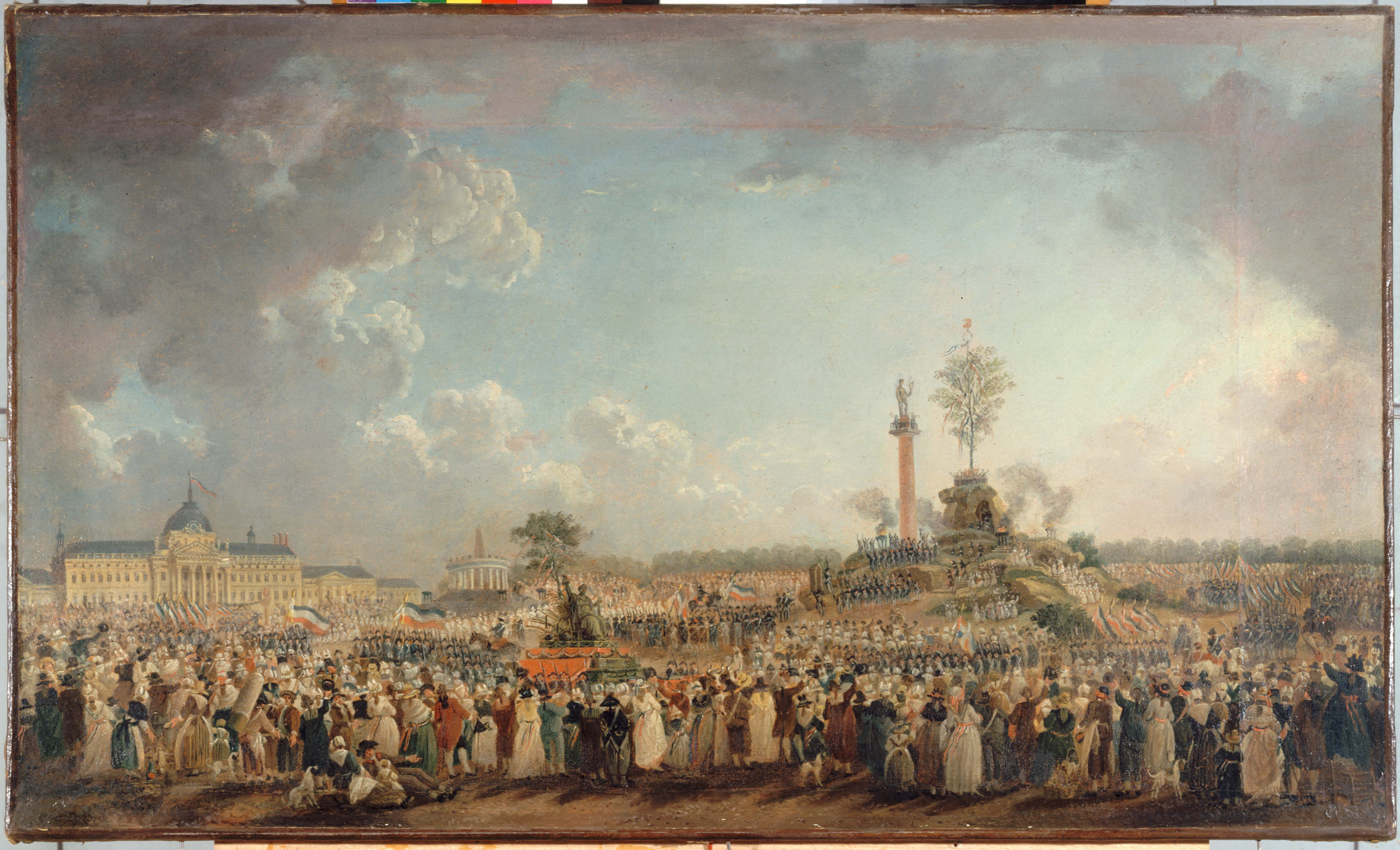
The Festival of the Supreme Being on the Champ de Mars (June 8, 1794)

Patriotic and revolutionary songs gave, as one journal of the period, the Chronique de Paris, wrote, "The national color to the Revolution". They were sung at political meetings, in theaters, in schools and on the streets. The most popular were the Carmagnole (about 1792); with words by an anonymous author, and music from an existing song; and Ça ira with words by Ladré and the music of an old contredanse by the violinist Bécaut called Le Carillon national. The song took its title from an expression, "That will happen," which Benjamin Franklin, the American envoy to Paris, had popularized, describing the American Revolution. The most famous song of the period was the Chant de guerre pour l'armée du Rhin (Battle Song of the Army of the Rhine), by a young army officer, Claude Rouget de Lisle. It was first sung in public on 30 July 1791 by a battalion of volunteers from Marseille as they marched into Paris, and thereafter became known as the Hymne des Marseillais, which became, on 10 August 1792, the official anthem of the Revolution. During the revolutionary period, Ça ira was played by the orchestra in every theater before a performance, with the audience and performers singing. The Marseillaise was always performed at the intermission. Often the songs were sung during the performances, if the audience demanded it. In 1796, the Directory made the singing of such songs obligatory for all theaters, while banning the singing of songs by other political factions, such as the Réveil du people (Wake-up call of the People), the song of the Thermidorians.

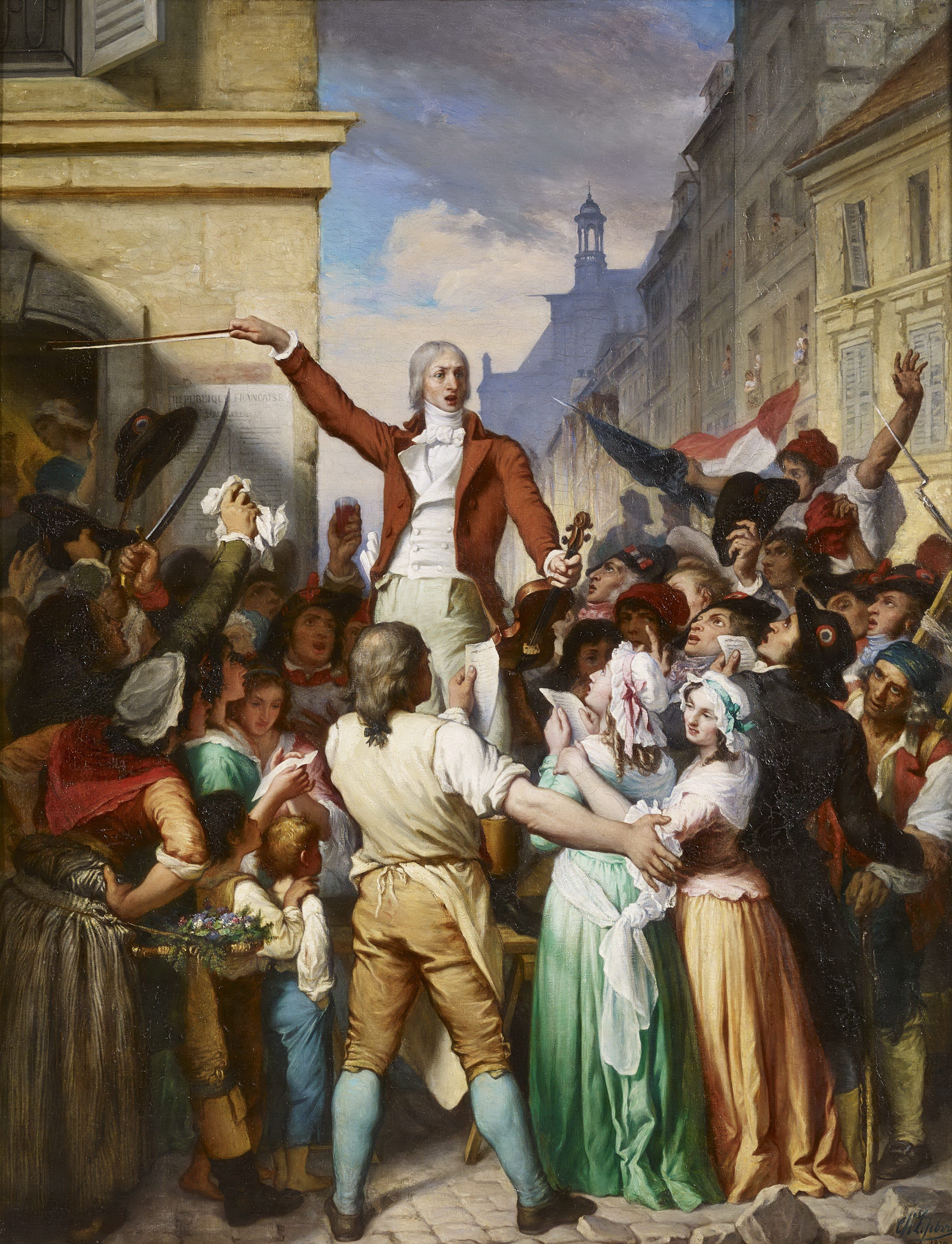
Étienne Méhul teaching patriotic songs to the people of Paris

Music was also an important ingredient of the enormous public festivals that were organized by the Revolutionary governments, usually on the Champ de Mars, which was transformed into an immense outdoor theater to host these spectacles. The first was the Fête de la Fédération on 14 July 1790, a festival marking the first anniversary of the taking of the Bastille. The fêtes began in the morning with the ringing of church bells and firing of cannons; patriotic songs were sung throughout the ceremonies, which always concluded with a concert by the musicians of the National Guard and a ball in the streets. The last of the great festivals was the Festival of the Supreme Being, organized on June 8, 1794, by Robespierre, as a substitute for traditional religious celebrations; it had singers and choirs surrounding an artificial mountain crowned by the Tree of Liberty. Robespierre's role in the event did not entirely please the audience; he was arrested and executed a few weeks later.

=== Founding of the Conservatory ===
The flight of the aristocracy from Paris had created an enormous number of unemployed musicians and music teachers. However, the growing number of public concerts and ceremonies required a great number of trained musicians, particularly for the orchestra and band of the Garde Nationale, which had been formed in June 1790 to perform at the Festival of the Federation on the Champ de Mars. Bernard Sarrette, a captain of the National Guard, founded a school to train eighty young musicians, who at first were taught only wind instruments. The first national music school in France, it was given the name the Institut national de Musique. The teachers were leading musicians and composers of the period. The revolutionary Committee of Public Safety (Comité de salut public) instructed the new music school to concentrate on the composition of "civic songs, music for national festivals, theater pieces, military music, all types of music which will inspire in Republicans the sentiments and memories most dear to the Revolution."

In 1792, the revolutionary government, the National Convention, decided to create a larger and more ambitious school of music, which would teach all instruments and genres of music. It was named the Conservatoire national de musique, using the name "Conservatory", an Italian Renaissance institution much praised by Jean-Jacques Rousseau. It became the first music conservatory in France, with 350 students of both sexes from the 83 departments of France of that time. The 115 music teachers were paid by the State. The institute, in the meanwhile, collected the musical instruments and musical libraries of the thousands of aristocrats who had fled France, and stored them in a central depository for the use of students. The Conservatory opened its doors in 1796.

=== Musical theater and the opera ===
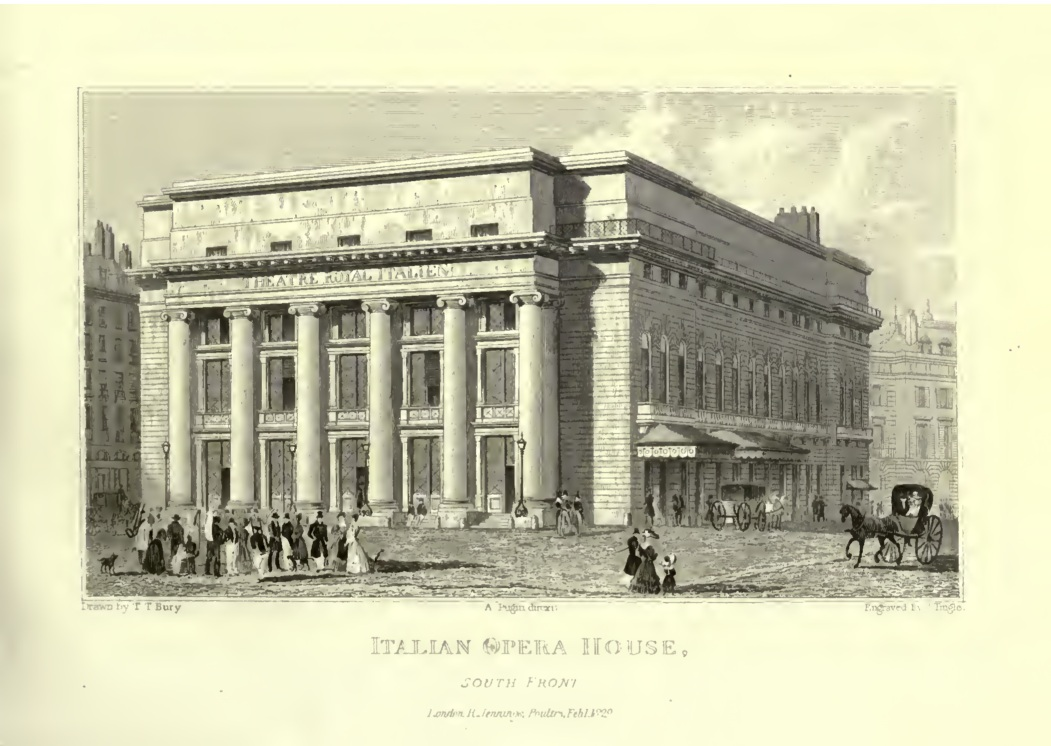
The first Salle Favart, built for the Théátre Royal Italien in 1783

Despite the turmoil of the Revolution (or perhaps partly because of it) musical theater thrived during the period. New theaters appeared: the Théâtre du Vaudeville, the Palais-Variétes and the Théâtre Feydeau. The Feydau theater featured both a troupe performing French comic operas, and another performing Italian comedies. A half-dozen new theaters on the Boulevard du Temple, the new theater district of the city, performed vaudeville, pantomime and comic opera. The actress Mademoiselle Montansier opened her own musical theater in the Palais-Royal. The great fair of Saint-Germain, was closed by the Revolution, but a new theater, the Théâtre Lyrique de Saint-Germain, opened on its old site in 1791. Seventy-six new comic operas or vaudeville programs were staged in 1790, and fifty new works in each of the following years. Censorship of theatrical works was abolished in 1791, but this freedom did not last long. In 1793, the Committee of Public Safety decreed that any theater which put on plays "contrary to the spirit of the Revolution" would be closed and its property seized. After this decree, musical works on patriotic and revolutionary themes multiplied in the Paris theaters.

The opera itself, a symbol of the aristocracy, was officially taken away from the former Royal Academy and given to the city of Paris in 1790. When the Terror began in 1793, one of its two new directors fled abroad, and the second was arrested, and only escaped the guillotine because Robespierre was executed first. Price of tickets was reduced, and special free performances were given for the poor. The program at both the Opera and the Opéra-comique were largely patriotic, republican and sometimes anti-religious. At the same time, operas by Lully and Gluck were still performed, though sometimes new lyrics were added attacking the King and monarchy. In March 1793, in the midst of the terror, Parisians heard their first Mozart opera, The Magic Flute, in French and without the recitatives. The opera was forced to move from its theater at Porte Saint-Martin in 1794 to the Salle Montansier at the Palais-Royal so the government could use the theater for political meetings. The Opera saw its name changed from the Académie royale de musique to the Théátre de l'Opéra (1791), Théátre des Arts (1791), Théátre de la République et des Arts (1797), Théâtre de l'Opéra again in 1802, then, under Napoleon, to the Académie impériale (1804).

=== Pleasure gardens, cafés chantants and guinguettes ===
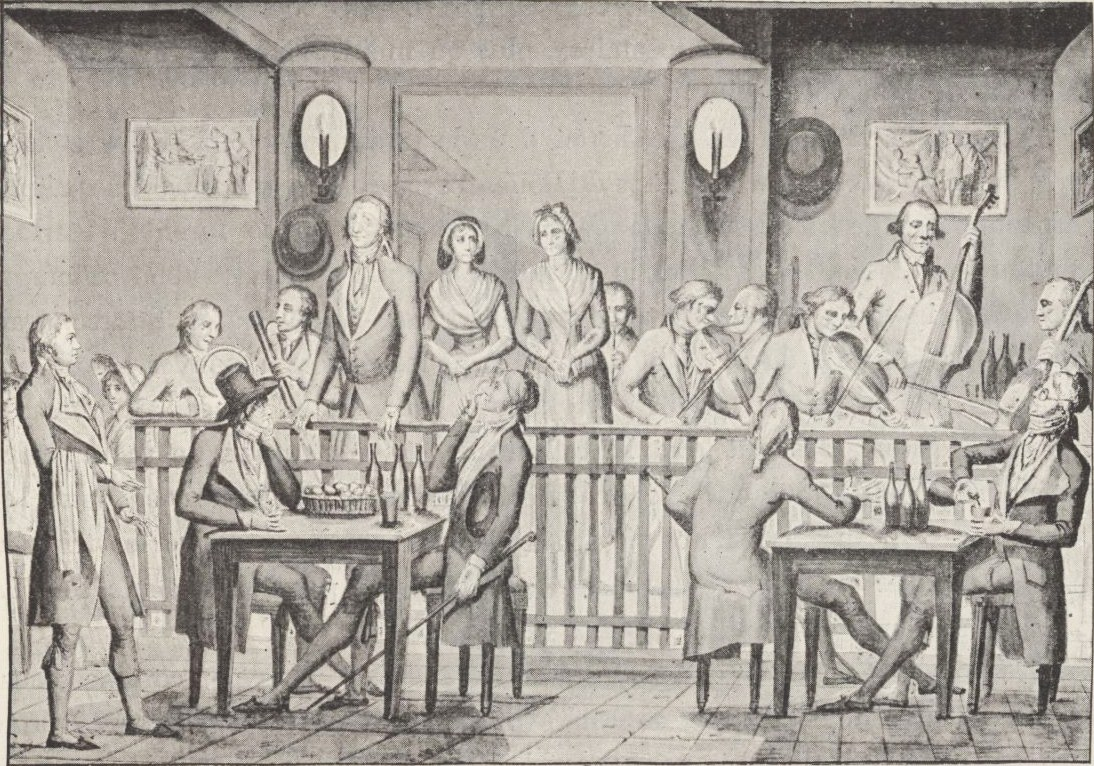
The Café des Aveugles at the Palais-Royal in about 1800

During the late 18th century, and particularly after the end of the Reign of Terror, Parisians of all classes were in constant search for entertainment. The end of the century saw the opening of the pleasure gardens of Ranelegh, Vauxhall, and Tivoli. These were large private gardens where, in summer, Parisians paid an admission charge and found food, music, dancing, and other amusements, from pantomime to magic lantern shows and fireworks. The admission fee was relatively high; the owners of the gardens wanted to attract a more upper-class clientele and keep out the more boisterous Parisians who thronged the boulevards.

With the closure of the fairs by the 1789 Revolution, the most popular destination for musical entertainment became Palais-Royal. Between 1780 and 1784, the duc de Chartres, (who became the Duke of Orleans in 1785 at the death of his father), rebuilt the garden of the Palais-Royal into a pleasure garden surrounded by wide covered arcades, which were occupied by shops, art galleries, and the first true restaurants in Paris. The basements were occupied by popular cafés with drinks, food and musical entertainment, and the upper floors by rooms for card-playing. The first famous musical café was the Café des Aveugles, which had an orchestra and chorus of blind musicians. In its early days it was popular with visitors to Paris, and also attracted prostitutes, trinket-sellers and pickpockets. Later cafés in the Palais Royal, named cafés chantants, offered musical programs of comic, sentimental and patriotic songs.

The guinguette was mentioned as early as 1723 in Savary's posthumously published Dictionnaire du commerce. It was a type of tavern located just outside the city limits, where wine and other drinks were much cheaper and taxed less. They were open Sundays and holidays, usually had musicians for dancing, and attracted large crowds of working-class Parisians eager for rest and recreation after the work week. As time went on, guinguettes also attracted middle class Parisians with their families.

== Music during the First Empire (1800–1814) ==
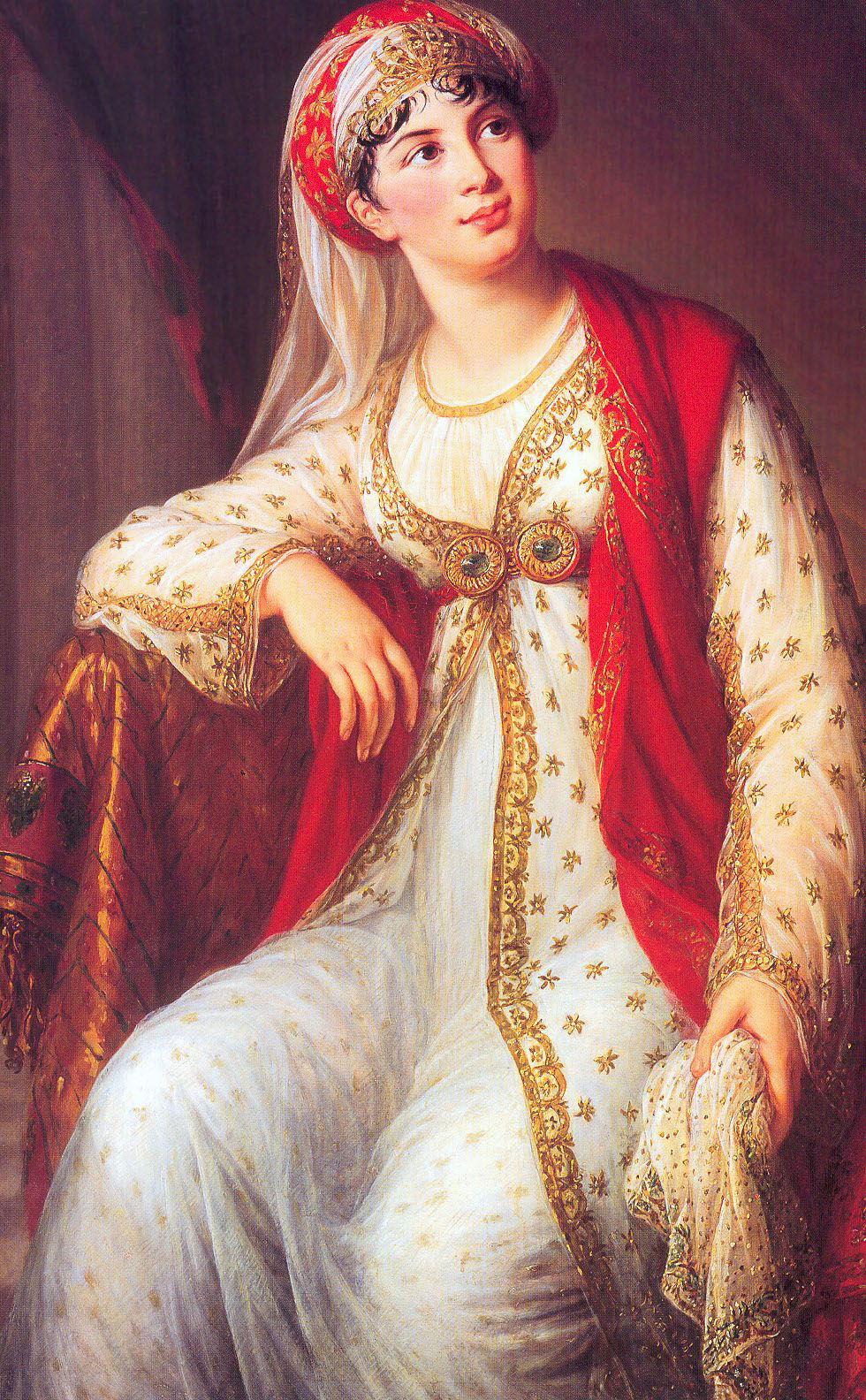
The contralto Giuseppina Grassini was a favorite of Napoleon

During the reign of Napoléon Bonaparte as First Consul and then Emperor, music in Paris was used to celebrate his victories and glory. Napoleon installed his brother Lucien as chief censor in 1800, and all musical and theater works were examined by the police before being performed. The former Academy of Music became the Académie impériale de musique. The official composer of Napoleon's regime was Jean-François Lesueur, who wrote a heroic opera, Ossian, ou Les bardes to glorify Napoleon. It was performed more than a hundred times in Paris before Napoleon's fall. Lesueur also wrote a special march for the coronation of Napoleon as Emperor at Notre-Dame, and directed the solemn mass, Te Deum and other music performed at the coronation. Lesueur wrote new opera Le Triomphe de Trajan, to celebrate Napoleon's victories at Jena, Friedland and Eylau. The opera had spectacular staging, with parades of soldiers and cavalry on stage. Lesueur continued his musical career after Napoleon's fall, as a professor of composition at the Conservatory; his future students included Hector Berlioz and Charles Gounod.

The Empress Joséphine had her own favorite composer, the Italian Gaspare Spontini, who became her official composer of both historical dramas and comedies. Spontini's first lyrical work, La vestale, had a considerable success. His next work, Fernand Cortez, was commissioned when Napoleon decided to invade Spain, and celebrated the conquest of Mexico by Hernán Cortés. Unfortunately, the French army was defeated in Spain and Fernand Cortez was pulled from the repertoire, but it made a great impression on other French composers with its grand scenic effects, a Mexican ballet and a cavalry charge, its use of drums, and its huge chorus. Napoleon recreated the grandeur of the earlier royal court, constructing a new theater at the Tuileries Palace, which was finished in 1808. He also brought together an exceptional troupe of musicians and singers from Italy, including the composer Ferdinando Paër, who became master of his household music, the castrato Girolamo Crescentini, and the contralto Giuseppina Grassini. Napoleon did not allow applause in the hall during performances. The orchestra played a special air by André Grétry when Napoleon entered the theater, and the Vivat Imperator when he departed. But, because of his military campaigns, he was rarely in Paris to enjoy them.

Napoleon gave eight theaters official status and, to avoid competition to his official theaters, he closed all the others. The Imperial Academy and the Opéra-Comique were at the top of the hierarchy; followed by the Théâtre de lEmpereur, the new Opera buffa of the Théâtre de l'Impératrice, the theater of the Empress, run by Mademoiselle Montansier. Major operas and melodramas were performed at the theater at Porte-Saint-Martin and Opéra-Comique; parodies at the Théâtre du Vaudeville, and rustic comedies at the Théâtre des Variétés. With the signing of the Concordat in 1801 between Napoleon and Pope Pius VII, the churches of Paris were re-opened, and religious music was allowed once more.

== Music during the Restoration (1815–1830) ==
=== The Opera and the Conservatory ===
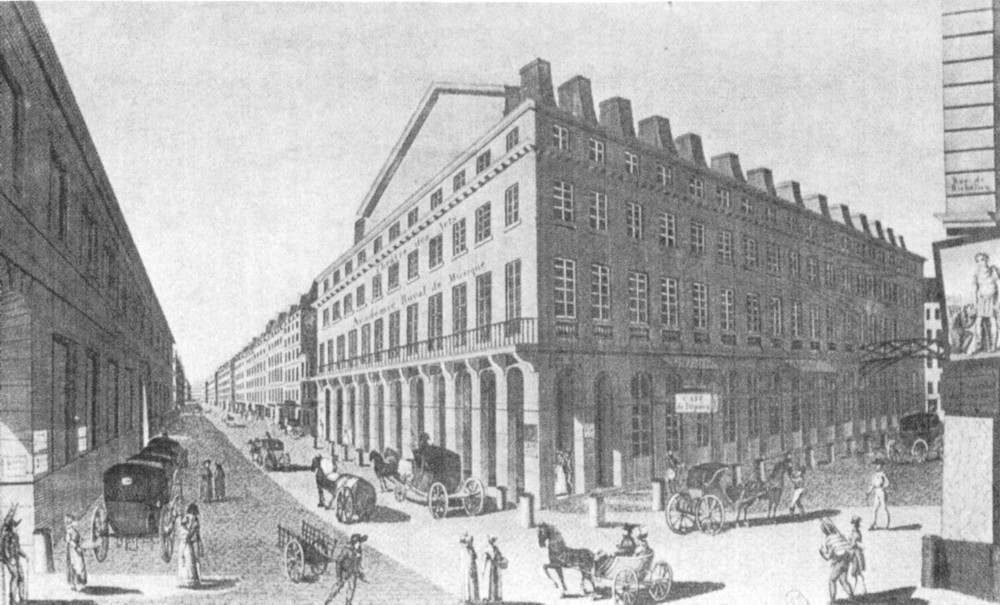
The Salle Montansier on the rue de Richelieu, home of the Paris opera, about 1820

After Napoleon's second abdication at the end of the Hundred Days in 1815, and his exile to the island of Saint Helena, the new government of Louis XVIII tried to restore the Parisian musical world to what it had been before the Revolution. The opera once again became the Royal Academy; the Conservatory, renamed the École royale de musique, was given a new department of religious music; and the composer Luigi Cherubini was commissioned to write a coronation solemn mass, the "Mass in G major", for Louis XVIII, and in 1825, the "Mass in A major" for his successor, Charles X. Spontini was named director of royal music. Lavish concerts in salons resumed in the Faubourg Saint-Germain, often given with the most popular new keyboard instrument, the piano. However, the government greatly irritated ordinary Parisians by banning music and dancing on Sundays, closing the popular guinguettes.

At the beginning of the Restoration, the Paris Opera was located in the Salle Montansier on rue de Richelieu, where the square Louvois is today. On 13 February 1820, Charles Ferdinand, Duke of Berry was assassinated at the door of the opera, and King Louis XVIII, in his grief, had the old theater demolished. In 1820–1821, the opera performed in the Salle Favart of the Théâtre des Italiens, then in the salle Louvois on rue Louvois, and, beginning on 16 August 1821, in the new opera house on rue Le Peletier, which was built out of the material of the old opera house. It was intended to be a temporary home until a new opera house was built; it was neither elegant nor well-located, but it was large and had modern lighting and stage equipment, with gas lights installed in 1822, and the first electrical lighting in 1849. It remained the primary opera venue of Paris for a half century, until the opening of the Palais Garnier.

The opera repertoire was largely familiar works of Gluck, Sacchini and Spontini, to which were added fresh works by new composers, such as François Adrien Boieldieu, Louis Joseph Ferdinand Hérold, and Daniel Auber. An opera by Carl Maria von Weber, Der Freischütz, was translated into French under the title Robin des Bois ("Robin Hood"), and presented in 1824, causing a sensation. The first of new genre of romantic and nationalist French operas, La muette de Portici by Auber, premiered in February 1829; the hero was an Italian patriot fighting against Spanish occupation and oppression. A performance of the same opera in Brussels in 1830 led to a popular uprising and the liberation of Belgium from Dutch rule. The opera also featured grand spectacles created with ingenious stage machinery and lighting, including recreations of the eruption of Mount Vesuvius and the realistic illusions of flames and moving water.

=== Rossini and the Théâtre Italien ===
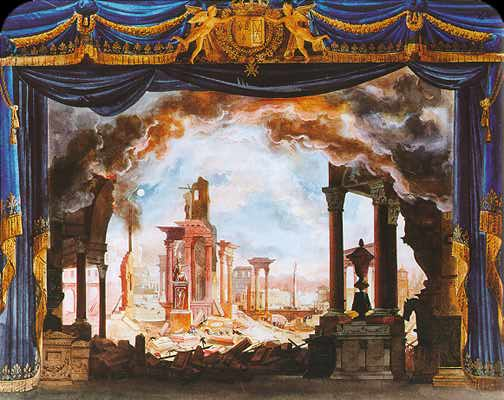
Set for the opera Le Siège de Corinthe by Rossini (1827)

The grand rival of the royal opera was the Théâtre-Italien, which beginning in 1819 performed at the Salle Favart. It was formally under the administration of the royal opera, but it had its own administrator and repertoire and produced only works in Italian. It presented the works of the composer Gioacchino Rossini, who staged his first work in the Paris, L'italiana in Algeri in 1817, followed by a series of successes. Rossini presented his most famous work, The Barber of Seville, in 1818, two years after it premiered in Rome. Rossini made modifications for the French audience, changing it from two to four acts and changing Rosina's part from a contralto to a soprano. This new version premiered at the Odéon-Théâtre on 6 May 1824, with Rossini present, and remains today the version most used in opera houses around the world. Rossini decided to settle in Paris and became the musical director of the theater. With Rossini at its head, the Théâtre-Italien had a huge success; its company included several of the finest singers in Europe, including Giulia Grisi, the niece of Napoleon's favorite, Giuseppina Grassi; and Maria Malibran, who became the most famous interpreters of the music of Rossini. After a fire burned the Salle Favart in 1838, the troupe had several homes before it finally settled in the Salle Ventadour in 1841.

Rossini continued to produce lavish operas with spectacular sets, rapid pace, the use of unusual instruments (the trombone, cymbals and triangle) and extravagant emotion. He staged Siege of Corinth (1827), followed by Moses and the comic opera Le comte Ory. He then undertook to write an opera that was entirely French; he wrote William Tell based on a play by Schiller, which premiered at the Salle Le Peletier on August 3, 1829. Though the famous overture was a success, the public reception for the rest of the opera was cool; the work was criticized for excessive length (four hours), a weak story, and a lack of action. Rossini, deeply wounded by the criticism, retired, at the age of thirty-seven, and never wrote another opera.

=== Popular music—the Goguette and the political song ===
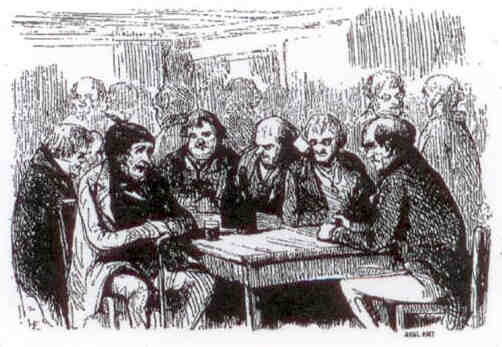
The goguette called Les joyeux in a café in 1844

The musical salons of the aristocracy were imitated by a new institution; the goguette, musical clubs formed by Paris workers, craftsmen, and employees. There were goguettes of both men and women. They usually met once a week, often in the back room of a cabaret, where they would enthusiastically sing popular, comic, and sentimental songs. During the Restoration, songs were also an important form of political expression. The poet and songwriter Pierre Jean de Béranger became famous for his songs ridiculing the aristocracy, the established church and the ultra-conservative parliament. He was imprisoned twice for his songs, in 1821 and 1828, which only added to his fame. His supporters around France sent foie gras, fine cheeses and wines to him in prison. The celebrated Paris police chief Eugène François Vidocq sent his men to infiltrate the goguettes and arrest those who sang songs ridiculing the monarch.

== Music in Paris under Louis Philippe (1830–1848) ==
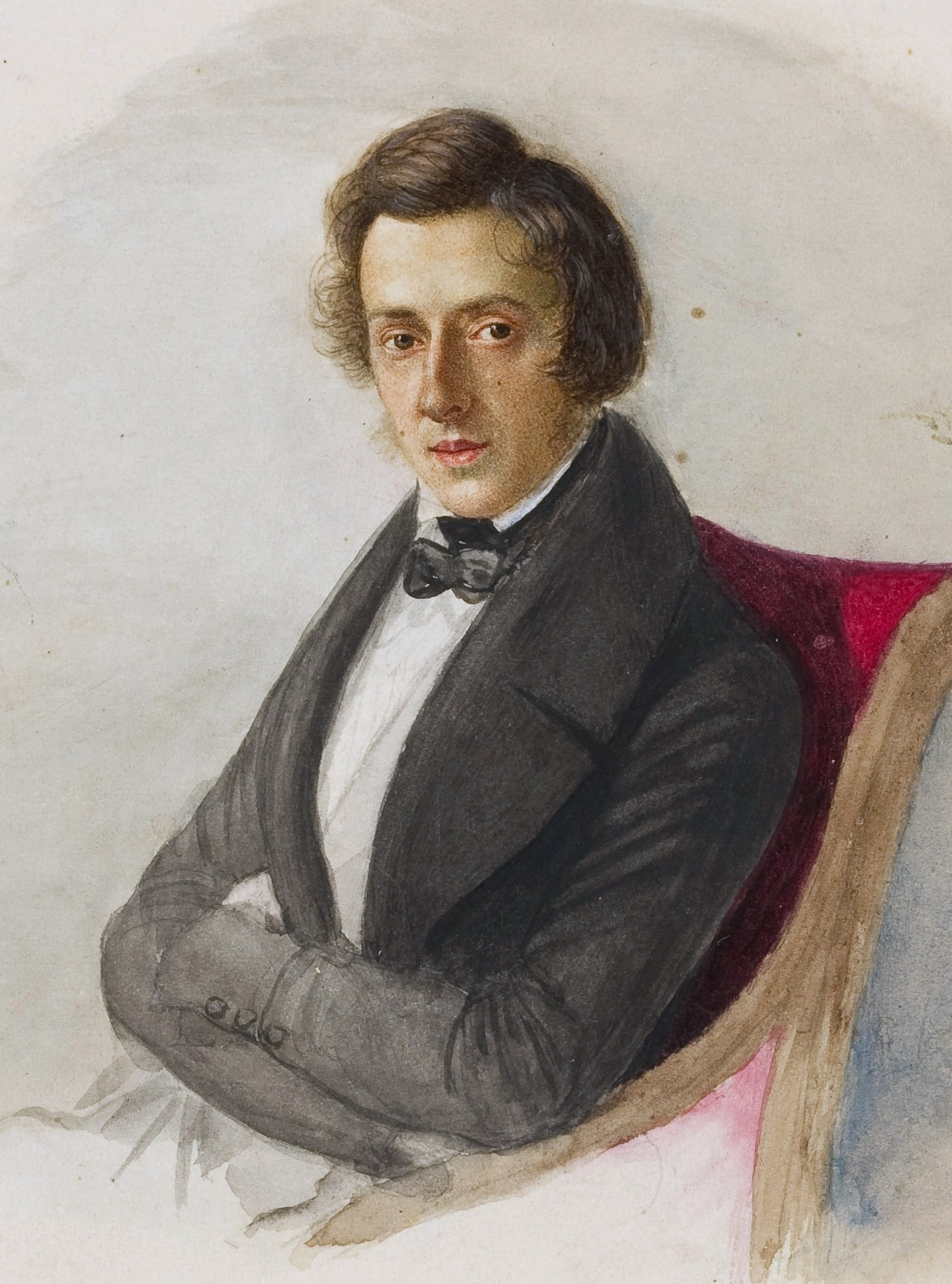
Frédéric Chopin by Maria Wodzińska (1836)

Public resentment against the Restoration government boiled over in July 1830 with an uprising in the streets of Paris, the departure of King Charles X, and the installation of the July Monarchy of Louis Philippe I. Music played its part in the 1830 Revolution; the famed tenor Adolphe Nourrit, who had starred in the operas of Rossini, went onto the stages of Paris and emotionally sang the Marseillaise, which had been forbidden during the First Empire and the Restoration. As Europe was upset by revolutions and repression, many of the finest musicians in the continent came to seek sanctuary in Paris.

The most famous was Frédéric Chopin, who arrived in Paris in September 1831 at the age of twenty-one, and did not return to Congress Poland because of the crushing of the Polish uprising against Russian rule in October 1831. Chopin gave his first concert in Paris at the Salle Pleyel on 26 February 1832, and remained in the city for most of the next eighteen years. He gave just thirty public performances during these years, preferring to give recitals in private salons. On 16 February 1838 and on 2 December 1841, he played at the Tuileries for King Louis-Philippe and the royal family. (He also gave a recital for the royal family in October 1839 in the Château de Saint-Cloud). He earned his living from commissions given by wealthy patrons, including the wife of James Mayer de Rothschild, from publishing his compositions and giving private lessons. Chopin lived at different addresses in Paris: upon his arrival in September 1831 until 1836, at 27 boulevard Poissonnière, then at 38 rue de la Chaussée-d'Antin, and 5 rue Tronchet. He had a ten-year relationship with the writer George Sand between 1837 and 1847. In 1842, they moved together to the Square d'Orléans, at 80 rue Taitbout, where the relationship ended. His last address in Paris was 12 Place Vendôme, where he moved in the second half of September 1849.

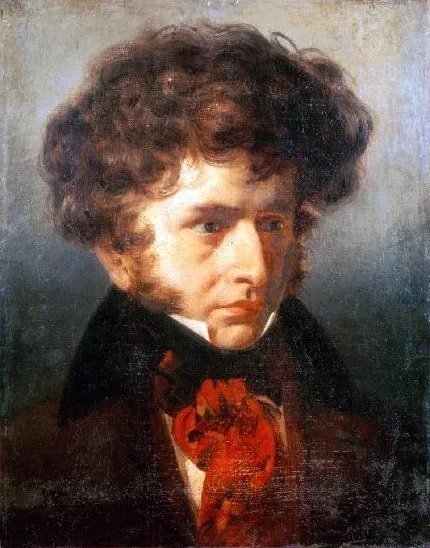
Hector Berlioz, by Émile Signol (1832)

Franz Liszt also lived in Paris during this period, composing music for the piano and giving concerts and music lessons. He lived at the Hôtel de France on rue La Fayette, not far from Chopin. The two men were friends, but Chopin did not appreciate the manner in which Liszt played variations on his music. Liszt wrote in 1837 in La Revue et Gazette musicale: "Paris is the pantheon of living musicians, the temple where one becomes a god for a century or for an hour; the burning fire which lights and then consumes all fame." The violinist Niccolò Paganini was a frequent visitor and performer in Paris. In 1836, he made an unfortunate investment in a Paris casino, and went bankrupt. He was forced to sell his collection of violins to pay his debts. Richard Wagner came to Paris in 1839, hoping to present his works on the Paris opera stages, with no success. Some interest was finally shown by the director of the Paris Opera; he rejected Wagner's music but wanted to buy the synopsis of his opera, Le Vaissau fantôme, to be put to music by a French composer, Louis-Philippe Dietsch. Wagner sold the work for five hundred francs, and returned home in 1842.

The French composer Hector Berlioz had come to Paris from Grenoble in 1821 to study medicine, which he abandoned for music in 1824, attending the Conservatory in 1826, and won the Prix de Rome for his compositions in 1830. He was working on his most famous work, the Symphonie Fantastique, at the time of the July 1830 revolution. It had its premiere on 4 December 1830.

=== The Royal Academy, Opéra-Comique and Théâtre-Italien ===
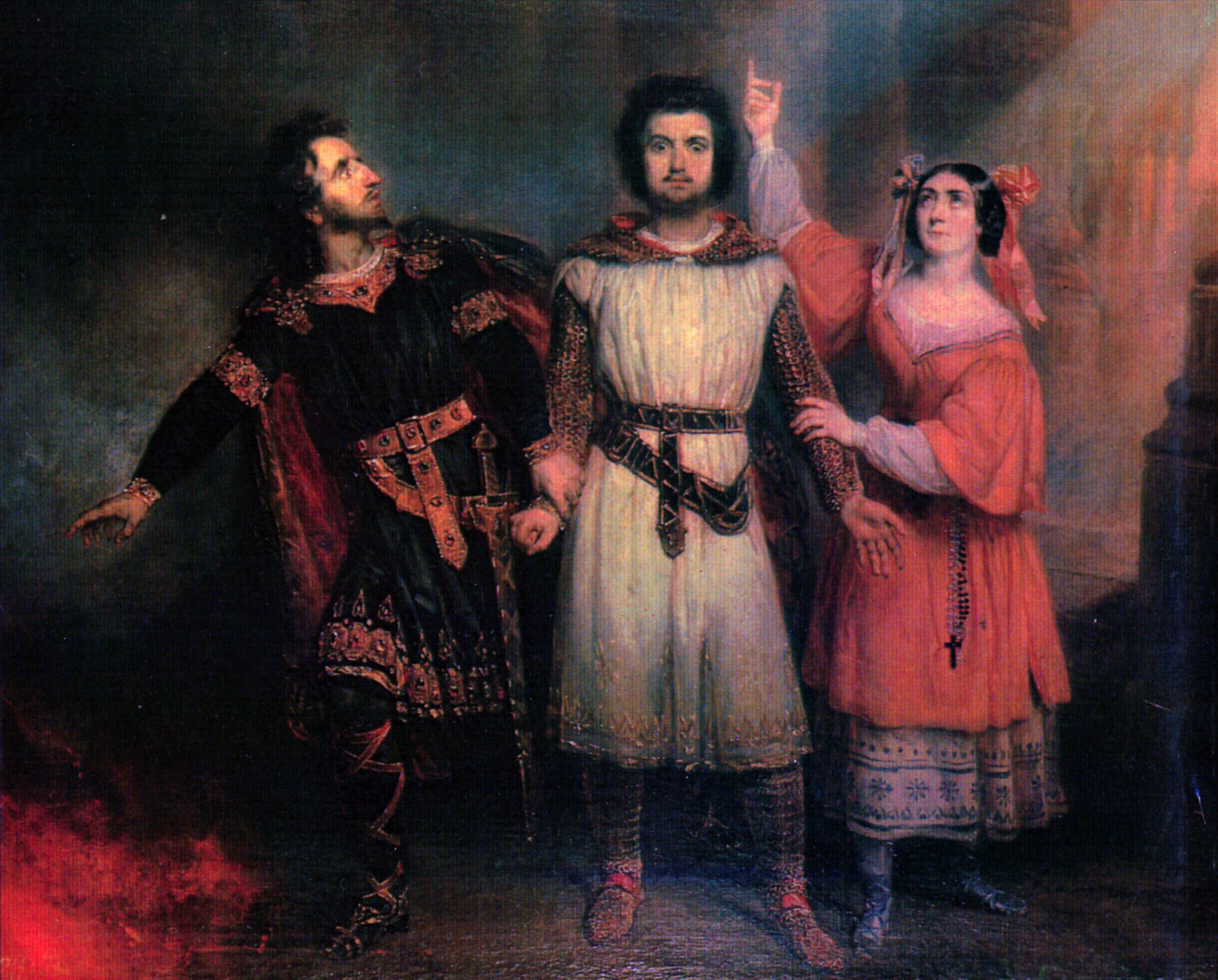
Trio from Robert le Diable by Giacomo Meyerbeer (1835)

Three Paris theaters were permitted to produce operas; The Royal Academy of Music on rue Le Peletier; the Opéra-Comique, and the Théâtre-Italien, nicknamed "Les Bouffes". The Royal Academy, financed by the government, was in dire financial difficulties. In February, the government handed over management of the theater to a gifted entrepreneur, Doctor Véron, who had become wealthy selling medicinal ointments. Véron targeted the audience of the newly wealthy Parisian businessmen and entrepreneurs; he redesigned the theater to make the loges smaller (six seats reduced to four seats), installed gas lights to improve visibility, and launched a new repertoire to make the Paris Opera "both brilliant and popular". The first great success of the new regime was Robert le Diable by the German composer Giacomo Meyerbeer, which premiered on November 21, 1831. The opera combined the German orchestral style with the Italian lyric singing style; it was an immense critical and popular success. Meyerbeer wrote a succession of popular operas, including At the end of his four-year contract, Doctor Véron retired, leaving the Opera in an admirable financial and artistic position.

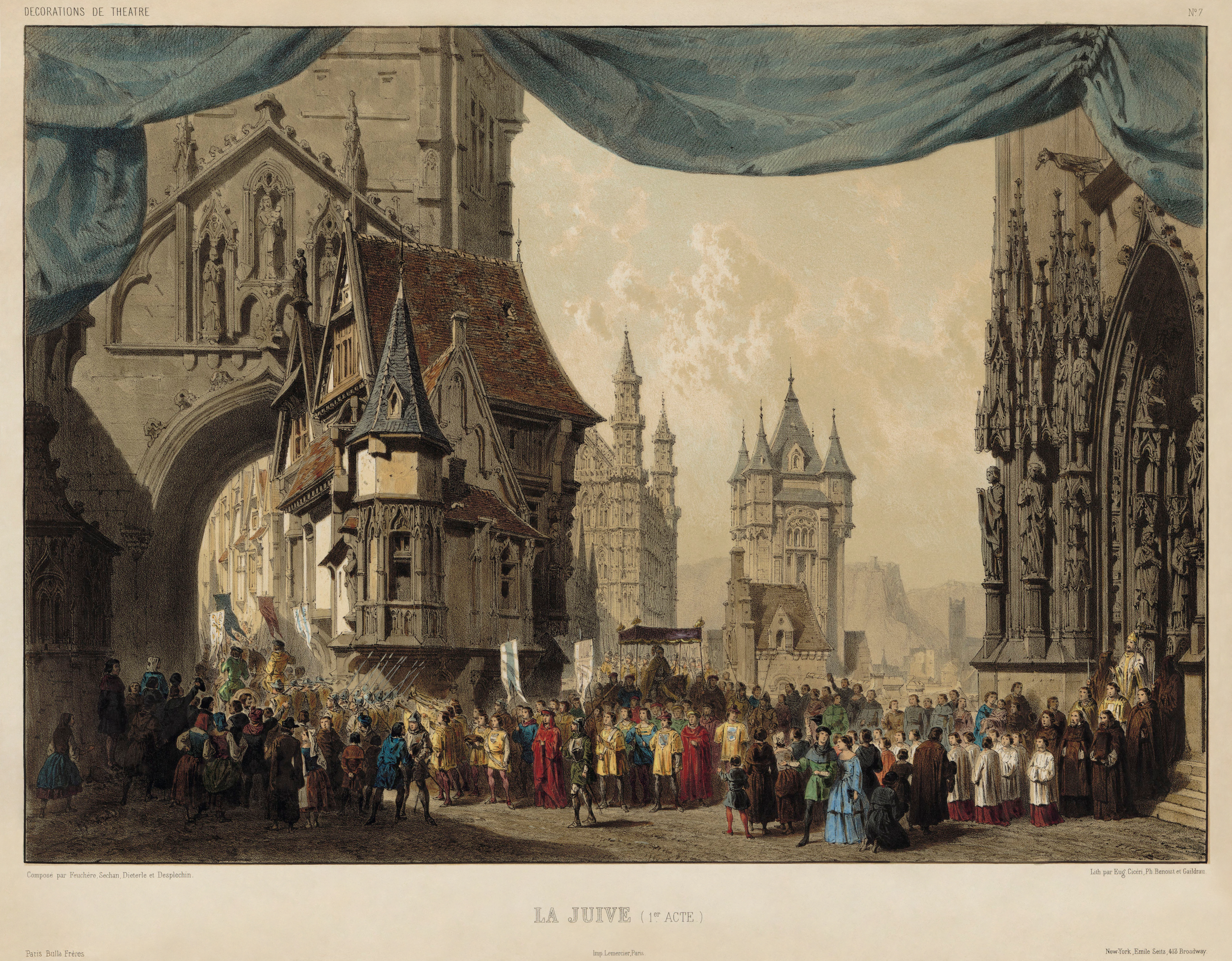
Set for Act 1 of La Juive at the Opéra-Comique (1835)

The Opéra-Comique also enjoyed great success, largely due to the talents of the scenarist Eugène Scribe, who wrote ninety works for the theater, put to music by forty different composers, including Daniel Auber, Giacomo Meyerbeer, Fromental Halévy (La Juive (1835)), Cherubini, Donizetti, Gounod and Verdi (for whom he wrote Les vêpres siciliennes). Scribe left behind the grand mythological themes of earlier French opera, and wrote stories from a variety of historical periods which, with a mixture of strong emotion, humor and romanticism, exactly suited the taste of Parisian audiences.

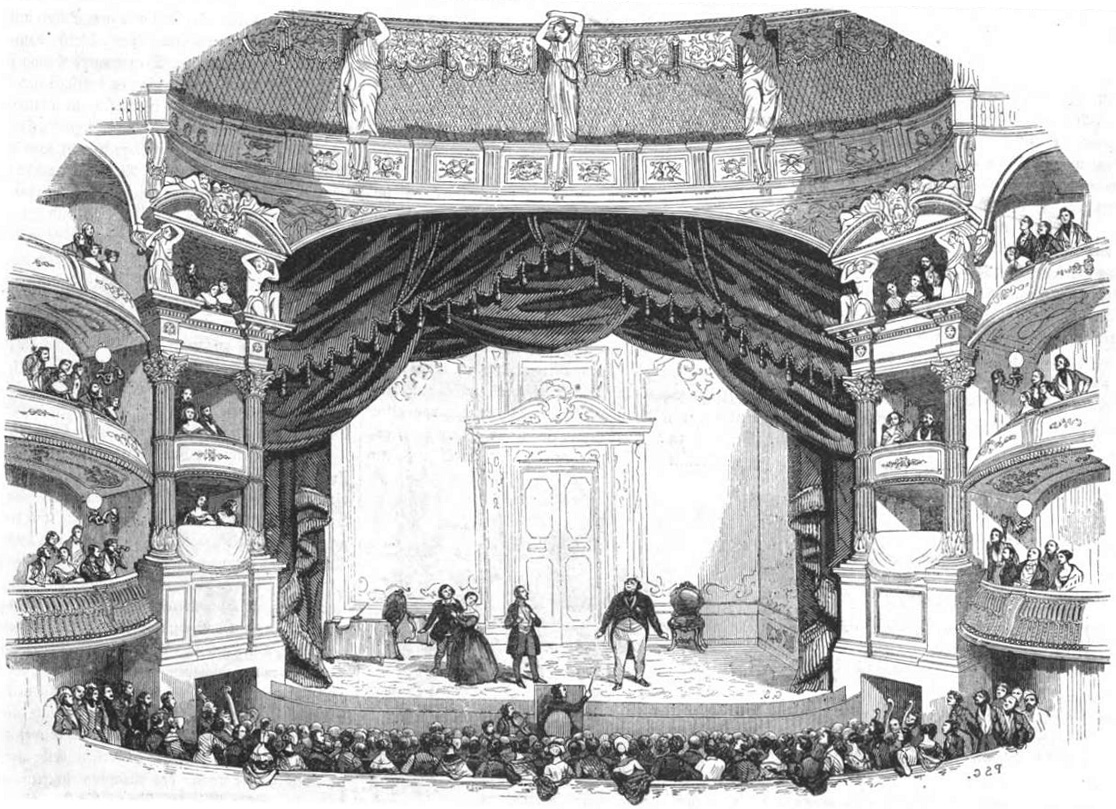
Premiere of Donizetti's Don Pasquale in 1843 by the Théâtre-Italien at the Salle Ventadour

The Théâtre-Italien completed the grand trio of Paris opera houses. After the fire at the Salle Favart, it moved briefly to the Odéon Theater and then permanently to the Salle Ventadour. In their repertoire, the ballet played a very small part, part, the costumes and sets were not remarkable, and the number of works was small; only a dozen new operas were staged between 1825 and 1870; but they included several famous works of Bel Canto opera, including I Puritani by Bellini and Marino Faliero and Don Pasquale by Donizetti. Verdi lived primarily in Paris between 1845 and 1847, and staged four of his operas at the Théâtre-Italien; Nabucco, Ernani, I due Foscari, and Jérusalem. The leading Italian singers also came regularly to sing at the Théâtre-Italien, including Giovanni Rubini, the creator of the role of Arturo in Bellini's I Puritani, Giulia Grisi, Fanny Persiani, Henriette Sontag and Giuditta Pasta, who created the role of Norma in Bellini's opera.

French composers including Hector Berlioz struggled in vain against the tide of Italian operas. Berlioz succeeded in getting his opera Benvenuto Cellini staged at the Royal Academy in 1838, but it closed after just three performances, and was not staged again in France during his lifetime. Berlioz complained in the Journal des Debats that there were six operas by Donizetti in Paris playing in one year. "Monsieur Donizetti has the air to treat us like a conquered country," he wrote, "it is a veritable war of invasion. We can no longer call them the lyric theaters of Paris, just the lyric theaters of Monsieur Donizetti."

=== The Conservatory and the symphony orchestra ===
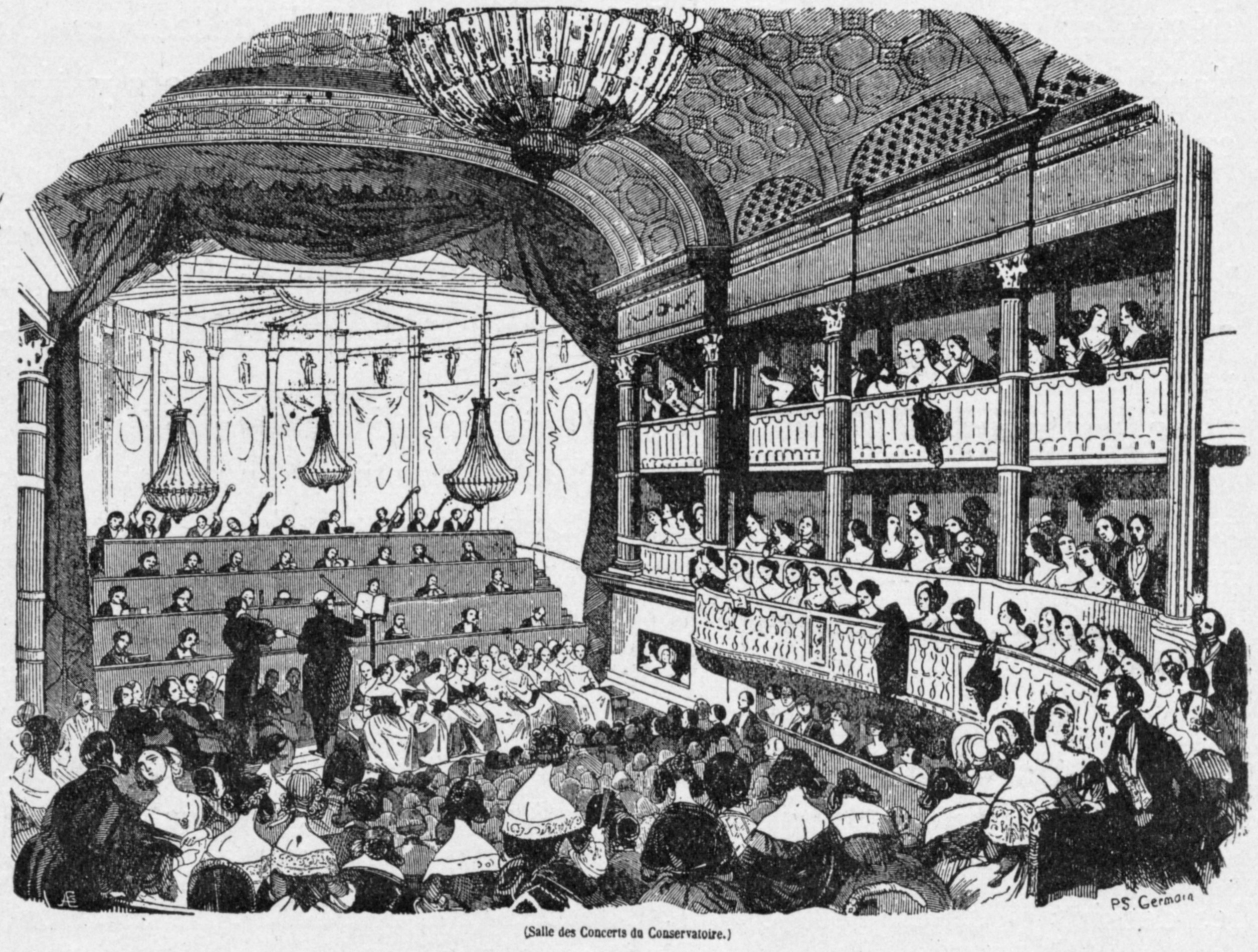
A concert at the Salle of the Paris Conservatory (March 1843)

With the growing popularity of classical music and the arrival of so many talented musicians, Paris encountered a shortage of concert halls. The best hall in the city was that of the Paris Conservatory on rue Bergére, which had excellent acoustics and could seat a thousand persons. Berlioz premiered his Symphonie Fantastique there on December 30, 1830; on December 29, 1832, Berlioz presented the Symphony again, along with two new pieces, Lelio and Harold en Italie, which he wrote specially for Paganini to play. At the end of the performance, with Victor Hugo and Alexandre Dumas in the audience, Paganini bowed down humbly before Berlioz. in tribute.

The Concert Society of the Paris Conservatory was founded in 1828, especially to play the symphonies of Beethoven; one at each performance, along with works by Mozart, Hayden and Handel. It was the first professional symphonic association in Europe. A second symphony association, the Societé de Sainte-Cecile, was founded shortly afterwards, which played more modern music; it presented the Paris premieres of Wagner's Tannhäuser overture, works by Schubert, the Symphonie Italienne of Mendelssohn, the Fuite en Égypte of Berlioz, and the first works of Charles Gounod and Georges Bizet.

=== Birth of the romantic ballet ===
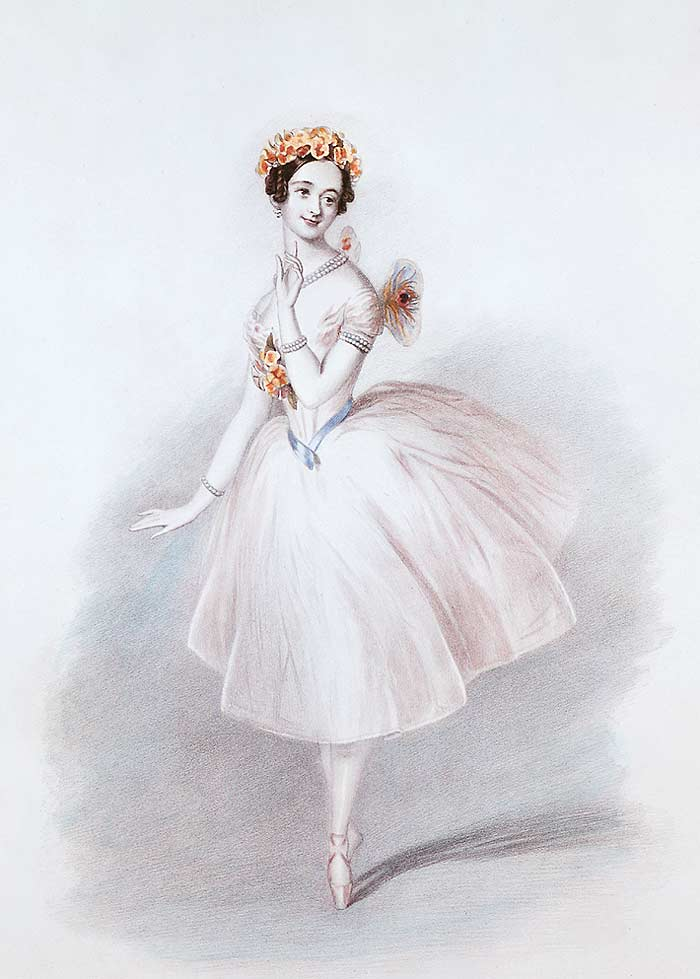
Marie Taglioni in La Sylphide (1832)

The ballet had been an integral part of the Paris Opera since the time of Louis XIV the 17th century. A new style, Romantic ballet, was born on March 12, 1832, with the premiere of La Sylphide at the Salle Le Peletier, with choreography by Filippo Taglioni and music by Jean-Madeleine Schneitzhoeffer. Taglioni designed the work as a showcase for his daughter Marie. La Sylphide was the first ballet where dancing en pointe had an aesthetic rationale and was not merely an acrobatic stunt. Other romantic ballets that had their first performances at the Opera were Giselle (1841), Paquita (1846) and Le corsaire (1856) Among the great ballerinas to grace the stage of the Opéra during this time were Marie Taglioni, Carlotta Grisi, Carolina Rosati, Fanny Elssler, Lucile Grahn, and Fanny Cerrito.

Lucien Petipa danced the male lead in Giselle at its premiere, and his younger brother Marius Petipa also danced for a time at the Paris Opera. Marius Petipa moved from Paris to Saint Petersburg, where he became the ballet-master for the Russian Imperial ballet and created many celebrated ballets, including The Sleeping Beauty, La Bayadère and The Nutcracker.

=== Balls, Concerts-Promenades and the romance ===
The Champs-Élysées was redeveloped in the 1830s with public gardens at either end, and became a popular place for Parisians to promenade. It was soon lined with restaurants, cafes-chantants. and pleasure gardens where outdoor concerts and balls were held. The Café Turc opened a garden with a series of concert-promenades in the spring of 1833, which alternated symphonic music with quadrilles and airs for dancing. The 17-year-old jacques Offenbach wrote his first compositions for the dance orchestra at the Café Turc. The Tivoli, the Bazar of rue Saint-Honoré and the Casino Paganini competed with the Café Turc. In 1837, the King of the Viennese waltz, Johann Strauss, came in person to in Paris, competing with the French waltz king, Philippe Musard. The outdoor concerts and balls did not stay in fashion for long; most of the gardens began to close after 1838, and Musard took charge instead of the famous masked balls at the Paris Opera. The romance, a song with a simple, tender melody, sentimental words, accompanied on the piano, became the fashion in the Paris salons. Thousands of copies were sold by Paris publishers.

=== The piano and the saxophone ===
The July monarchy saw a surge in sales of instruments, especially pianos, for the French upper and middle class. Production of pianos in Paris tripled between 1830 and 1847, from four thousand to eleven thousand a year. The companies organized concerts and sponsored famous musicians to promote their brands. Chopin was contracted to play exclusively the Pleyel piano, while Liszt played on the Érard piano. The Paris firms of Pleyel, Érard, Herz, Pape and Kriegelstein exported pianos around the world. The crafts of other instruments also flourished; the Parisian firm of Cavaillé-Coll reconstructed the great organs of Notre-Dame, Saint-Sulpice, and the Basilica of Saint-Denis, which had been destroyed during the French Revolution.

In 1842 the Belgian Adolphe Sax, 28-years old, arrived in Paris with his new invention, the saxophone. He won a silver medal for his new instrument at the Paris Exposition of French Industry in 1844, and in April 1845 won a competition held by the French Army on the Champs-de-Mars, in which a fanfare was played on traditional instruments and then on the instruments of Adolphe Sax. The jury chose the instrument of Sax, and it was adapted by the French Army, and then by orchestras and ensembles throughout the world.

=== Popular music—street musicians and goguettes ===
At the beginning of the 1830s, the Paris police counted 271 wandering street musicians, 220 saltimbanques, 106 players of the barbary organ, and 135 itinerant street singers. The goguettes, or working class singing-clubs, continued to grow in the popularity, meeting in the back rooms of cabarets. The repertoire of popular songs ranged from romantic to comic and satirical, to political and revolutionary, especially in the 1840s. in June, 1848, the musical clubs were banned from meeting, as the government tried, without success, to stop the political unrest, which finally exploded into the 1848 French Revolution.

=== The 1848 Revolution and the Second Republic ===
following the 1848 Revolution and the abdication of Louis-Philippe, the censorship of Paris theaters was briefly abolished. The Opera was renamed the Théâtre de la Nation, then Opéra-Théâtre de la Nation, then Académie nationale de musique. A new musical theater, the Théâtre-Lyrique, was created, devoted to presenting the works of young French composers, who had been largely ignored during the July monarchy. It was located on the Boulevard du Temple, the new theater district, in a building which had previously been occupied by the theater founded by Alexander Dumas to present historical plays.

The cafés chantants became increasingly popular, spreading from the Champs Élysées to the Grand boulevards. Some, like the Café des Ambassadeurs, had outdoor concert gardens lit by gaslights. They presented romances by popular singers, and also a new comic genre, the minstrel show, featuring French singers with blackened faces playing the banjo and violin. The famous music cafés included the Moka on rue de la Lune, the Folies and Eldorado on boulevard Strasbourg, and the Alcazar on rue de Faubourg-Poissonniére,

== The Second Empire ==
=== The Imperial Opera—Verdi and Wagner ===
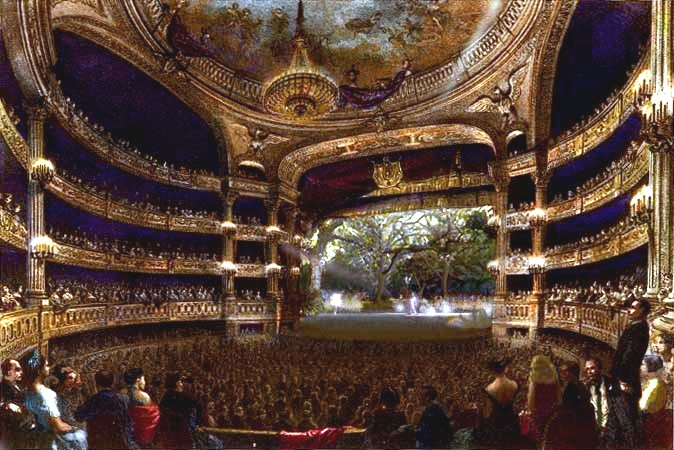
The Grand salle of the Royal Academy of Music on rue Le Peletier, home of the Paris Opera before the completion of the Palais Garnier in 1875

During the reign of Emperor Napoleon III (1852–1870), the top of the hierarchy of Paris theaters was the Académie Imperial, or Imperial Opera Theatre, in the Salle Peletier. The opera house on Rue le Peletier could seat 1800 spectators. There were three performances a week, scheduled so as not to compete with the other major opera house in the city, Les Italiens. The best seats were in the forty boxes, which could each hold four or six persons, on the first balcony. One of the boxes could be rented for the entire season for 7500 francs. One of the major functions of the opera house was to be a meeting place for Paris society, and for this reason the performances were generally very long, with as many as five intermissions. Ballets were generally added in the middle of operas, to create additional opportunities for intermissions. The Salle Peletier had one infamous moment in its history; on 14 January 1858, a group of Italian extreme nationalists attempted to kill Napoleon III at the entrance of the opera house; they set off several bombs, which killed eight people and injured one hundred and fifty persons, and splattered the Empress Eugénie de Montijo with blood, though the Emperor was unharmed.

Giuseppe Verdi played an important part in the glory of the Paris opera. He had first performed Nabucco in Paris in 1845 at the Théâtre-Italien, followed by Luisa Miller and Il trovatore He signed a new contract with the Paris Opera in 1852, and wanted absolute perfection for his next Parisian project, Les Vêpres siciliennes He complained that the Paris orchestra and chorus were unruly and undisciplined, and rehearsed them an unheard-of one hundred and sixty-one times before he felt they were ready. His work was rewarded; the opera was a critical and popular success, performed 150 times, rather than the originally proposed forty performances. He was unhappy, however, that his operas were less successful in Paris than those of his chief rival, Meyerbeer; he returned to Italy and did not come back for several years. He was persuaded to return to stage Don Carlos, commissioned especially for the Paris Opera. Once again he ran into troubles; one singer took him to court over the casting, and rivalries between other singers poisoned the production. He wrote afterwards, "I am not a composer for Paris I believe in inspiration; others only care about how the pieces are put together".

Napoleon III intervened personally to have Richard Wagner come back to Paris; Wagner rehearsed the orchestra sixty-three times for the first French production of Tannhäuser on March 13, 1861. Unfortunately, Wagner was unpopular with both the French critics and with the members of the Jockey Club, an influential French social society. During the premiere, with Wagner in the audience, the Jockey Club members whistled and jeered from the first notes of the Overture. After just three performances, the Opera was pulled from the repertoire. Wagner got his revenge in 1870, when the Prussian Army captured Napoleon III and surrounded Paris; he wrote a special piece of music to celebrate the event, Ode to the German Army at Paris.

Napoleon III wanted a new opera house to be the centerpiece connecting the new boulevards he was constructing on the right bank. The competition was won by Charles Garnier and the first stone was laid by the Emperor in July 1862, but flooding of the basement caused the construction to proceed very slowly. As the building rose, it was covered with a large shed so the sculptors and artists could create the elaborate exterior decoration. The shed was taken off on August 15, 1867, in time for the Paris Universal Exposition, so visitors and Parisians could see the glorious new building; but the inside was not finished until 1875, after Napoleon's fall.

=== Hervé, Offenbach and the Opéra Bouffes ===
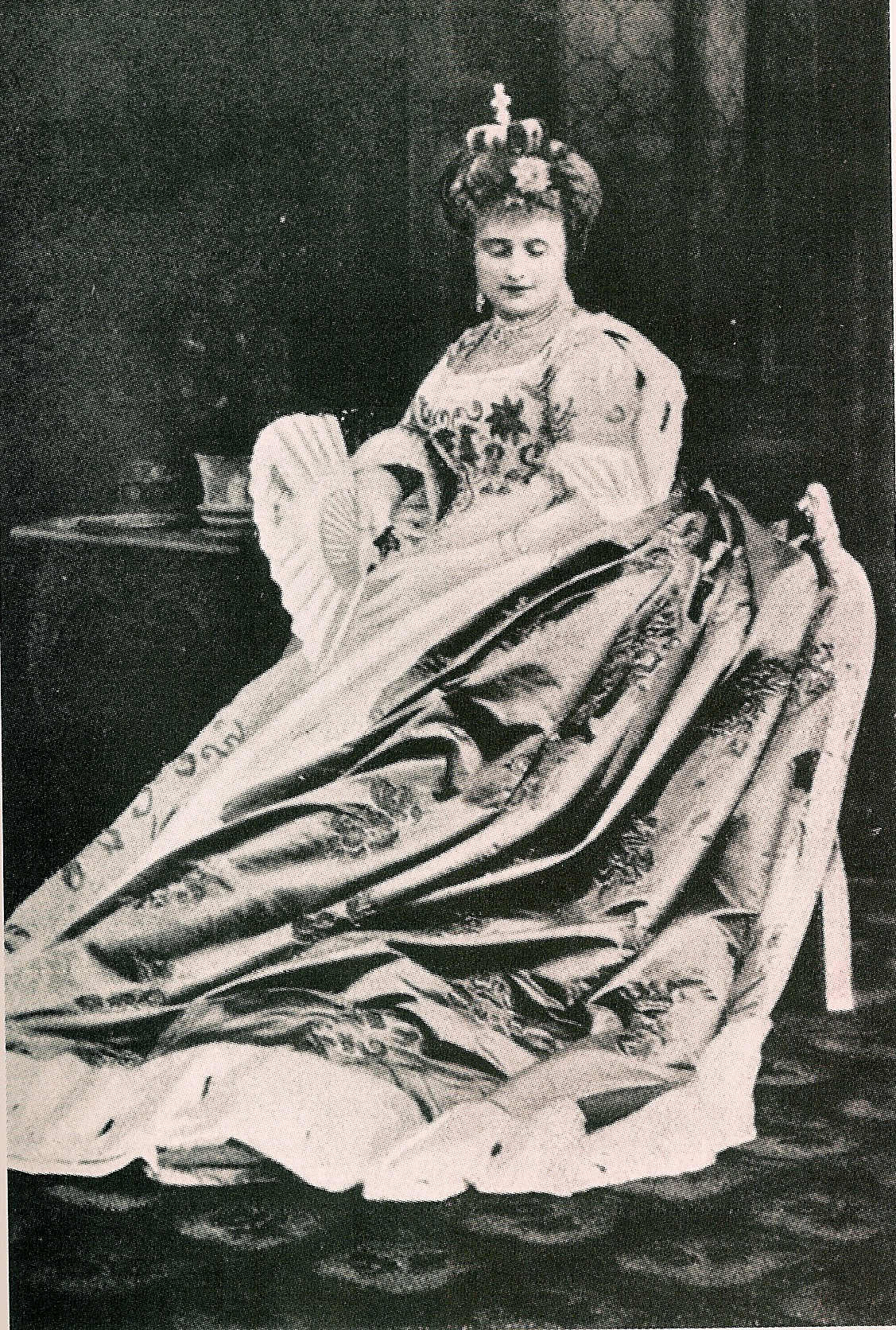
Hortense Schneider as la Grande-Duchesse de Gérolstein

The operetta was born in Paris with the work of Louis Auguste Florimond Ronger, better known under the name of Hervé. His first operetta was called Don Quilchotte et Sancho Panza, performed in 1848 at the théâtre Montmartre. In the beginning they were short comic works or parodies, with a combination of songs, dance and dialogue, rarely with more than two persons on stage, and rarely longer than one act. Early operettas by Hervé was named Latrouillat and Truffaldini or the Inconvenience of a vendetta infinitely too prolonged and Agammemnon or the Camel with Two humps. Hervé opened a new theater, the Folies-Concertantes, on the Boulevard du Temple in 1854, later renamed the Folies-Nouvelle. The new genre was termed Opera Bouffe; works by Hervé appeared at a half-dozen theaters in the city, though the genre was ignored by the opera and the other official theaters.

In 1853, the young German-born musician and composer Jacques Offenbach, then director of the orchestra of the Comedie-Française, wrote his first operetta in the new style, Pepita for the Théatre des Varietes. It was a success, but Offenbach was still unable to perform his works in the official theaters. During the first Paris Universal Exposition, he opened his own theater, the Bouffes-Parisiens, in an old theater at the Carré Marigny on the Champs-Élysées. It was an immense success; Rossini termed Offenbach "The Mozart of the Champs-Élysées". Offenbach moved to a larger theatre on the passage Choiseul, and presented his next operetta, Ba-ta-clan, which also enjoyed spectacular success. In 1858 Offenbach wrote a more serious and ambitious work, Orphée aux enfers, a four-act opera with a large cast and chorus. It was also a popular and critical success; Emperor Napoleon III attended, and afterwards presented Offenbach with French citizenship. With the approval of the Emperor, the official theaters of Paris were finally open to Offenbach, and his works became popular with the upper classes. He achieved further success with La Belle Hélène with Hortense Schneider in the leading role; then, again with Schneider, in La Vie parisienne ad la Grande-Duchesse de Gérolstein In 1867, five different Paris theaters were staging works by Offenbach. He was the champion of the Paris operetta, but he also had the ambition to be considered a serious composer of orchestral works; unfortunately he died before the successful premiere of his most ambitious orchestral work, the Contes d'Hoffmann.

=== The Théâtre Italien, the Théâtre-Lyrique, and the Opera-Comique ===
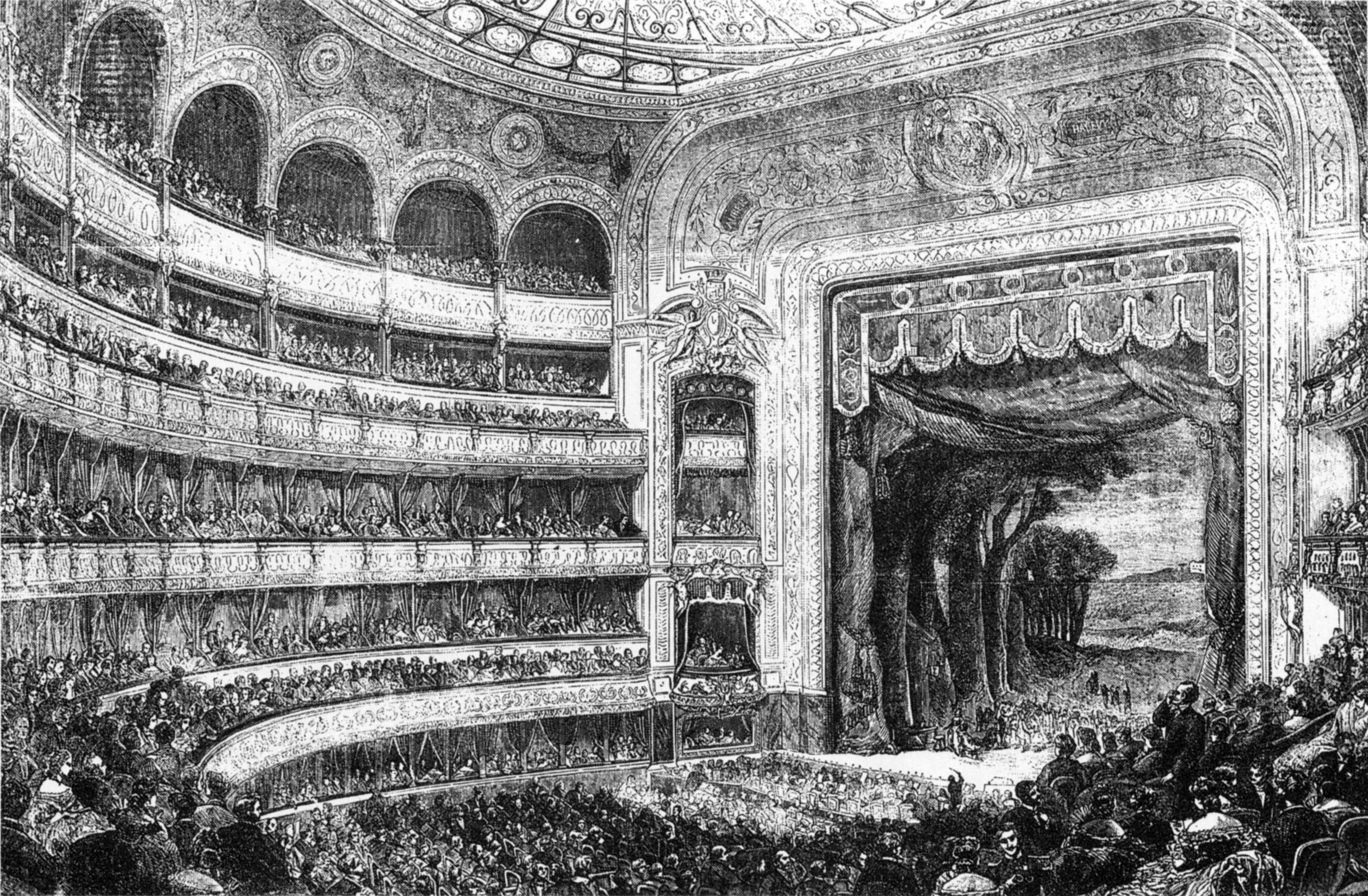
The Théâtre Lyrique, on Place Chatelet, in 1869. It hosted the first performances of the opera Faust and Romeo et Juliette by Charles Gounod, and of The Pearl Fishers by Georges Bizet.

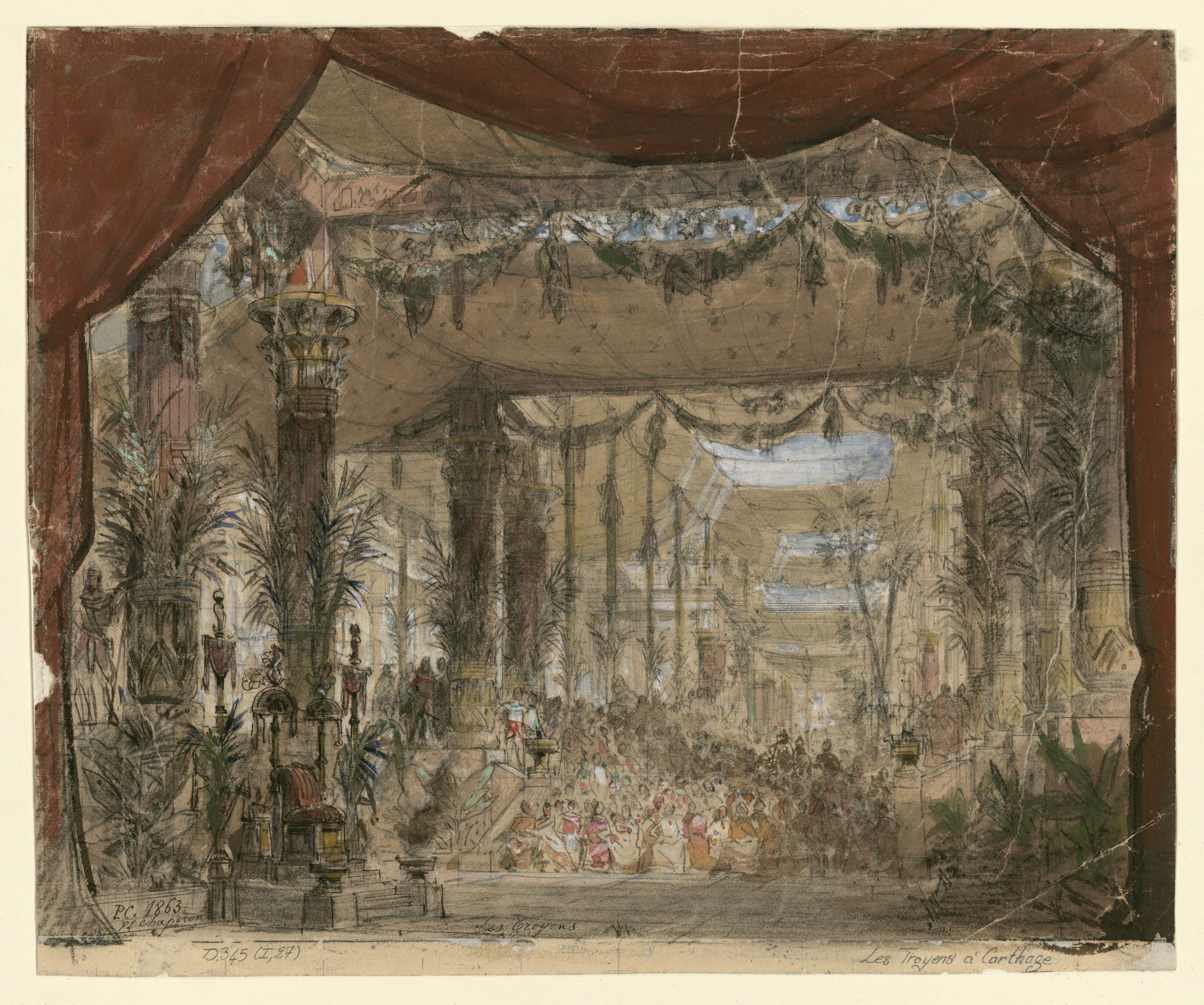
The Théâtre Lyrique was known for its lavish sets and staging. The throne room of Didon for the opera Les Troyens by Berlioz. a Carthage (1863)

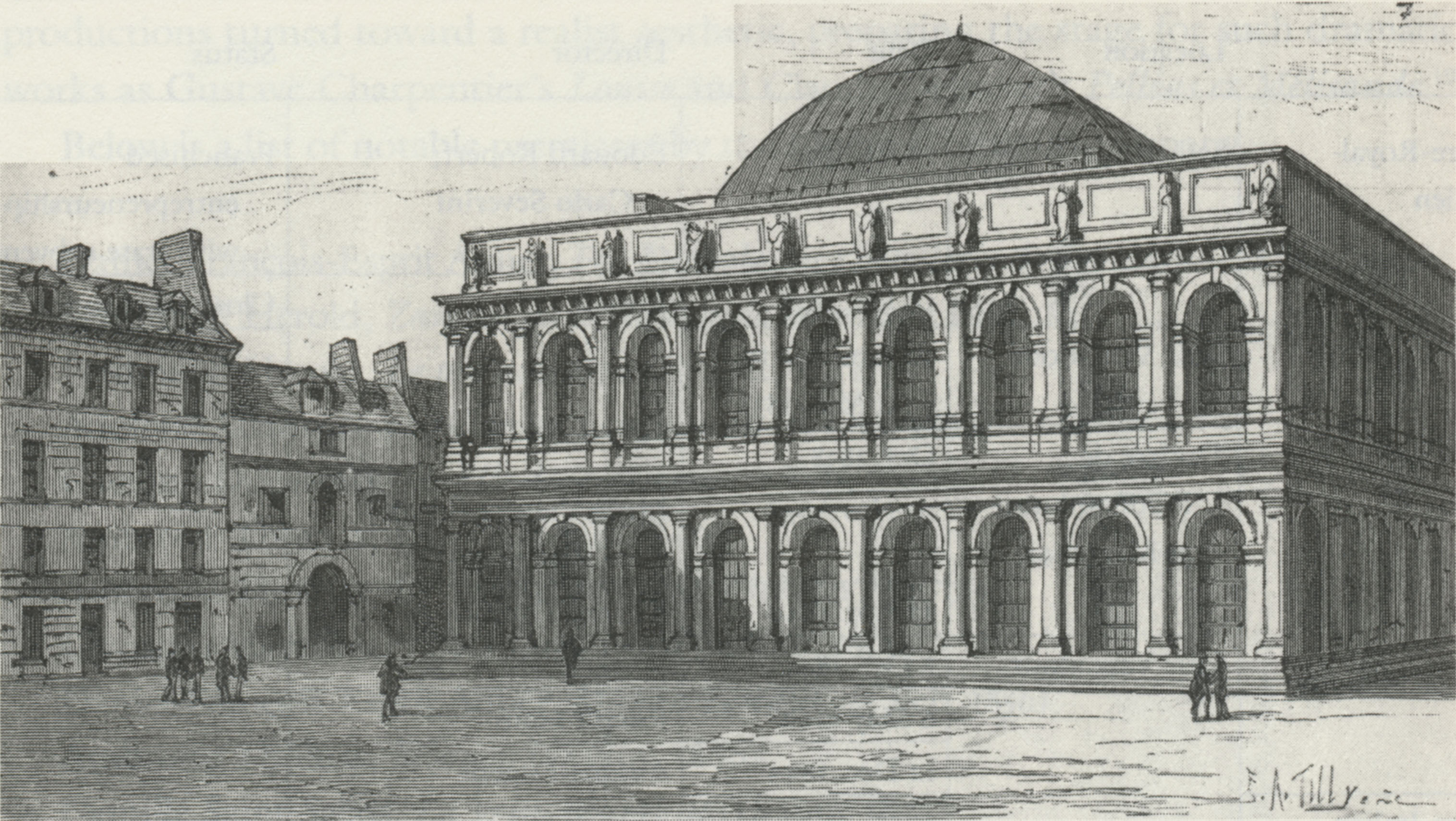
The Salle Ventadour was the home of the Théâtre-Italien; The first French performances of the operas of Verdi were staged there, and the famed soprano Adelina Patti sang there regularly during the Second Empire.

Besides the Imperial Opera Theater, Paris had three other important opera houses; the Théâtre Italien, the Opera-Comique, and the Théâtre Lyrique.

The Théâtre Italien was the based at the Salle Ventadour, and hosted the French premieres of several by Giuseppe Verdi, including Il Trovatore, La Traviata (1856), Rigoletto (1857) and Un ballo in maschera (1861). Verdi conducted his Requiem there, and Richard Wagner conducted a concert of selections from his operas. The soprano Adelina Patti had an exclusive contract to sing with the Italiens when she was in Paris.

The Théâtre Lyrique was originally located on the Rue de Temple, the famous "Boulevard de Crime," but when that part of the street was demolished to make room for the Place de la Republique, Napoleon III built a new theater for them at Place du Châtelet. The Lyrique was famous for putting on operas by new composers; it staged the first French performance of Rienzi by Richard Wagner; the first performance of Les pêcheurs de perles (1863), the first opera by the 24-year-old Georges Bizet; the first performances of the operas Faust (1859) and Roméo et Juliette (1867) by Charles Gounod; and the first performance of Les Troyens (1863) by Hector Berlioz.

The Opéra-Comique was located in the Salle Favart, and staged both comedies and serious works. It staged the first performances of Mignon by Ambroise Thomas (1866) and of La grand'tante, the first opera of Jules Massenet (1867).

=== Romantic ballet ===
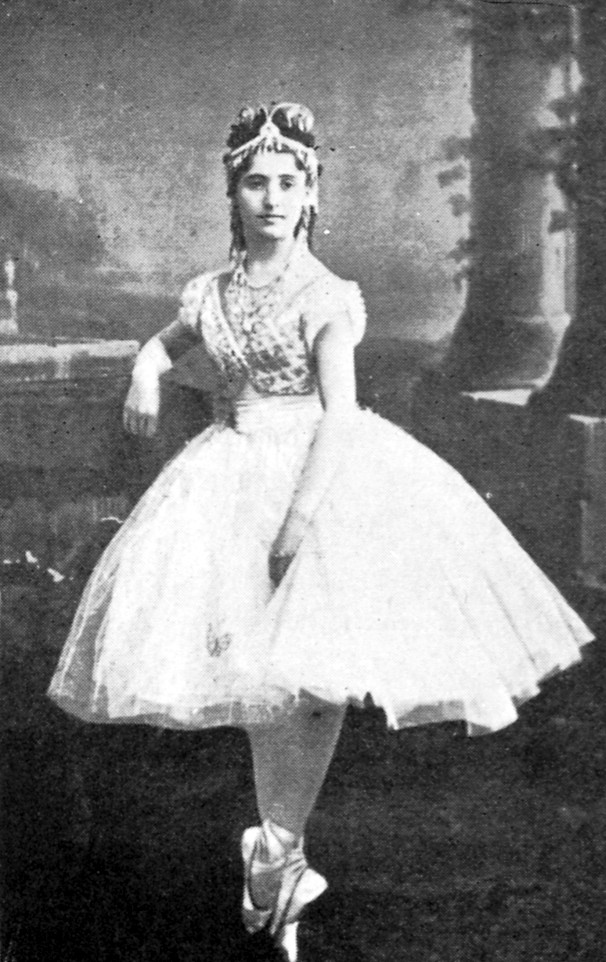
Giuseppina Bozzacchi in the role of Swanhilde in Coppélia (1870)

Paris also had an enormous influence on the development of romantic ballet, thanks to the ballet troupe of the Paris Opera and its famous ballet masters. The first performance of Le Corsaire, choreographed by the ballet master of the opera, Joseph Mazilier to the music of Adolphe Adam, took place at the Paris Opera on January 23, 1856. Coppélia was originally choreographed by Arthur Saint-Léon to the music of Léo Delibes, and was based upon two stories by E. T. A. Hoffmann: It premiered on 25 May 1870 at the Théâtre Impérial l'Opéra, with the 16-year-old Giuseppina Bozzacchi in the principal role of Swanhilde. Its first flush of success was interrupted by the Franco-Prussian War and the Siege of Paris (which also led to the early death of Giuseppina Bozzacchi, on her 17th birthday), but eventually it became the most-performed ballet at the Opéra.

=== The Cirque-Napoleon, concerts in the parks, and the Paris Expositions ===
Napoleon III re-established the custom of concerts at the imperial court, performed at the Louvre, with a new orchestra composed of students at the Paris Conservatory under the direction of Jules Pasdeloup. To reach a broader public, in 1861 he began a series of concerts by the orchestra at the huge Cirque-Napoléon (now the Cirque d'hiver) which could four thousand persons. Admission was fifty centimes. 1861 Pasdeloup decided to widen the audience for his orchestra. Besides playing the classical works of Beethoven, Mozart, Haydn and Mendelssohn, the orchestra performed new works by Schumann, Wagner, Berlioz, Gounod, and Saint-Saëns.

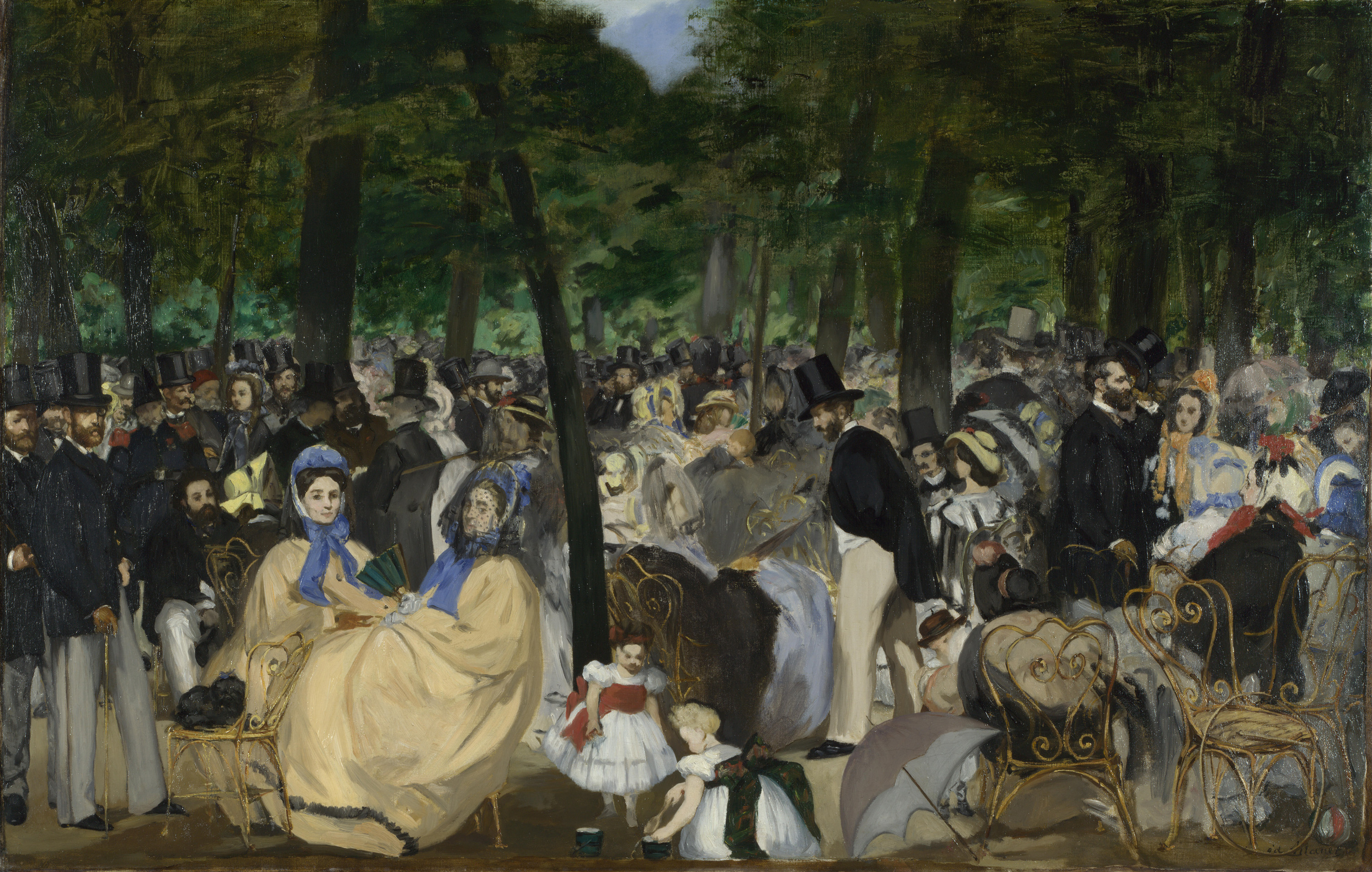
A concert in the Tuileries Garden, by Édouard Manet (1862)

Napoleon had built a large number of new parks and squares in Paris, including the Bois de Boulogne and the Bois de Vincennes. The Emperor had bandstands installed in the new parks, and organized public concerts. Amateur as well as professional and military musicians were invited to take part in the concerts. The repertoire included classical music, military music, quadrilles, polkas and waltzes, and the latest music from Paris musical theater. Another force promoting musical education in Paris was the Orpheonic movement, which led to the creation of many new amateur orchestras and choral societies. Gounod directed the Orphéon of Paris between 1852 and 1856.

The Paris Universal Expositions of 1855 and 1867, highlighting technological progress, also had an important musical component. New musical instruments, such as the saxophone and the Steinway piano, were put on display, and several new compositions were commissioned especially for performance during the expositions, including Verdi's Les Vêpres siciliennes and Don Carlos, Offenbach's La Grand-Duchesse de Gerolstein and La Vie parisienne, and Gounod's Romeo et Juliette.

=== Cafés-Concerts ===
During the Second Empire, the Café-Concert became extremely popular in Paris; by 1872, there were nearly one hundred and fifty in the city. Some were very simple; a cafe with a piano or small organ; others had an orchestra and professional singers. The café-concerts were strictly regulated, to prevent them from competing openly with the musical theaters. The singers were not allowed to wear costumes, and there could no sets, dialogue, or dancing by the performers. No more than forty songs could be sung in an evening, and the owners of the cafes were required to submit the musical program for each night to the police for review. If a song sounded subversive, the program was cancelled. After an actress of the Comedie-Française was condemned by the police for reciting classical verse at the Café Eldorado, and for wearing a long black dress rather street clothing, the law was relaxed in 1867. Thereafter cafe performers could wear costumes, recite dialogue, and have scenery on the stage. This opened the way for a new musical genre, the music hall, a few years later.

== The Belle Époque (1872–1913) ==
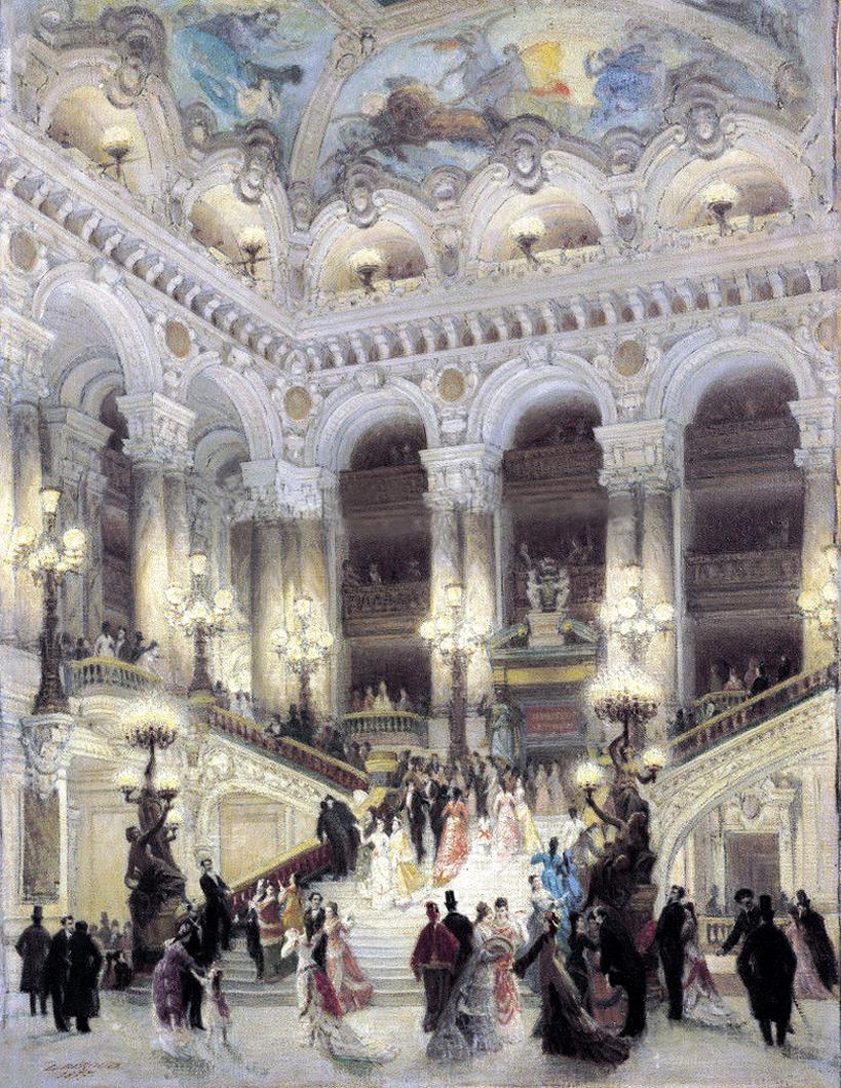
The grand stairway of the Paris Opera (1875)

Paris composers during the Belle Époque period had a major impact on European music, moving it away from Romanticism toward Impressionism in music and Modernism.

The defeat of France in the Franco-Prussian War of 1870-71 led to the downfall of Napoleon III, and the brief reign of the Paris Commune. During the two-month reign of the Commune, the Tuileries Palace was renamed the Maison du Peuple and hosted concerts of the music of Auber and Verd, while brass bands Bands of the Commune's National Guard gave concerts in the parks. The Commune produced one memorable song, Le Temps des cerises, with the melody of an 1866 song. In May 1871, as the French Army entered Paris and crushed the Commune, the Communards set fire to musical landmarks of the old regime, including the Tuileries Palace, the Théâtre-Lyrique on Place du Chatelet, and the house of Prosper Mérimée, the author of the novel Carmen and friend of Napoleon III. Despite the destruction, the opera reopened in July 1871 at rue de Pelletier with a performance of Auber's La Muette de Portici. The ruins of the Tuileries were eventual torn down, but the Théâtre-Lyrique was repaired and re-opened in November 1874, The opera house of Charles Garnier was completed and finally dedicated on January 5, 1875, in the presence of the President of the new Third Republic, Patrice de MacMahon and the King of Spain, with excerpts of music by Auber, Rossini, Halévy, Meyerbeer, and a ballet by Delibes and Minkus. Garnier appeared on the grand stairway during the intermission and received the applause of the crowd.

=== Bizet, Saint-Saëns and Debussy ===
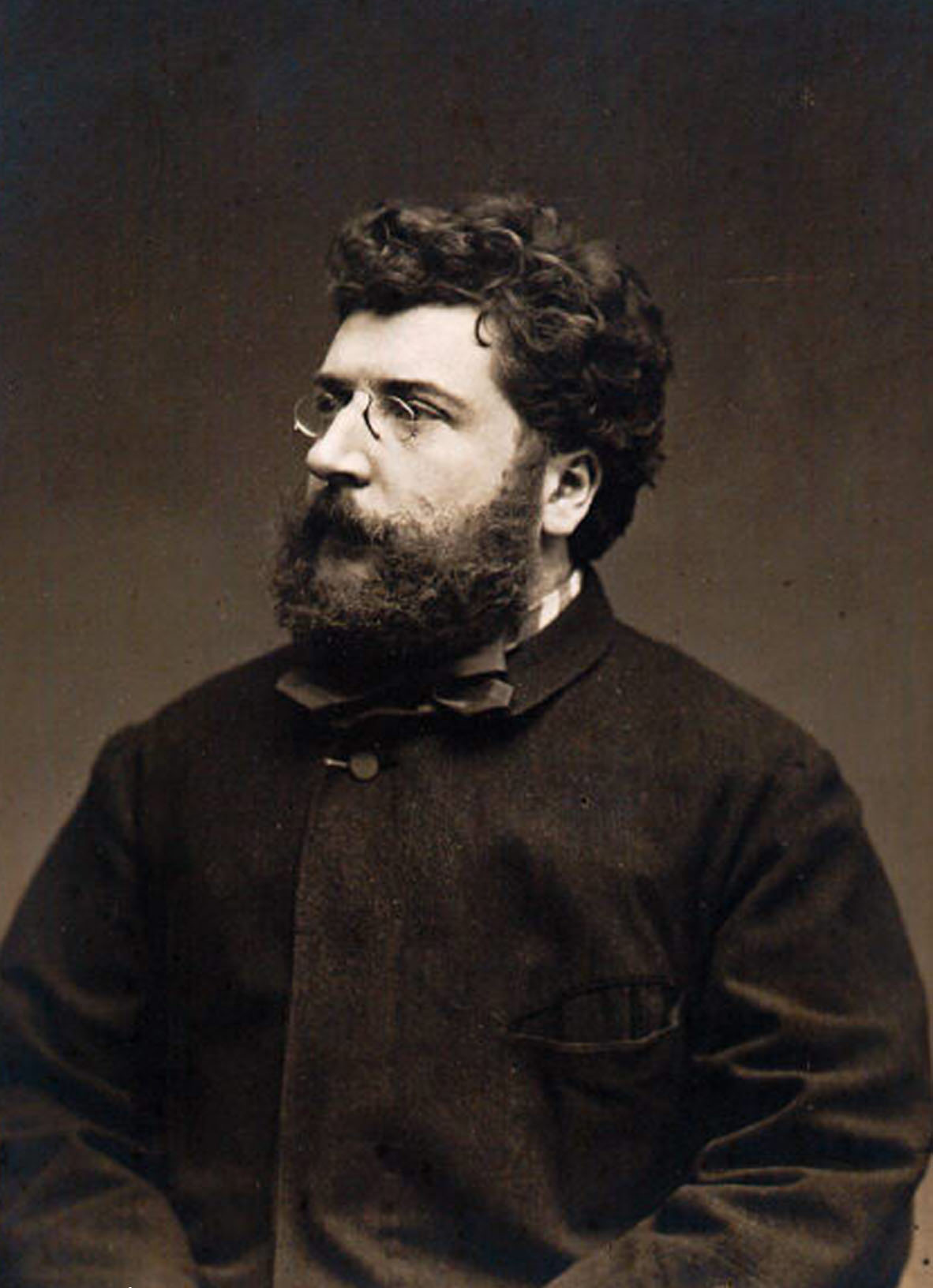
Georges Bizet (1875)

The outbreak of the war between France and Germany in 1870 caused a group of French composers to form the Société Nationale de Musique, (SNM), officially founded on February 25, 1871, to promote new French music and resist the current of German music and particularly the influence of Wagner. It was led by Camille Saint-Saëns and included César Franck and Jules Massenet. The Society held its first concert at the Salle Pleyel in the autumn of 1871. The SNM played an important part through the Belle Époque by introducing Paris audiences to the music of new French composers, including Debussy, Gabriel Fauré, and Maurice Ravel.

In addition to the SNM, Paris had three world-class symphony orchestras during the Belle Époque. In 1873 the Concert National was founded, under the direction of Édouard Colonne. It performed regularly at the Théatre du Châtelet, and premiered works by Debussy, Franck, Charles Gounod, Fauré, Massenet, and Sant-Saëns. Colonne invited leading European composers, including Richard Strauss, Edvard Grieg, and Piotr Tchaikovsky to conduct their works in Paris. He was also the first conductor of note to make commercial gramophone (phonograph) records, for the Pathé company in 1906.

A second orchestra, the Societé des nouveaux concerts, was founded by Charles Lamoureux in 1881, devoted largely to the work of Wagner and his followers. This orchestra performed the Paris premiere of Wagner's Lohengrin at the Eden Theater in 1887. The society became known as the Lamouroux orchestra. A third symphony was created in 1905 by Victor Charpantier, brother of composer Gustave Charpentier, composed of amateur musicians, which gave free concerts at the Trocadero, under the direction of composers including Charpentier, Fauré and Saint-Saëns. In 1901, Gustave Charpentier founded the first trade union of professional musicians in France. Some of the SNM musicians felt that organization was too conservative, and in 1910 they founded the Societé musicale indépendante, or SMI, to promote "new tendencies" and music from abroad. Gabriel Fauré became head of the new organization; the SMI would go on to premiere his new works, as well as works by Ravel, Manuel de Falla, and Vaughan Williams, and the first performances of works by Eric Satie before a large public.

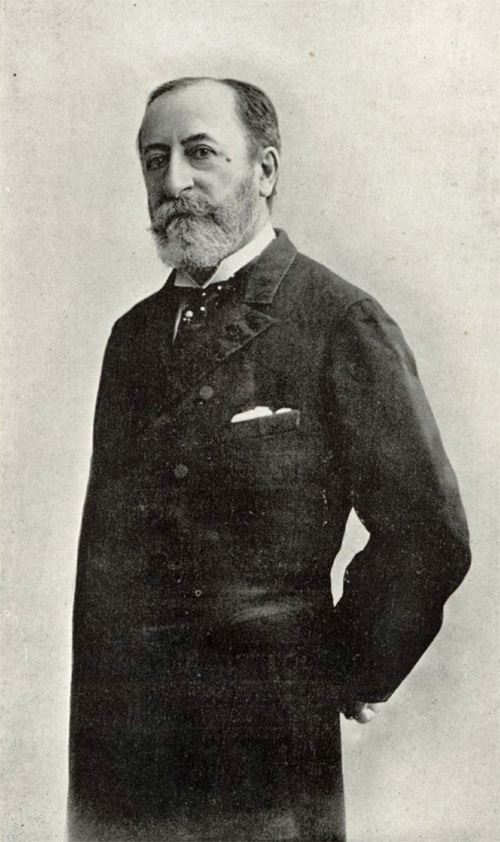
Camille Saint-Saëns (about 1880)

In July 1872 the Opéra-Comique commissioned Georges Bizet to write an opera based on the novel Carmen by Prosper Mérimée. The rehearsals for the finished opera were extremely difficult; in previous operas, the chorus simply lined up on stage and sang, but in Carmen, they were asked to walk around the stage, act, and even smoke cigarettes. It defied all conventions of comic opera, with its musical style, the profession of its heroine and its tragic ending. At its premiere on March 3, 1875, it scandalized both the critics and the audience; one critic reported it "was neither scenic nor dramatic." It was defended by Camille Saint-Saëns, who called it a masterpiece, but when Bizet died three months after the premiere, it was considered a failure. With time it became one of the most-performed works of Paris opera.

Camille Saint-Saëns (1835-1921) was born in Paris and was admitted to the Paris Conservatoire when he was thirteen. When he finished the Conservatory, he became an organist at the church of Saint-Merri, and later at La Madeleine. His opera, Samson et Dalila (1877), was in the grand romantic tradition, though the music was new and innovative. He also won fame in Paris for Danse Macabre, the opera The Carnival of the Animals (1877), and his Symphonie No. 3 "avec orgue" in C minor, op. 78 (1886). Société Nationale de Musique,

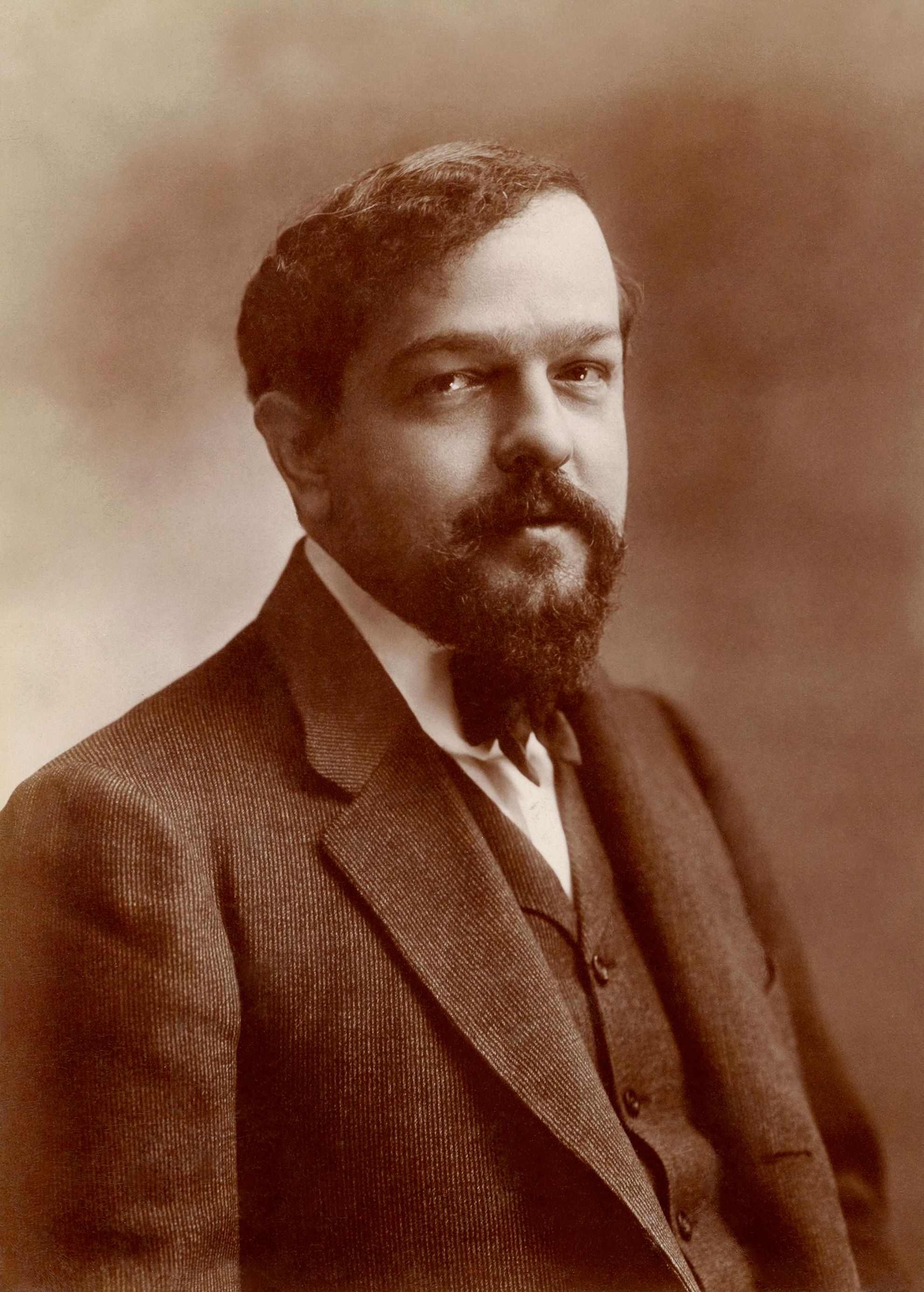
Claude Debussy, c. 1900

Claude Debussy (1862-1918) was born at Saint-Germain-en-Laye, near Paris, and entered the Conservatory in 1872. He became part of the Parisian literary circle of the symbolist poet Stéphane Mallarmé, and an admirer of Richard Wagner, then went on to experiment with impressionism in music, atonal music and chromaticism. His most famous works included Clair de Lune (1890), La Mer (1905) and the opera Pelléas et Mélisande (1903-1905). He lived at 23 square de l'Avenue-Foch in the 16th arrondissement from 1905 until his death in 1918.

Other influential composers in Paris during the period included Jules Massenet (1842-1912), author of the operas Manon and Werther; Gustave Charpentier, composer of the working-class "opera-novel" Louise; and Erik Satie (1866-1925), who, after leaving the Conservatory, made his living as a pianist at Le Chat Noir, a cabaret on Montmartre. His most famous works were the Gymnopédies (1888).

Spanish music had an important part in the music of Paris in the Belle Époque, particularly between 1907 and 1914. The prominent Spanish composers Enrique Granados, Isaac Albeniz, Joaquín Turina and Manuel de Falla all lived in Paris, were inspired by the new works French music as well as traditional Spanish themes, and created a new school of modern Spanish music. They also in turn influenced French music; Debussy and Ravel wrote Iberia and Rapsodie espagnole inspired by Spanish themes.

=== Music of the Expositions ===
The great Paris Universal Expositions of 1878, 1889 and 1900 brought the greatest musicians in the world to Paris to perform, and also introduced musical genres from around the world, including Javanese, Congolese, New Caledonian, Algerian and Vietnamese music, to Paris audiences, The 1889 Exposition offered concerts by Nikolai Rimsky-Korsakov and Alexander Glazunov, while the 1900 Exposition featured band concerts conducted by John Philip Sousa. At the 1900 Exposition, Claude Debussy conducted a grand concert of his work at the Palais de Trocadero. The 1881 Exposition of electricity featured the first transmission of the sound of a musical performance from the Paris opera house to the Palace of Industry, while the 1889 Exposition displayed the new phonograph patented by Thomas Edison, which played the latest songs by Charles Gounod.

=== The café concert, the music hall and the cabaret ===
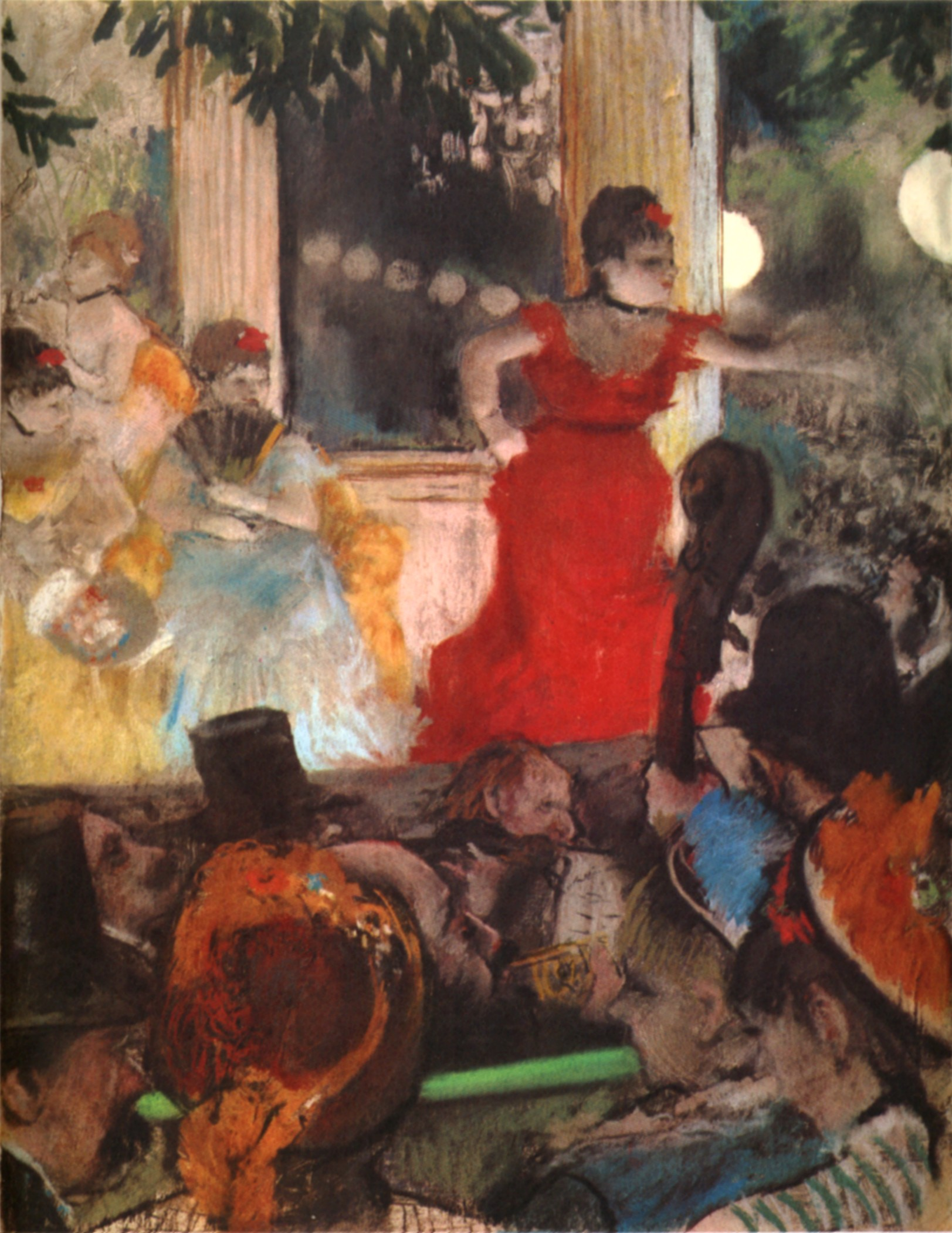
The Café-Concert by Edgar Degas (1876-77)

The café concert was an extremely popular musical venue at the beginning of the Belle Époque. Following the 1870 war, sentimental songs and songs calling for revenge against Germany for the loss of Alsace and Lorraine were the staple of all musical cafes. Over the course of the Belle Époque, the café chantant evolved into two different musical institutions; some, like the Café des Ambassadeurs and the Eldorado, became very large, crowded and filled with noise and smoke, with orchestras, dance reviews, singers and comedy.

The music hall originated in England in 1842, and was first imported into France in its British form in 1862, but under the French law protecting the state theaters, performers could not wear consumes or recite dialogue, something only allowed in theaters. When the law changed in 1867, the Paris music hall flourished, and a half-dozen new halls opened, offering acrobats, singers, dancers, magicians, and trained animals.

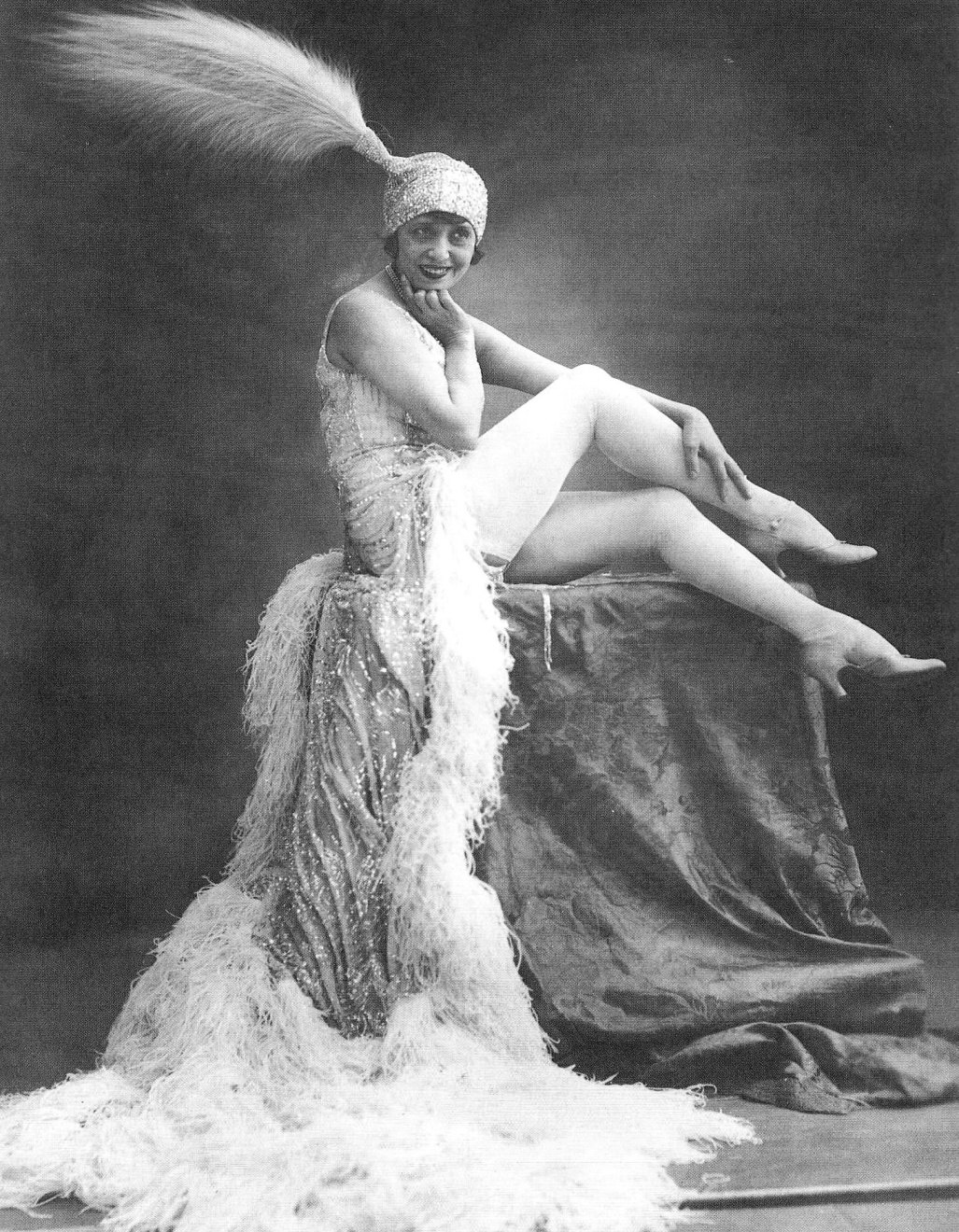
Mistinguett at the Moulin Rouge (1911)

The first Paris music hall built specially for that purpose was the Folies-Bergere (1869); it was followed by the Moulin Rouge (1889), the Alhambra (1866), the first to be called a music hall, and the Olympia (1893). The Printania (1903) was a music-garden, open only in summer, with a theater, restaurant, circus, and horse-racing. Older theaters also transformed themselves into music halls, including the Bobino Music Hall (1873), the Bataclan (1864), and the Alcazar (1858). At the beginning, music halls offered dance reviews, theater and songs, but gradually songs and singers became the main attraction. At the end of the Belle Epoque, the music halls began to face competition from movie theaters. The Olympia responded in 1911 with the invention of the grand stairway as a set for its musical and dance spectacles.

The smaller, more intimate clubs, called cabarets, focused on individual singers and personal songs, often written by the singer, along with satire and poetry. The Le Chat Noir, neighborhood of Montmartre, was created in 1881 by Rodolphe Salis, a theatrical agent and entrepreneur. It combined music and other entertainment with political commentary and satire. The Chat Noir brought together the wealthy and famous of Paris with the Bohemians and artists of Montmartre and the Pigalle. Its clientele was described by the historian Paul Bourget: "a fantastic mixture of writers and painters, of journalists and students, of employees and high-livers, as well as models, prostitutes and true grand dames searching for exotic experiences." The composer Eric Satie earned his living after finishing the Conservatory playing the piano at the Chat Noir.

By 1896 there were fifty-six cabarets and cafes with music in Paris, along with a dozen music halls. The cabarets did not have a high reputation; one critic wrote in 1897, "they sell drinks which are worth fifteen centimes along with verses which, for the most part, are worth nothing.".

=== Diaghilev, Stravinsky and the Ballets Russes ===
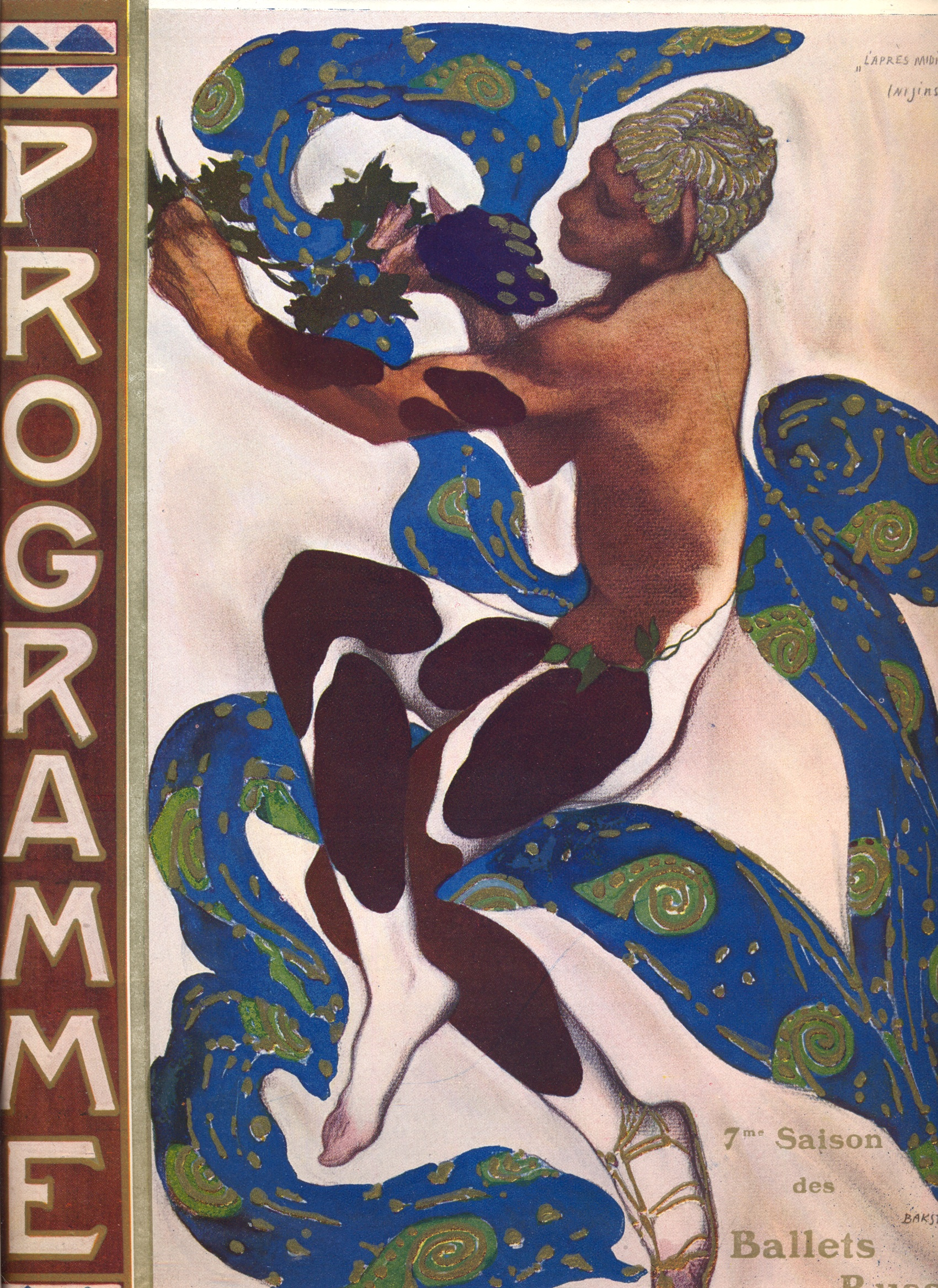
Program for Afternoon of a Fawn by the Ballets Russes (1912)

Russian music became extremely popular in Paris at the end of Belle Époque; The orchestras Lamoureux, Colonne, and the Paris Conservatory performed the music of Modest Mussorgsky, Glazunov, Mikhail Glinka, Borodin, Rimsky-Korsakov, Tchaikovsky and Scriabin and flocked to hear the singer Chaliapin. In 1907 the French impresario Gabriel Astruc organized a season of Russian music, with performances by Scriabin and Sergei Rachmaninov.

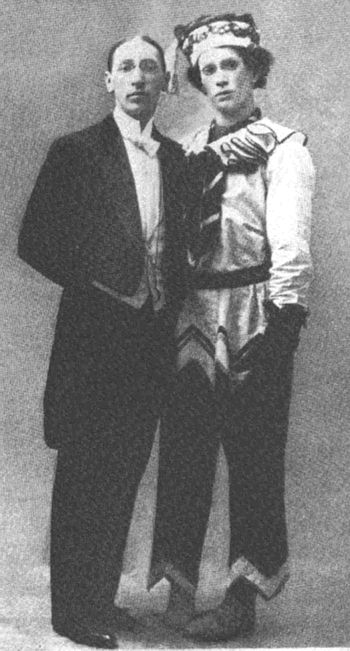
Stravinsky and Nijinsky (1911)

In 1908 the Russian impresario Sergei Diaghilev brought to Paris a production of Boris Gudonov by Mussorgsky, with Chaliapin the leading role, while the Opéra-Comique staged The Snow Maiden by Rimsky-Korsakov. In 1909 Diaghilev brought dancers from the Imperial Théater in Saint Petersburg including Vaslav Nijinsky, Anna Pavlova and Ida Rubenstein, to the Châtelet theater with a program of classical ballet. The Paris audiences loved the dancers but were not excited by the ballets, which lost money. For 1910, Diaghilev decided to do something entirely new, and commissioned Ravel to write a ballet, Daphnis and Chloë, for his new company, now called the Ballets Russes. The season made a celebrity of unknown composer, Igor Stravinsky and his ballet The Firebird. The Ballets Russes returned to Paris in 1911 with a new work of Stravinsky, Petrushka and a new version of Daphnis et Chloé with choreography by Fokine and sets by Léon Bakst. In 1912, the Ballets Russes presented Afternoon of a Fawn by Debussy, choreographed and danced by Nijinsky. Nijinsky and the ballet were denounced by the French press, which called his performance "vile, bestial and erotic", and by Debussy himself, though it was defended by many French artists, including Rodin and Odilon Redon.

The 1913 season, performed at the new Théâtre des Champs-Élysées, brought a new scandal, with The Rite of Spring, written by Stravinsky and choreographed by Nijinsky. The shouts of the audience during the performance, both for and against the dancers, were so loud that the dancers could not hear the music; the choreographer, in the wings, had to count in a loud voice to help them. The ballet transformed the way in which subsequent composers thought about rhythmic structure. The outbreak of World War I and the subsequent Russian Revolution of 1917 left the Ballets Russes stranded in Paris. They continued to perform in France and toured around Europe and the world, but never had the opportunity to perform in their own country.

=== Dance—the Bal-musette, the cakewalk, the can-can and the tango ===
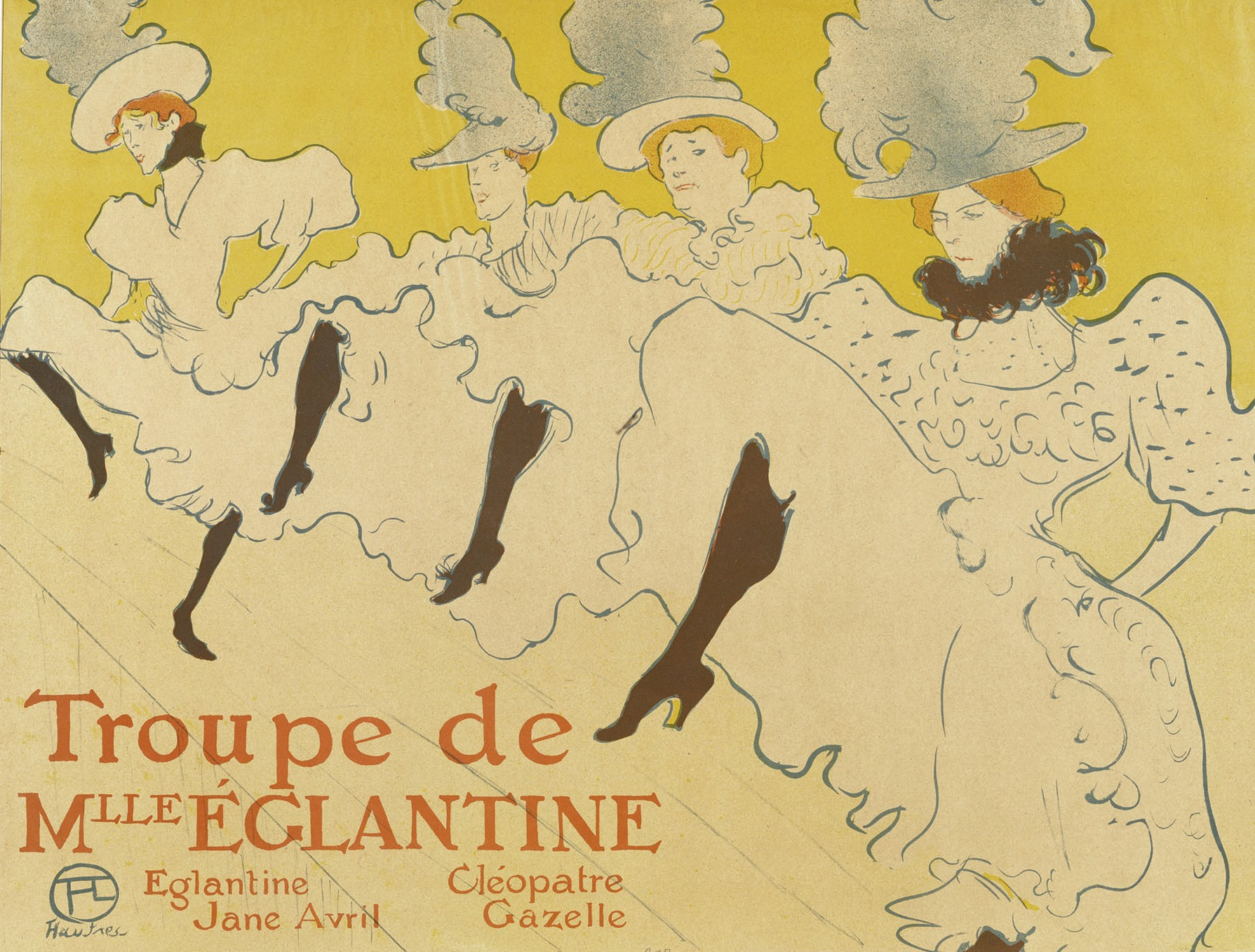
The can-can by Henri de Toulouse-Lautrec, 1895

Parisians of all social classes had a passion for dancing. The Bal-musette was a popular kind of dancing venue for working-class Parisians. It originated among the Auvergnats who came to Paris in large numbers in the 19th century. They took place at cafés and bars where patrons danced the bourrée to the accompaniment of the cabrette (a bellows-blown bagpipe locally called a "musette") and often the vielle à roue (hurdy-gurdy). Later Parisian and Italian musicians who played the accordion adopted the style. The Bal-musettes featured simple, fast and sensual dance steps, often with dancers holding each other very close; it could be danced in a small space.

The Cakewalk was introduced in Paris in 1903 by pair of American professional dancers, Professor Elk and his wife, at the Nouveau Cirque. The cakewalk was soon featured in other music halls, and was made into an early recording, with the singer Mistinguett. Claude Debussy composed a cakewalk, called Colliwog's cake-walk, between 1906 and 1908.

The Can-can originated in the 1820s, and in its original form was danced in cabarets and balls by couples at the fast pace of a galop. It was often described as immoral, because women lifted their shirts and showed their stockings. Beginning in the 1850s, it was modified into stage form, with dancers in a line facing the audience making high kicks, splits and cartwheels; a version which became known as the French can-can. The most famous accompaniment was Offenbach's The Infernal Galop from Orpheus in the Underworld (1858), though it was not written for that dance. The can-can was performed at music halls throughout the Belle Époque and remains popular today.

The tango was introduced into Paris in 1905, and was popularized by the Argentinian singer and composer Alfredo Gobb and his wife, singer Flora Rodiriguez, who came to Paris in 1907. They became professional tango teachers, and made numerous recordings of their music. It became popular throughout Paris; in 1913, even the President of France, Raymond Poincaré, danced a few steps of a tango at an official ball.

=== Links to music of the Belle Époque ===
- Le Temps des cerises (Music 1866, words 1871)
- Maria Callas sing the Habanera from the opera Carmen, by Georges Bizet
- Traditional Bal-Musette music
- Debussy playing Golliwog's Cakewalk
- Excerpt of Stravinsky's ballet Rites of Spring (1913)

== The Années Folles (1919–1939) ==
Costume by Picasso for the cubist ballet Parade, with music by Eric Satie (1917)

The first World War disrupted the Paris musical world; many musicians went into the army, and Ravel, too short to serve in the army, became a volunteer ambulance driver; but it did not stop musical creation altogether. The first cubist musical work, Parade, with a text by Jean Cocteau, music by Eric Satie, decor by Pablo Picasso, and choreography by Massine, was presented at the Chatelet theater on May 18, 1917. The poet and critic Apollinaire coined a new word, sur-realism, to describe it. The music by Satie featured an unusual mixture of instruments, including a saxophone, a harp, xylophone, a bouteillophone of bottles filled with varying amounts of water, and various noise-making devices, including a typewriter, siren, and a revolver. The production was denounced by one Paris newspaper as "the demolition of our national values" but Stravinsky praised it for its opposition to the "waves of impressionism, with language that is firm, clear, and without any connection with images."

=== Classical music—Ravel, Satie and Stravinsky ===
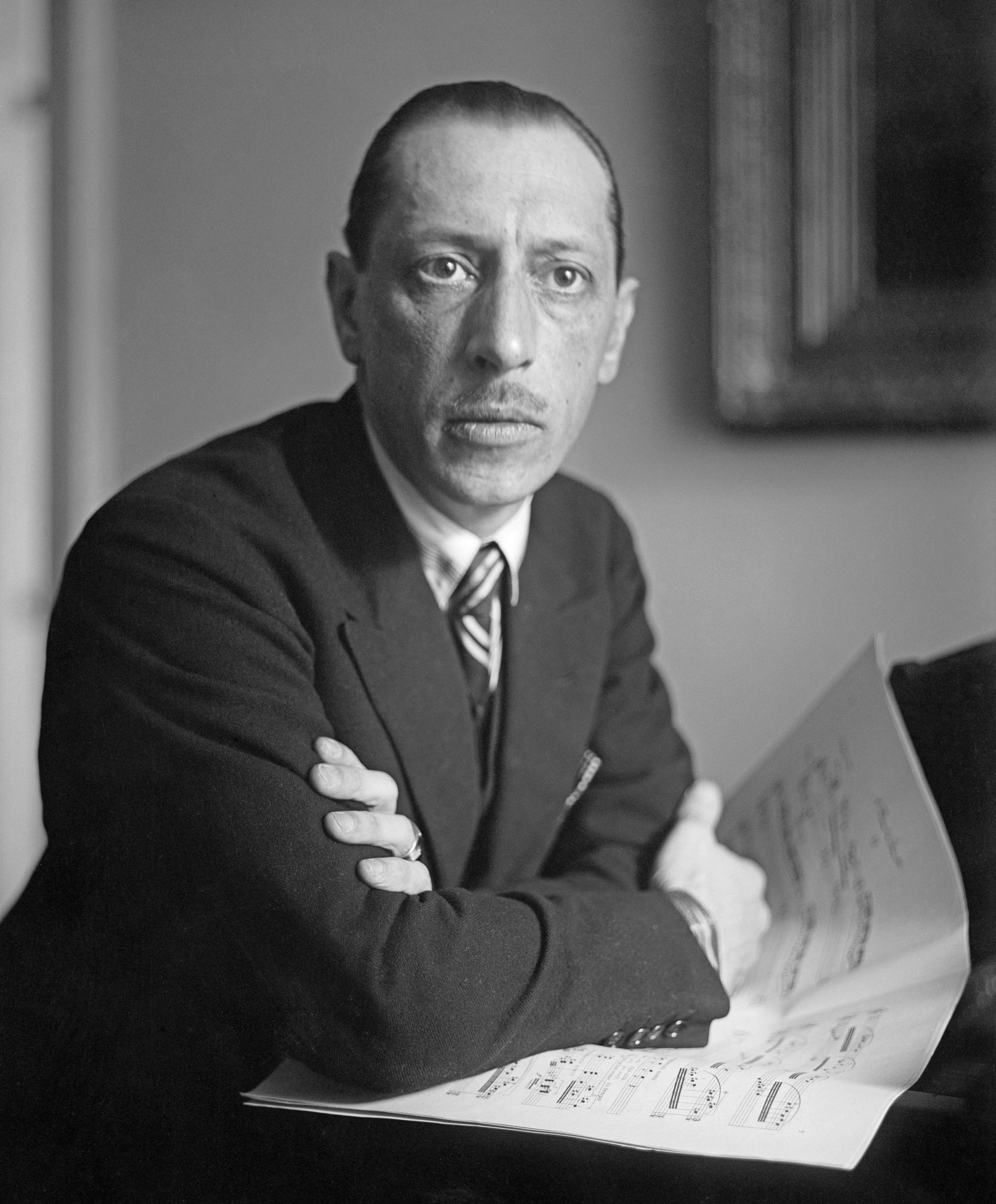
Igor Stravinsky

Many prominent composers worked in Paris during between the wars, including Maurice Ravel, Erik Satie, and Igor Stravinsky. Ravel was born in 1875; one of his last works, Boléro, written in 1928, became his most famous and most-often performed work. It was written on a commission from the Russian dancer Ida Rubinstein, who had been a member of the Ballets Russes before starting her own company. The composition was a sensational success when it was premiered at the Paris Opéra on November 22, 1928, with choreography by Bronislava Nijinska and designs by Alexandre Benois. Satie (1866-1925) was in poor health, due largely to a long life of excessive drinking. Nonetheless, he established connections with the Dadaist movement, and wrote the music for two ballets shortly before his death.

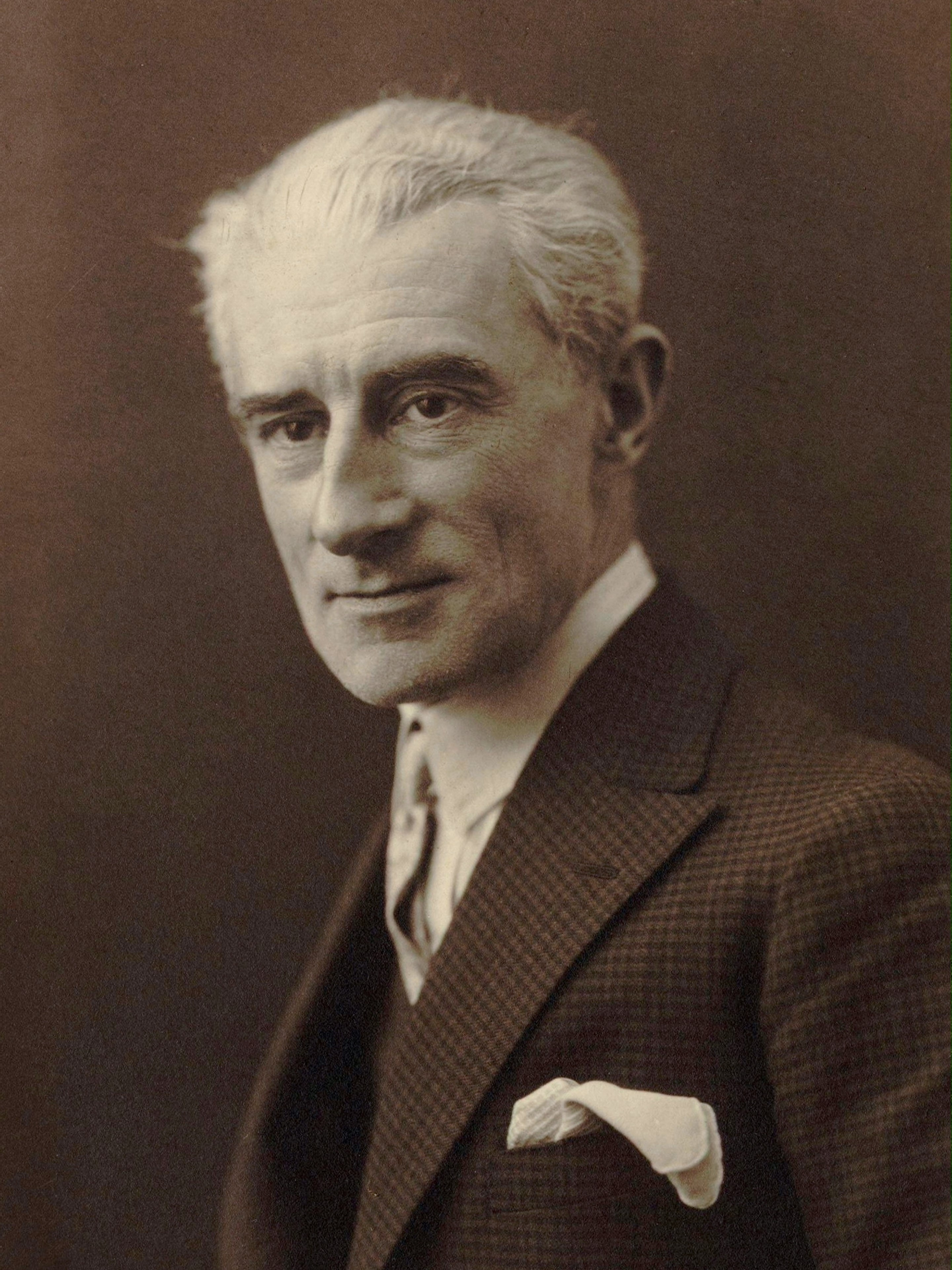
Maurice Ravel (1925)

Igor Stravinsky (1888-1971) first achieved fame in Paris just before World War I with his revolutionary compositions for the Ballets Russes. In 1920 he returned for a production of a new ballet, Pulcinella, with sets designed by Pablo Picasso. He, his wife and daughter were invited by designer Coco Chanel to stay in her new house in the Paris suburb of Garches. Struggling for money, he obtained a contract with the Paris piano company Pleyel et Cie to re-arrange his music for their popular player pianos. In February 1921 he met the Russian dancer Vera de Bosset and began a long affair with her, both in Paris and on tours around Europe. He became a French citizen in 1931 and moved into a house on the rue de Faubourg-Saint-Honoré. It was a very unhappy period for him; both his daughter and wife died of tuberculosis. In 1939, as World War II approached, he left Paris for the United States; he married Vera in 1940 and settled in Los Angeles.

New musical movements flourished in Paris. The most famous was Les Six, a group of six young French composers; brought together by Jean Cocteau and Eric Satie. They were Georges Auric, Louis Durey, Arthur Honegger, Darius Milhaud, Francis Poulenc and Germaine Tailleferre, all born between 1888 and 1899. Their music had no common style; they were united mainly in opposition to the dramatic style of Wagner and the impressionistic style of Debussy and Ravel. They provided music for many colorful theatrical pieces written by Cocteau for the Paris stage.

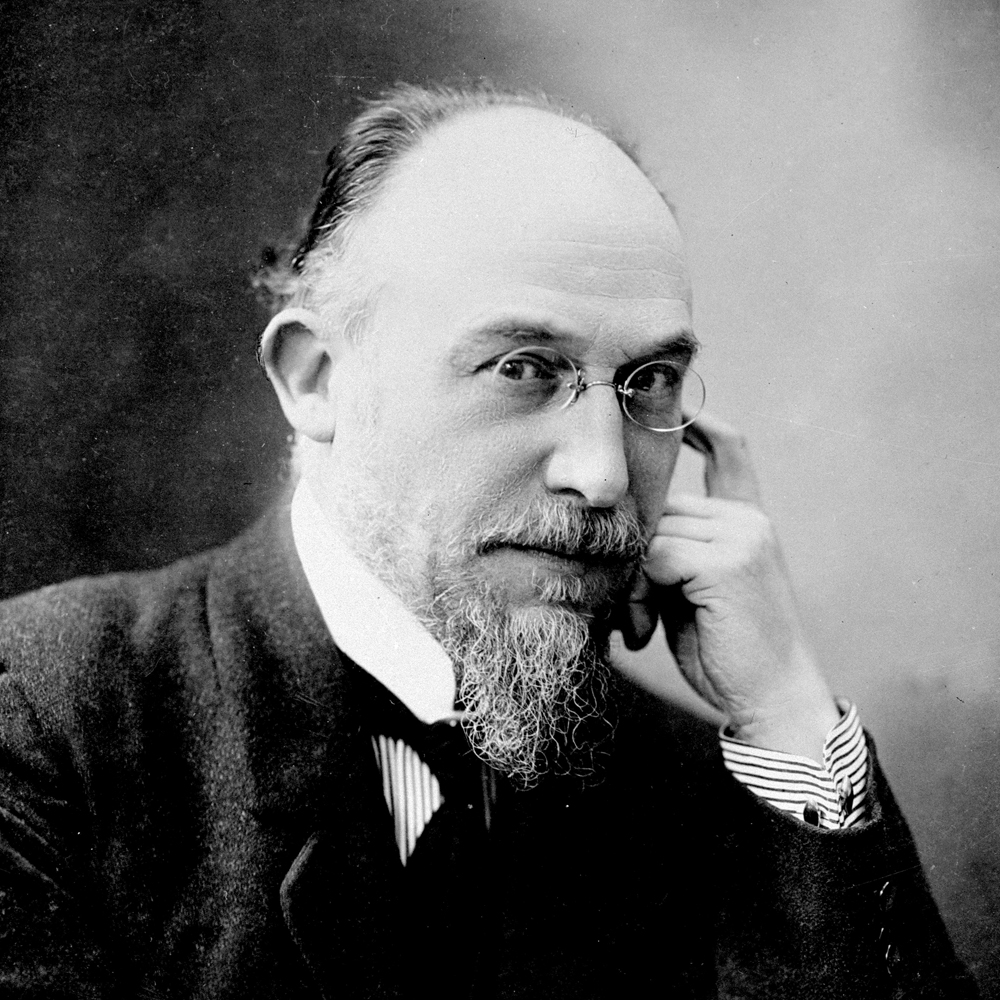
Eric Satie

Between the wars, Paris was home to a remarkable colony of foreign composers, including Aaron Copland from the United States (from 1920 to 1925), Heitor Villa-Lobos from Brazil (1923-1930); and Béla Bartók from Hungary (after 1922). The American composer George Gershwin came to Paris in 1926 and 1928 and tried (without success) to have composition lessons with Ravel and Nadia Boulanger. During his 1928 visit, while staying at the Majestic Hotel, he wrote a symphonic poem, An American in Paris, which, at one point, turned into music the sound of Paris taxi horns on the nearby Etoile.

A new three-thousand seat concert hall, the Salle Pleyel, was built in Paris in the interwar period. It was commissioned in 1927 by piano manufacturer Pleyel et Cie and designed by Gustave Lion. The inauguration concert was performed by the Orchestre de la Société des Concerts du Conservatoire, with Robert Casadesus as soloist and Igor Stravinsky, Maurice Ravel, and Philippe Gaubert as conductors, A fire ravaged the interior of the hall on 28 June 1928, and it was extensively renovated, and the number of seats reduced to 1,913.

=== Dance—the Ballets Russes and Ida Rubinstein ===
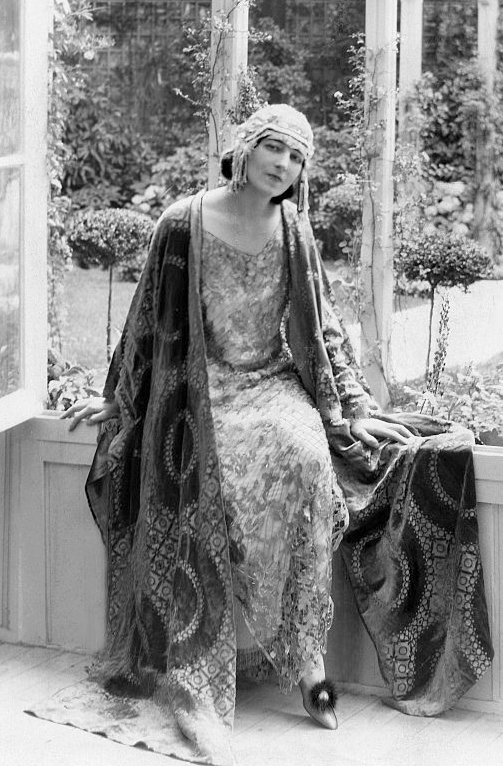
Ida Rubinstein, for whom Boléro was written (1922 photo)

The most famous Paris dance company was the Ballets Russes, Founded by Sergei Diaghilev in 1909. The company performed in Paris and internationally until Diaghilev's death in 1929. The set designers included Pablo Picasso, Henri Matisse, Georges Braque, Joan Miró, and Salvador Dalí. Its choreographers included Bronislava Nijinska (1891-1972), the younger sister of the star dancer Vaslav Nijinsky, and a young George Balanchine (1904-1983). In 1924, Balanchine, then a dancer, fled a Soviet dance company on tour in the Weimar Republic and came to Paris, where Diaghilev hired him as a choreographer. The most famous production was the 1924 ballet Le Train Bleu with a story by Cocteau, music by Darius Milhaud, costumes by Coco Chanel and a curtain painted by Picasso.

The dancer Ida Rubinstein left the Ballets Russes in 1911 and started her own troupe, commissioning famous poets, including André Gide and Paul Valéry, and composers, including Stravinsky and Honneger, to write ballets for her. Her most famous creation was Boléro, written for her by Ravel, which she first danced at the Paris Opera on November 22, 1928. Ravel originally called the music Fandango, since it much more closely resembled that dance rather than a true bolero.

In 1920 a new ballet company, directed by Swedish choreographer and dancer Jean Börlin, was established at the Théâtre des Champs-Élysées, and then performed in a more intimate new hall, the Studio des Champs-Élysées. Like the Ballets Rousses, Börlin also commissioned famous artists, including Pierre Bonnard and Fernand Léger to create the decor, famous poets including Paul Claudel to write the texts, and avant-garde musicians, including Ravel, Satie and members of the Group of Six, including Taillefere, Milhaud Honnege to write the music.

=== The arrival of jazz—the Hot Club de Paris ===
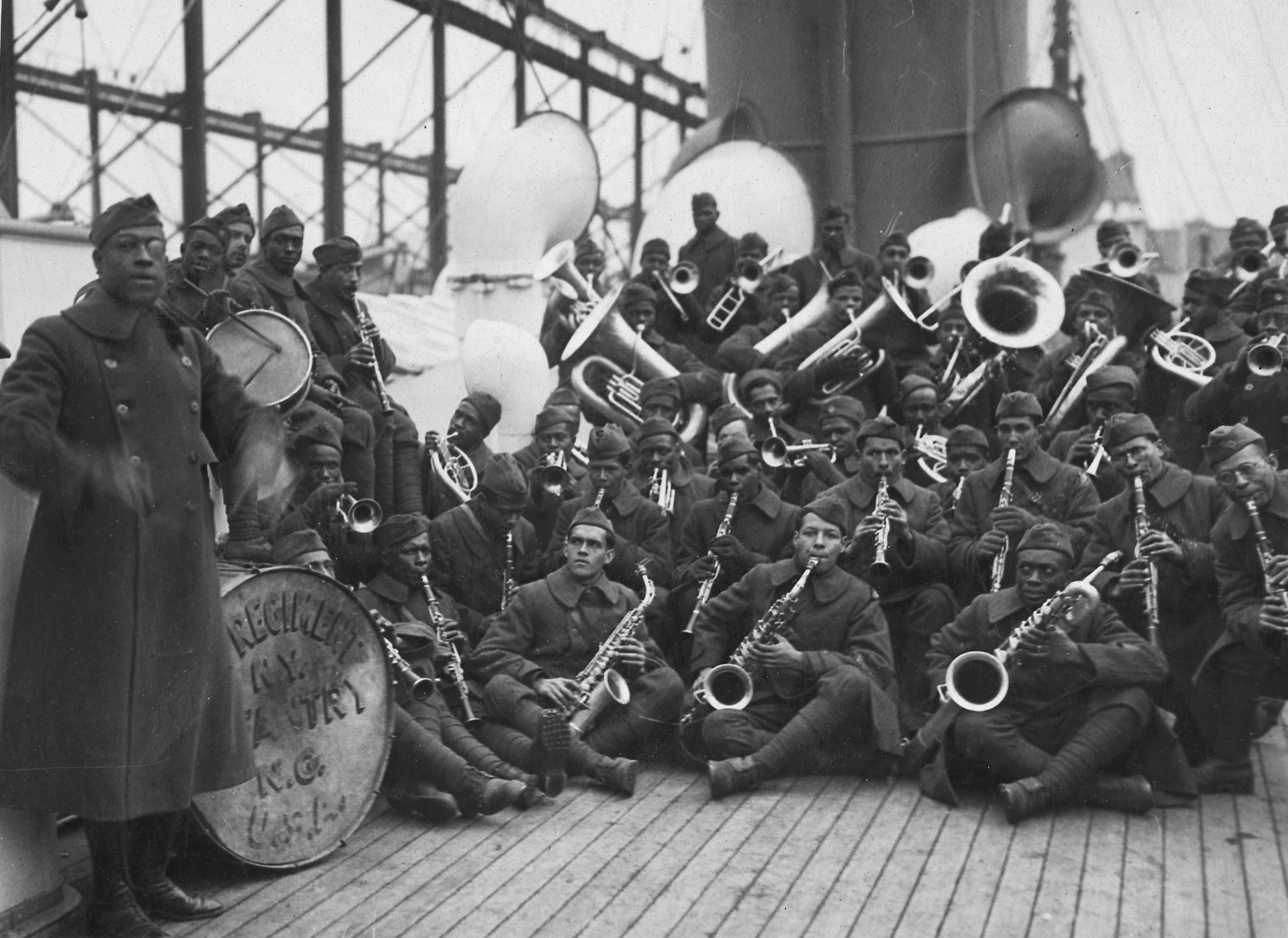
The U.S. Army band conducted by James Reese Europe en route to France (1917)

Jazz came to Paris in 1917, with the American soldiers arriving to fight in the First World War. The soldiers were accompanied by military bands, including the 369th regiment band, composed of fifty black musicians directed by a celebrated Broadway band leader, James Reese Europe, and several other regimental bands led by famous American musicians. They gave concerts at the kiosks in the parks of Paris, performing the foxtrot, the two-step, the one-step, and the Memphis Blues and "The Army Blues" of W.C. Handy.

In August 1918, the orchestra of J.R. Europe was invited to perform at a music hall on the Champs-Élysées. The one-night performance was extended for eight weeks. The Casino de Paris presented the first French jazz review, with Gaby Deslys and Harry Pilcer and a ragtime orchestra. A black American jazz orchestra, the Jazz Kings, led by drummer Louis Mitchell, came to the Casino de Paris in 1919 to present a jazz review called Pa-ri-ki-ri, followed in 1920 by the jazz review Laisse-les-Tomber, with the young singer Mistinguett. The author jean Cocteau, enchanted by the new sound, described jazz as "an improvised catastrophe" and "a sonic cataclysm".

By 1930, Parisians were listening to recordings of American jazz; Duke Ellington brought his orchestra to Paris in 1932, Louis Armstrong and Cab Calloway in 1934, Bill Coleman, Coleman Hawkins and Benny Carter in 1935. The first famous Paris jazz club, the Hot Club de Paris, was founded in 1932. The first famous French jazz group, the Quintette du Hot Club de France, was formed in 1934; its members were Django Reinhardt, his brother Joseph, Stephane Grapelli, Louis Vola and Roger Chaput. They became the most famous jazz ensemble in France, touring Europe and eventually to the United States.

=== The music hall—Mistinguett and Josephine Baker ===
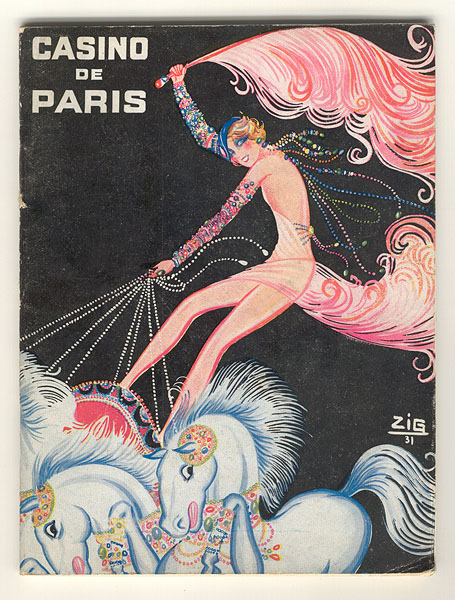
Poster for Mistinguett at the Casino de Paris (1931)

The singer Mistinguett made her debut the Casino de Paris in 1895 and continued to appear regularly in the 1920s and 1930s at the Folies Bergère, Moulin Rouge and Eldorado. Her risqué routines captivated Paris, and she became one of the most highly-paid and popular French entertainers of her time.

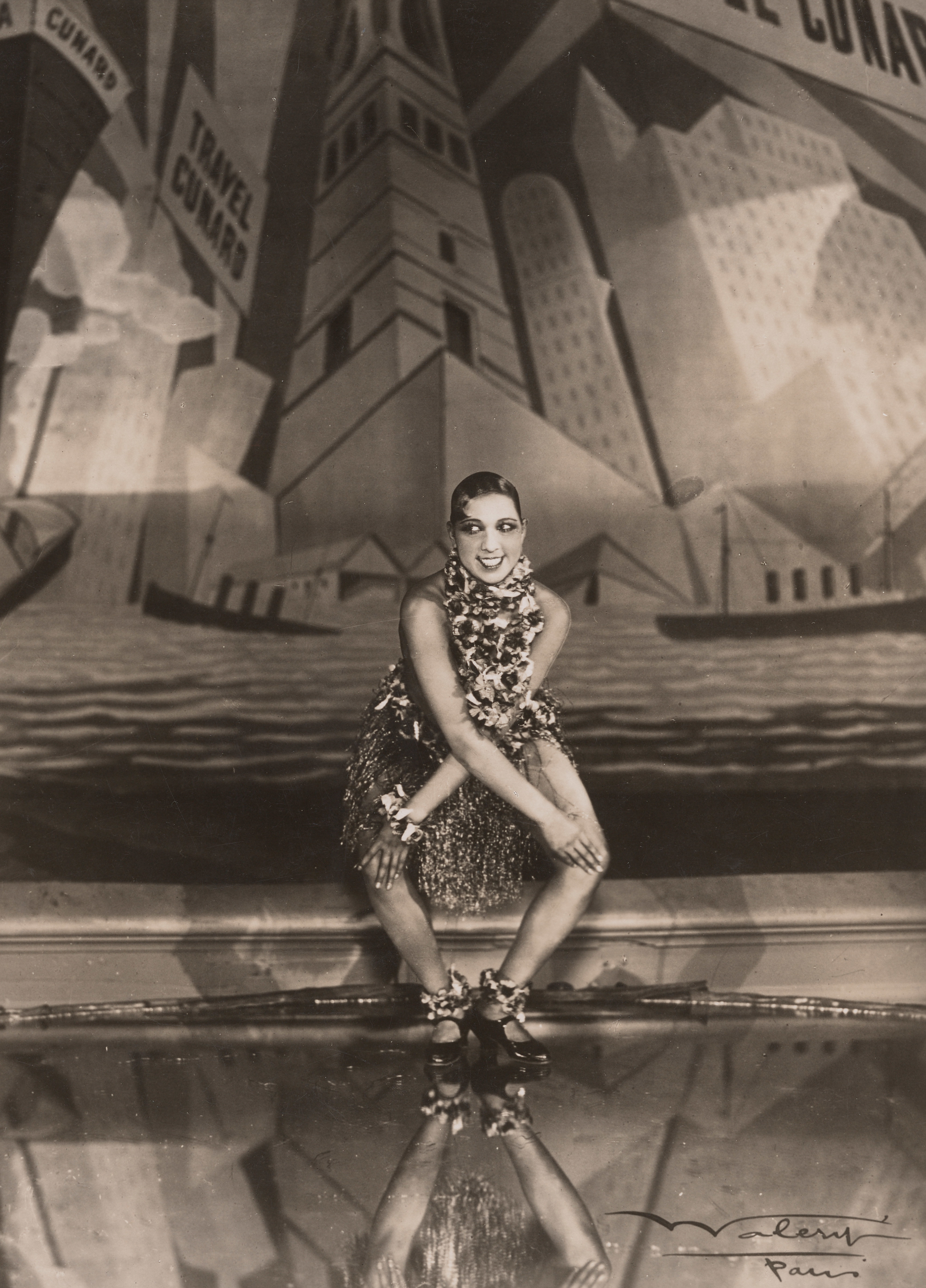
Josephine Baker dancing the Charleston, in the silent film La Folie du jour (1927), one of the acts in the revue of the same name at the Folies Bergère

The Swedish ballet performing at the Théâtre des Champs-Élysées closed in 1925, and its manager, André Davin, decided to create a musical show in the American style. He dispatched an American producer, Caroline Dudley, to New York, to recruit a company. She went to Harlem and returned in September 1925 with a troupe of twenty-five black musicians, singers and dancers, including the pianist Claude Hopkins, the clarinetist Sidney Bechet and the nineteen year old singer Josephine Baker. The new show was called La Revue nègre. The director, Jacques Charles, recruited from the Moulin Rouge, persuaded Baker to perform a dance called 'Danse sauvage', half-nude, wearing only feathers. The audience at opening night on October 2, 1925, included Jean Cocteau, composers Darius Milhaud and Maurice Ravel, and fashion designer Paul Poiret. The show was an immense success. After a successful tour of Europe, Baker returned to France three months later to star at the Folies Bergère. The Théâtre des Champs Élysées continued its American series in July 1926 with the first French performance of George Gershwin's Rhapsody in Blue by the Paul Whiteman Orchestra. The other music halls, including the Casino de Paris, Moulin Rouge and les Ambassadeurs presented jazz reviews, while the main concert halls, Pleyel and Gaveau, offered symphonic jazz concerts. New cabarets featuring jazz, including Bricktop's, the Boeuf sur le toit and Grand Écart opened, and American dance-styles, including the one-step, the fox-trot, the boston and the charleston, became popular in the dance halls.

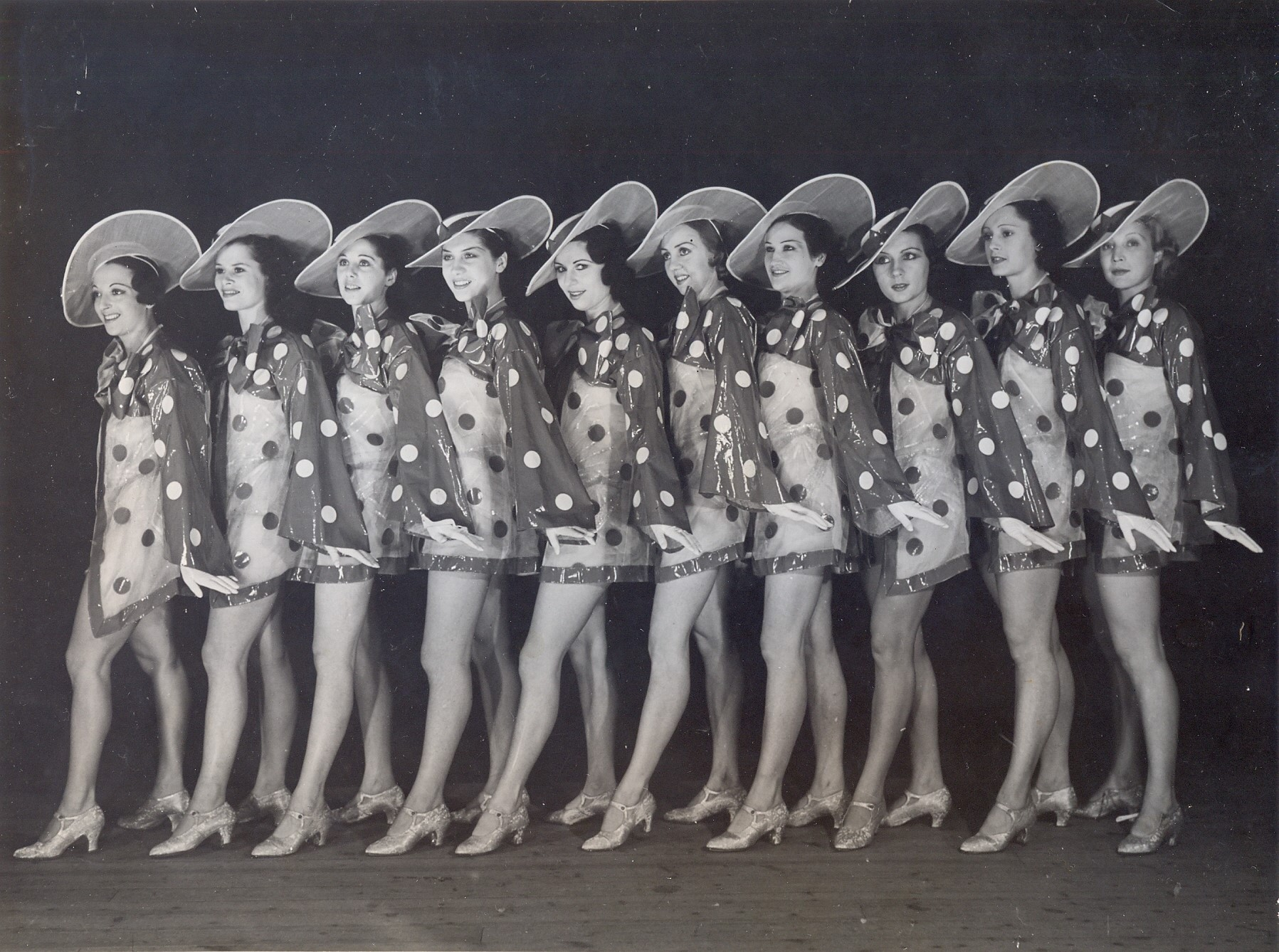
Chorus of the Folies Bergère (1934)

The music-halls suffered growing hardships in the 1930s, facing growing competition from movie theaters The Olympia was converted into a movie theater, and others closed. But others continued to thrive; In 1937 and 1930 the Casino de Paris presented shows with Maurice Chevalier, who had already achieved success as an actor and singer in Hollywood.

One genre remained highly popular in Paris; the Chanson réaliste; dramatic, emotional, tragic songs about love and passion. The leading singers of the genre were Yvonne George, Marie-Louise Damien and Fréhel. 1935, a twenty-year old singer named Édith Piaf was discovered in the Pigalle by nightclub owner Louis Leplée, whose club Le Gerny, off the Champs-Élysées, was frequented by the upper and lower classes alike. He persuaded her to sing despite her extreme nervousness. Leplée taught her the basics of stage presence and told her to wear a black dress, which became her trademark apparel. Leplée ran an intense publicity campaign leading up to her opening night, attracting the presence of many celebrities, including Maurice Chevalier. Her nightclub appearance led to her first two records produced that same year, and the beginning of a legendary career that continued into the 1960s.

=== The radio, phonograph, and the musical film ===
The arrival of radio and the musical film had a gradual but dramatic impact on Paris music. The first radio station in Paris, Radio Tour Eiffel, broadcast from the Eiffel Tower starting on December 24, 1921. The first classical music concert broadcast on French radio, was transmitted by the station Radiola on November 6, 1922, beginning with a march composed by Christoph Gluck, followed by symphonic and opera works. In 1929, a weekly series of broadcasts of classical music for school students was launched, but it had limited success. Due to the financial crisis, very few Paris schools had money to buy radios. At the beginning of Les Années Folles, the French company Pathé had a monopoly on the sale of phonograph records in France, and kept out records by other artists. In 1925, the Pathé label was bought by the American company Columbia, and soon American disks began to appear in the French market. After 1926, Parisians could buy records made by other foreign companies.

The motion picture had the greatest impact on Paris music. Due largely to competition from the movies, between 1910 and 1920 two-thirds of the Paris music halls were transformed into movie theaters. Collaboration between the Paris movie studios and the film industry had begun early. The composer Camille Saint-Saëns had written music to accompany the 1908 film L'Assassinat du duc de Guise. The composer Arthur Honegger composed music for two of the most important silent films of Abel Gance, La Roue and Napoleon. Napoleon had its grand premiere on April 7, 1927, at the Palais Garnier with a full orchestra playing the score.

The arrival in France of the first sound film, The Jazz Singer in 1927 caused a revolution in the French movie business, and was quickly followed by the production of French film musicals at the studios just outside Paris. New French films featured the singing talents of Jean Gabin (Pépé le Moko, Cœur de lilas), and Danielle Darrieux (La crise est finis, Mon cœur t'appelle, Un mauves garçon), Maurice Chevalier et Claudette Colbert (La Chanson de Paris) both made successful careers in Hollywood; Colbert remained in the U.S., but Chevalier returned to Paris and continued his singing career on the Paris music hall stage. Music hall singers, including Fernandel, Frehel and Josephine Baker, began making musical films. The 1934 musical film Zouzou, with Jean Gabin and Josephine Baker, was the first film to star a black actress. The French music industry was born, as movie studios merged with record companies and used films to promote records. The route to success for Paris singers became the recording and film.

== World War II—occupation and liberation ==
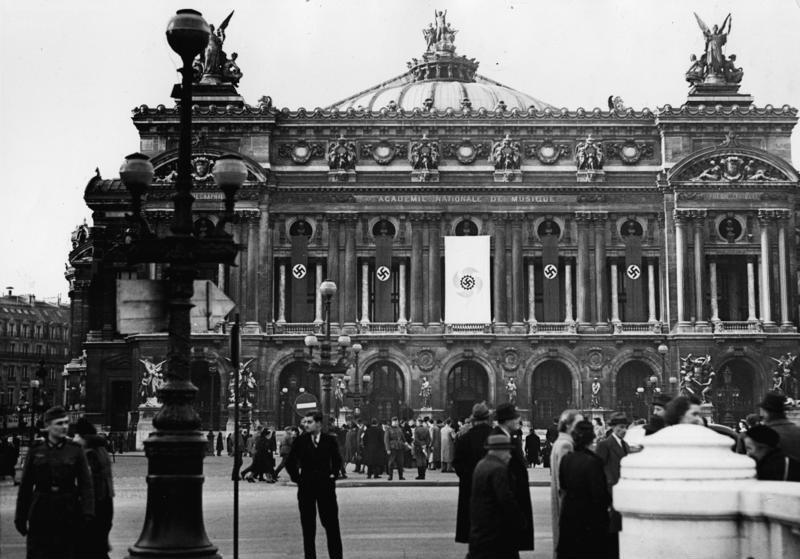
The Paris Opera decorated with swastikas for a festival of German music, 1941 (Bundesarchiv)

In 1939, in the early days of World War II, the music hall orchestra of Ray Ventura had a popular hit with the song We'll hang out our laundry on the Siegried Line, but many musicians and composers living in Paris, including Stravinsky, Darius Milhaud and Kurt Weil, departed Paris for the United States. The German army crossed the Meuse, and by the end of June occupied Paris. The repression of Jews in the musical world of Paris began; Jewish faculty were dismissed from the Conservatory; Jewish students were banned in 1942. The director of the orchestra of the Conservatory, Roger Désormière, helped organize an underground organization of French musicians, with a clandestine newspaper. The new director of the Conservatory, Claude Delvincourt, organized and clandestine music lessons for Jewish pupils. He also organized a student orchestra, and protected the male musicians from being sent to forced labor in Germany by promising to organize concerts for the German soldiers in Paris.

The four major symphony orchestras of Paris (Pasdeloupe, Colonne, Lamoureux and the Conservatory Concert Orchestra) continued to perform, giving 650 concerts during the four seasons of the Occupation. The Colonne orchestra, named for the composer Édourard Lamoureux, was forced to change its name. The Germans also organized a series of thirty-one concerts in Paris by the Berlin Philharmonic, conducted by Herbert von Karajan, and other German orchestras. French composers and musicians, including Martin Honegger, were invited to participate in music festivals in Vienna and Salzburg. The pianist Alfred Cortot became the Commissioner of Fine Arts of the Vichy government, took part in the Berlin music festival, and made a tour of German cities.

French music hall performers continued to perform to audiences of Parisians and German soldiers. The Germans organized a tour to Germany of several the most popular singers, including Maurice Chevalier, Édith Piaf, and Charles Trenet; they performed for French workers who had been forced to work in German factories.

Radio Paris became an important vehicle for Nazi and Vichy propaganda; it had an orchestra of ninety musicians and gave free concerts at the Théâtre des Champs-Élysées, which featured everything from Beethoven to Tangos and jazz. Jazz was officially banned in Germany as "decadent", and American records were banned after but remained highly popular in occupied Paris. Charles Delaunay organized a jazz festival in Paris in December 1940, and two concerts month were given at the Gaveau, and continued through 1944. Delaunay's band, called Jazz de Paris, gave a concert at the Salle Pleyel on January 16, 1941. The singer Johnny Hess also had an enormous success with his 1940 jazz-swing song, ils sont Zazous.

American jazz returned to Paris with the U.S. army on August 25, 1944. The program director of the Voice of America, Sim Copans, equipped a truck with loudspeakers and broadcast excerpts of Gershwin and other American musicians in the Paris streets. The VOA also distributed V-disks, phonograph records with the songs of Bing Crosby, Frank Sinatra, Louis Armstrong, Count Basie, Lionel Hampton and Cab Calloway. These were the first American records to arrive in Paris since the war began.

Just a month after the liberation of Paris, the first of a series of concerts was performed by the Orchestre national at the Théâtre des Champs-Élysées, presenting pieces by composers whose work was banned from public performance during the Occupation, including Gustave Mahler, Prokofiev, Stravinsky, Hindemith and Bartók. In May 1945, a Committee of National Cleansing was created for the artistic professions, to investigate musicians accused of collaborating with the Germans. Honegger was censured for touring in Germany, Mistinguett for singing on Radio-Paris. The pianist Alfred Cortot was stripped of his professorship at the Conservatory and moved back to his native Switzerland, but returned to Paris with a triumphant concert at the Salle Pleyel in 1949.

== Post-war Paris (1946–2000) ==
=== Jazz clubs of Saint-Germain-des-Pres ===
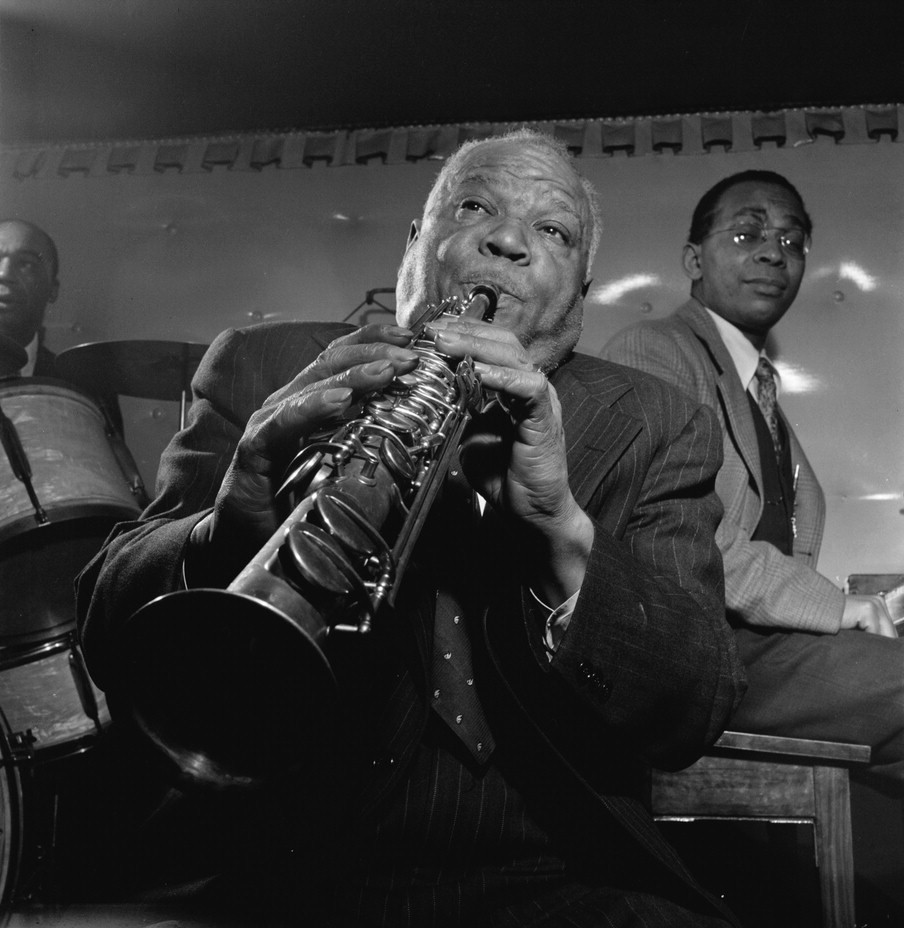
Jazz musician Sidney Bechet in 1947

In the early post-war period, immediately after World War II, the Saint-Germain-des-Pres neighborhood and the nearby Saint-Michel neighborhood became home to many small jazz clubs. They were mostly located in cellars, due to the shortage of any suitable space, and because the music at late hours was less likely to disturb the neighbors. The first to open in 1945 was the Caveau des Lorientais, near Boulevard Saint-Michel, which introduced Parisians to New Orleans Jazz, played by clarinetist Claude Luter and his band. It closed shortly afterward, but was soon followed by other cellars; Le Vieux-Columbier, the Rose Rouge, the Club Saint-Germain; and Le Tabou. The clubs attracted students from the nearby university, the Paris intellectual community, and celebrities from the Paris cultural world. They soon had doormen who controlled who was important or famous enough to be allowed inside into the cramped, smoke-filled cellars. A few of the musicians went on to celebrated careers; Sidney Bechet was the star of the first jazz festival held at the Salle Pleyel in 1949, and headlined at the Olympia music hall in 1955.

A concert by Dizzy Gillespie and his orchestra at the Salle Pleyel in 1948 introduced Paris to a new variety of jazz, called bebop, and soon the jazz world of Paris was divided into two rival camps, those for bebop and those for more traditional New Orleans jazz, in the style of Louis Armstrong; this group was led by Sidney Bechet and trumpet player Boris Vian; Mezz Mezzrow, André Rewellotty, and guitarist Henri Salvador.

Beginning in 1958, the leading figures in American jazz, including Miles Davis, Duke Ellington, Thelonious Monk and John Coltrane came to Paris to perform in a series called Paris Jazz Concert, at the Olympia music hall. The musician/composer Quincy Jones came to Paris both to perform and to study composition with Nadia Boulanger and Olivier Messiaen. Jazz also played an important part in the French New Wave films of the 1950s; the film Les Liaisons dangereuses of Roger Vadim, set in Paris in the 1960s. featured music by Thelonious Monk and Art Blakey; À bout de soufflé (Breathless) by Jean-Luc Godard had a jazz score music by Martial Solal. Most of the clubs closed by the early 1960s, as musical tastes shifted toward rock and roll.

=== Rock and roll ===
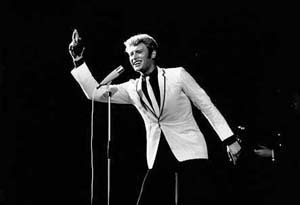
Johnny Hallyday in 1965

Rock and roll made its first appearance in Paris in 1956, when pianist and arranger Michel Legrand returned from the United States with American rock and roll records and, with Boris Vian and Henri Salvador, recorded the first French rock and roll records Rock coquet and Rock n'roll mops. In 1957 Legrand and Albert Raisner recorded a French version of Bill Haley's Rock around the Clock and Eddy Constantine recorded Rock! Rock!. At about the same time, the Golf Druout, an indoor miniature golf course at the corner of rue Drouout and boulevard Montmartre installed the first jukebox in Paris, supplied with records from an American military base. The juke box attracted crowds of listeners, and became the first rock-and-roll club in Paris. Among the young musicians who came to the Golf Druout to hear new sound was Jean-Philippe Met, who had changed his name to Johnny Hallyday and became the most enduring Parisian rock singer. The first Parisian rock band, the Five Rocks, was founded at the beginning of the 1960s; it soon changed its name to the Chausettes Noirs (the black socks) The lead singer of the Chausettes noirs, Eddy Mitchell, became famous singing Eddie sois bon, a French remake of Johnny be Good by Chuck Berry. He left the band in 1962 and became a popular film actor. In 1965, the Beatles gave two hugely successful concerts at the Palais des Sports. Rock was firmly installed as the preferred music of young Parisians.

Popular music took a big step forward in 1981 when the government gave up its monopoly over radio stations. Two hundred new private radio stations appeared in Paris alone, the great majority devoted entirely to music, covering every genre, including classical, jazz, world music, French songs from the 1920s to 1960s, and every type of rock and roll.

=== Music from the Maghreb, Africa and the Caribbean ===
During the first part of the 20th century, the music from France's colonies in North Africa, sub-Saharan Africa and the Caribbean was largely ignored; or, during the 1900 Universal Exposition and the Paris Colonial Exposition of 1931. it was treated as an exotic novelty, performed by costumed singers and dancers for the benefit of Exposition visitors. That began to change after World War II, when large numbers of temporary workers and students came to live, work and study in Paris. In the 1960s the migration grew even larger, as the colonies were granted their independence. The migrants settled in the outer neighborhoods and suburbs and brought their music with them. The music was almost entirely ignored by the French television and radio stations until 1981 when private radio stations were allowed. Soon dozens of new stations went on the air, playing the music of the new wave of immigrants.

The singer Dalida was one of the first musicians from North Africa to achieve fame in Paris. Her father was Italian, the first violinist at the Cairo Opera. She moved to Paris in 1954 at the age of twenty and became a singer at Olympia Paris, and began making recordings. Her song Bambino in 1956 became a hit in France, selling three hundred thousand records, making her one of France's leading popular singers. She recorded Italians in French, Arabic, Italian, and a half-dozen other languages, before her death in 1987.

One of the first popular styles imported from North Africa was Raï, a singing style from the Algerian city of Oran. One of the first famous singer of the style, Khaled, was born in Oran in 1960, started a band when he was fourteen, and moved to France in 1986, where he became a recording star with an international audience.

In the 1980s and the 1990s, the traditional African, Maghreb and Caribbean musical styles were blended together with French and American styles of hip-hop, techno, and rap, to create an original style, which became popular well outside the immigrant communities.

Musical styles imported into Paris include Sega from the Island of Mauritius. Zouk from the Caribbean islands of Guadeloupe and Martinique, Zouglou, a dance-oriented style of music from Côte d'Ivoire; and Mbalax from Senegal and the Gambia. a fusion of popular Western music and dance such as jazz, soul, Latin, and rock blended with sabar, the traditional drumming and dance music of Senegal.

=== Cabarets and music halls ===
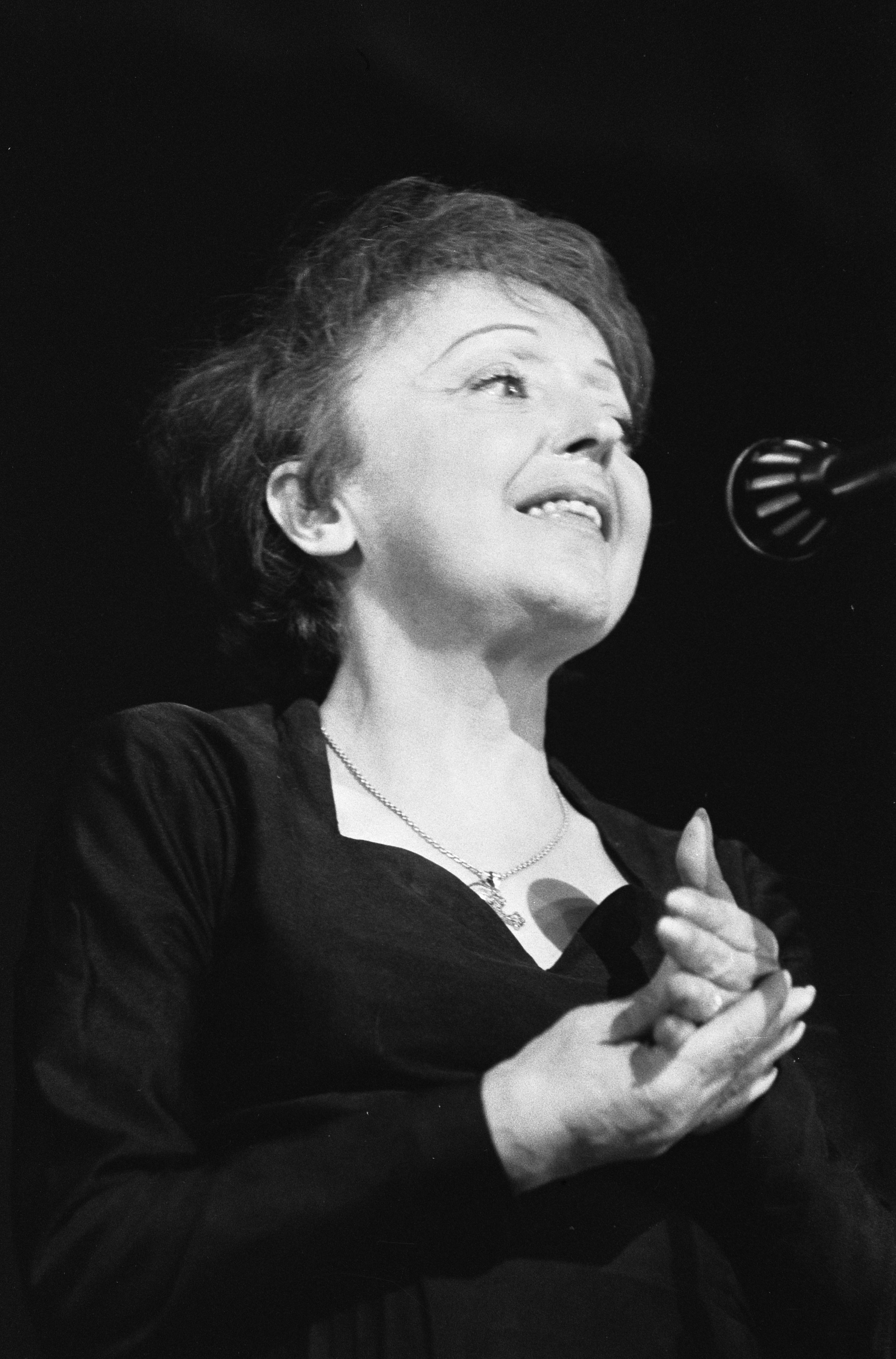
Edith Piaf in 1962

Between 1945 and 1960 the cabarets and music halls played an important part in Paris culture, giving a stage to established stars and new talent. The most important music halls of the period were the Olympia Paris and Bobino, while the important cabarets included La Galerie 55, L'Echelle de Jacob, le Port de Salut, l'Ecluse and Trois Baudets. Future French stars who debuted in the cabarets after the war included Bourvil in 1946, Yves Montand in 1947, Juliette Gréco in 1948, Georges Brassens at the Trois Baudets in 1952, and Jacques Brel at the same club in 1953. Headliners at the Olympia included Édith Piaf in 1949, Gilbert Bécaud in 1954, and Charles Aznavour, Tino Rossi and Dalida in 1955. Paris singing stars in the 1980s and 1990s included Serge Lama, Serge Gainsbourg, Michel Berger, Yves Duteil, Francis Cabrel, Patrick Bruel, and Jean-Jacques Goldman.

=== Classical music—the Orchestre de Paris ===
During first decades after the war Paris could boast four top-quality professional symphony orchestras: the Colonne orchestra at the Châtelet; the Lamoureux at Salle Pleyel; the Pasdeloup at the palais de Chaillot, and the Concert Society of the Conservatory at the théâtre des Champs-Élysées. The orchestras did not coordinate their programs; they played during the same season (October to Easter) at the same time (Sunday afternoons at 5:45) and for the most part played the same classical repertoire, rarely venturing into modern music.

In the late 1960s, André Malraux, the Minister of Culture under President Charles de Gaulle, decided to create a new orchestra as the prestige symphony of Paris. the Society of Concerts of the Conservatory was abolished in 1967, and replaced by the Orchestre de Paris. The French government provided sixty percent of the funding for the new orchestra, with smaller shares from the City of Paris and the Department of the Seine. The first conductor of the orchestra was Charles Munch. After his death in 1968, it was conducted by Herbert von Karajan, then Georg Solti, then Daniel Barenboim, who directed the orchestra from 1975 to 1989.

Much musical experimentation was taking place inside other Paris institutions. In 1954 Pierre Boulez founded Le Domaine musical, which between 1954 and 1966, presented regular concerts of new music by composers including Schoenberg and Webern. The most influential modernist composer in post-war Paris was Olivier Messiaen (1908-1992), organist at the Trinity Church beginning in 1930 and professor at the Paris Conservatory of Music from 1942. he was noted for his scientific study of bird songs (1958), his adaptations of traditional Asian and Latin American rhythms (1960); and original church music. Other notable composers included Pierre Schaeffer, founder of the school called Musique concrète, based on recorded sounds of the real world, such as the noise made by trains; and composer of Symphonie pour un home seul (1950) and Orphée 51 (1951); the composer Pierre Henry, a collaborator of Schaeffer, pioneer of electroacoustic music; and composer of The Well-Tempered microphone; and the conductor and composer Boulez, a pioneer of Serial music.

=== Musical theater—the mega-musical ===
Musical theater had a difficult time in the postwar years, due to stiff competition from musical films and high production costs. The exceptions were several mega-musicals first produced in Paris; Les Misérables, based on the novel by Victor Hugo, with music by Claude-Michel Schönberg and original French lyrics by Alain Boublil and Jean-Marc Natel, opened in Paris in 1980, and went on to success in London and New York, and became one of the most popular musicals of all time. Notre Dame de Paris, also based on a novel by Victor Hugo, with music composed by Riccardo Cocciante and lyrics by Luc Plamondon, opened on September 16, 1998, and made immediate stars of its lead singers, Hélène Ségara as Esmeralda and Garou, who played Quasimodo.

=== The Bastille Opera and the City of Music ===
The Opéra Bastille, opened in 1989

The Philharmonie de Paris in the Cité de la Musique at Parc de la Villette (2015)

When President François Mitterrand took office in 1981, his new culture minister, Jack Lang, launched a series musical innovations. On June 21, 1982, he began the Fete de la Musique, a day of free musical performances all over Paris and in other cities of France. A giant rock concert took place at the Trocadero, the opera orchestra played on the steps of the Opera Garnier, and the Garde Republicaine band played at the Pantheon. The Fete became an annual event. He also planned and began construction of a second opera house at Place de la Bastille, in place of an old suburban train station. Revolution. It was designed to have an equally good view from all seats (unlike the Palais Garnier) and to have less expensive tickets. After many technical problems, design changes, controversies and the dismissal of the opera's director, the Opera Bastille opened in July 1989.during the celebration of the bicentennial of the French Revolution.

The second grand musical project of Mitterrand and Lang, announced in 1982, was the Cité de la Musique, a large musical performance center at La Villette, a former-industrial section of the city. The first piece built was the Le Zénith, a concert hall with six thousand seats, inaugurated on January 12, 1984. It hosted concerts by Johnny Halladay, Serge Gainsbourg, Vanessa Paradis, the rock group Téléphone, and other celebrated Paris pop musicians. The Paris Conservatory of Music was moved to a new building on the site, opened to students in 1990. The museum of musical instruments of the Conservatory was opened at the beginning of 1997. The final piece, the Philharmonie de Paris concert hall, designed by architect Jean Nouvel, with 2,500 seats, was opened on January 24, 2015.

== See also ==
- Music of France

== Links to music by period ==
Early music

- Medieval motet in three voices from the School of Notre Dame
- Mass of Notre Dame in four voices by Guillaume de Machaut

16th century

- Listen to Song of the birds by Clement Janequin
- Listen to the song Je n'ose le dire by Pierre Certon

17th century

- Listen to songs of the French Royal Court from the 17th century
- Listen to "March for the Turkish Ceremony" by Jean-Baptiste Lully
- Watch a ballet from the opera Armide by Lully (1686)
- Listen to an organ work by François Couperin (1690)

18th century

- Watch Hippolyte et Aricie by Jean Philippe Rameau (1733)
- Listen to Mozart's Symphony number 31 (The Paris Symphony), written for the Concert Spirituel
- Listen to French popular music from the 18th century
- Listen to a song by André Grétry from the Paris Opéra-Comique (1788)

Songs of the French Revolution

- Listen to the Revolutionary song Ça ira
- Listen to La Carmagnole
- Listen to the Marseillaise, with English translation

The Second Empire

- Watch a scene from the opera Les Troyens by Hector Berlioz (1858)
- Watch scenes from the opera La Belle Hélène by Jacques Offenbach (1864)

1917–1939

- Watch an excerpt of the ballet Parade with music by Eric Satie and costumes by Picasso (1917)
- Listen to Mistinguett sing Mon Homme (1920)
- Watch performance of Josephine Baker at the Folies Bergere (1927)

Links to music (1940–1945)

- Listen to Johnny Hess sing Je suis Swing (1940)

Links to music of postwar Paris (1945–2000)

- Listen to Quartet for the End of Time by Olivier Messiaen (1941)
- Listen to Study of trains, a work of concrete music by Pierre Schaeffer (1948)
- Edith Piaf sings Milord
- Sidney Bechet and Claude Luter play Petit Fleur (1952)
- Watch performances of Sidney Bechet, Django Reinhardt and Louis Armstrong (1952)
- Watch an early performance by Johnny Hallyday (1961)
- Listen to Eddy Mitchell and the Chaussettes noires (1962)
