= Années folles =

Socio-economic period of French history

- 1920–1929
Belle Époque	Great Depression in France
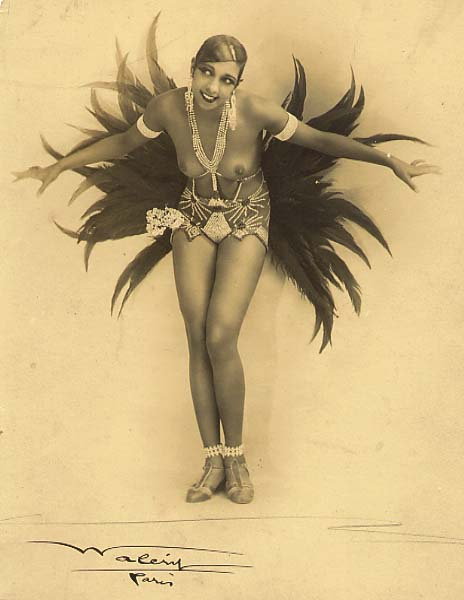
- Josephine Baker, iconic figure of the Années folles
- Location: France
- Key events: Rise of café society Emergence of Art Deco The School of Paris art movement

The Années folles (French pronunciation: [ane fɔl], "crazy years" in French) was the decade of the 1920s in France. It was coined to describe the social, artistic, and cultural collaborations of the period. The same period is also referred to as the Roaring Twenties or the Jazz Age in the United States. In Germany, it is sometimes referred to as the Golden Twenties because of the economic boom that followed the hyperinflation in 1923 until the Wall Street crash of 1929.

== Precursors ==
The utopian positivism of the 19th century and its progressive creed led to unbridled individualism in France. Art Nouveau extravagance began to evolve into Art Deco geometry after the First World War.

André Gide, who founded the Nouvelle Revue Française literary review in 1908, influenced Jean-Paul Sartre and Albert Camus. Tristan Tzara's 1918 Dada manifesto and the resulting Dada movement were very much a product of the interbellum: "Dadaists both embraced and critiqued modernity, imbuing their works with references to the technologies, newspapers, films, and advertisements that increasingly defined contemporary life". All these served as the precursors for the Années folles.

== Café society ==
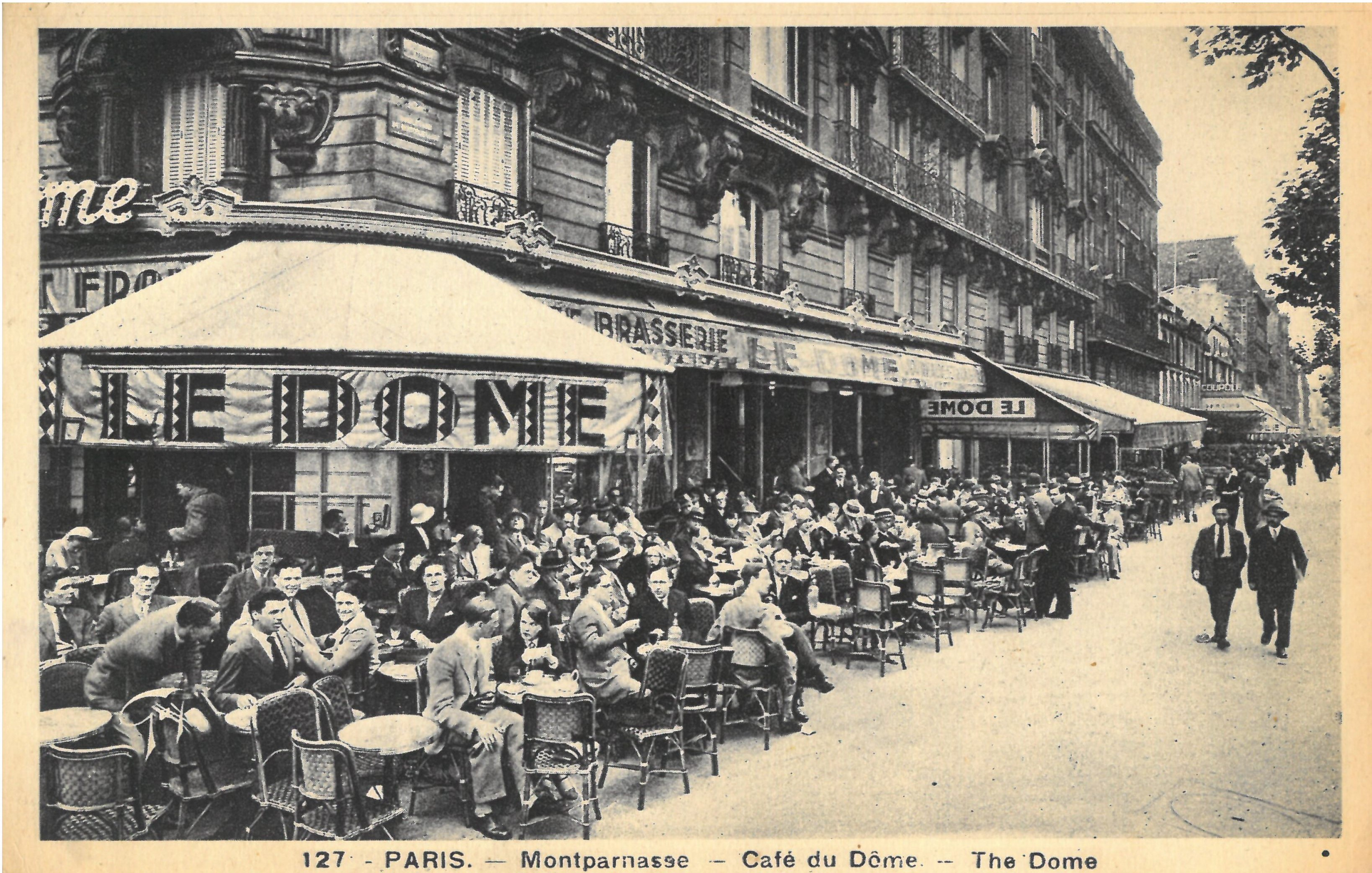
Café, Le Dôme, frequented by the artists of the School of Paris and literary intellectuals.

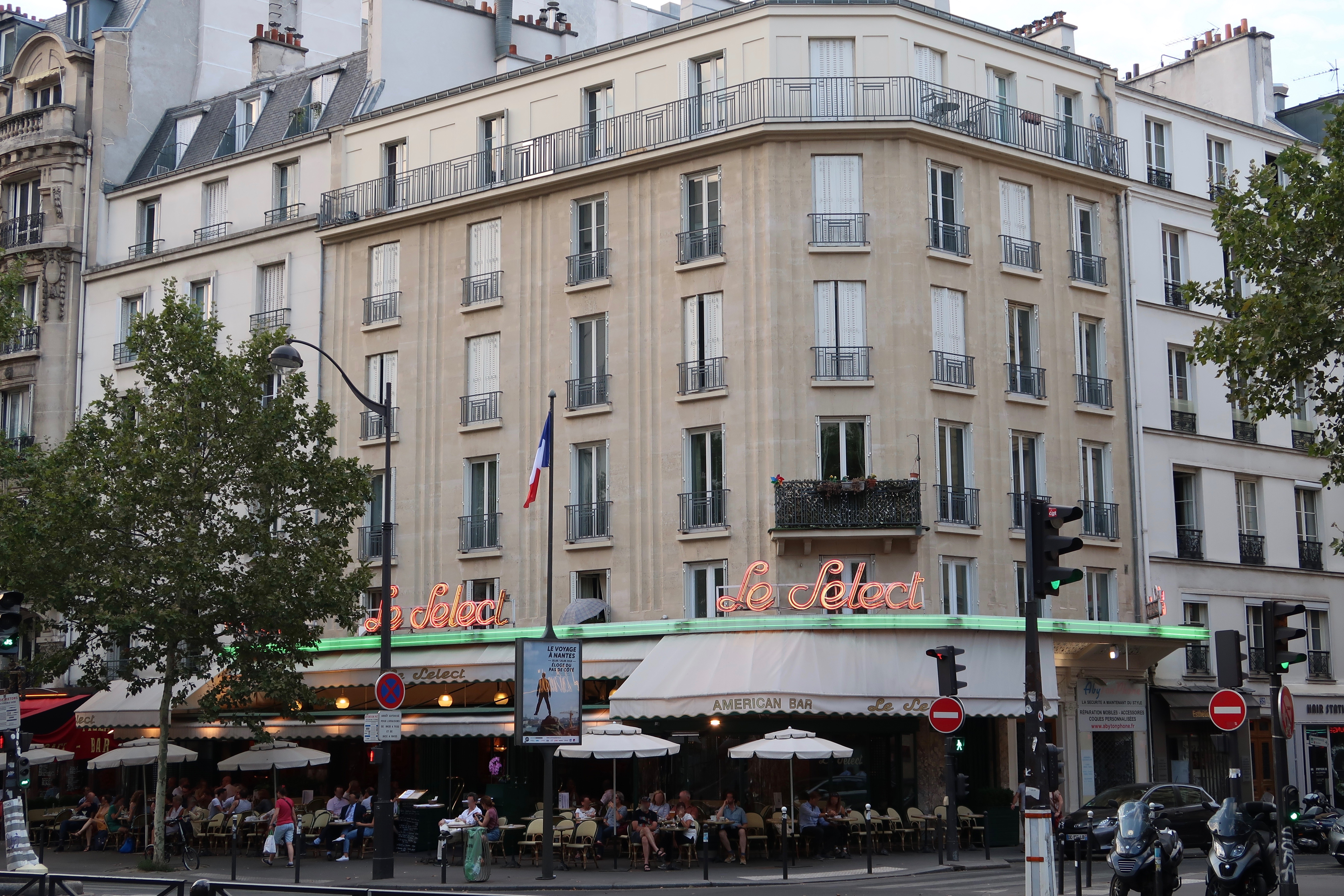
Café, Le Select, frequented by the artists of the School of Paris

Cafés around Paris became places where artists, writers, and others gathered. On the Rive Gauche (left bank) the scene centered around cafés in Montparnasse while on the Rive Droite (right bank), the Montmartre area.

=== Left bank ===
The Années folles in Montparnasse featured a thriving art and literary scene centered on cafés such as Brasserie La Coupole, Le Dôme Café, Café de la Rotonde, and La Closerie des Lilas as well as salons like Gertrude Stein's in the rue de Fleurus.

The Rive Gauche, or left bank, of the Seine in Paris, was and is primarily concerned with the arts and the sciences. Many artists settled there and frequented cabarets like Le Boeuf sur le Toit and the large brasseries in Montparnasse. American writers of the Lost Generation, like F. Scott Fitzgerald and Ernest Hemingway, met and mingled in Paris with exiles from dictatorships in Spain and Yugoslavia. They, along with the Jewish artists of the School of Paris such as Isaac Frenkel and Mane-Katz frequented also Le Select.

The painters of the School of Paris for example included among others Chaïm Soutine, Amedeo Modigliani, and Marc Chagall, who were Jews from Lithuania, Italy, and Russia, respectively. Later the American Henry Miller, like many other foreigners, gravitated to the rue Vavin and Boulevard Raspail. Montparnasse was, he said, "the navel of the world". Gertrude Stein also lived in Montparnasse during this period.

=== Right bank ===
Montmartre was a major center of Paris nightlife and had been famous for its cafés and dance halls since the 1890s. Trumpeter Arthur Briggs played at L'Abbaye and transvestites frequented La Petite Chaumière. After World War I, the artists who had inhabited the guinguettes and cabarets of Montmartre invented post-Impressionism during the Belle Époque.

In 1926, the facade of the Folies Bergère building was redone in Art Deco style by the artist Maurice Pico, adding it to the many Parisian theatres of the period in this architectural style.

== Art ==
=== School of Paris ===
In the 1920s a loose group of mainly immigrant artists emerged in Paris who were termed, the School of Paris by Andre Warnod in 1925 while writing for Comœdia. The artists tended to cloister around cafes, salons and other establishments in the Montparnasse quarter. Among these immigrant artists were many Jewish artists, most of whom originated from Eastern Europe such as Chaim Soutine, Jules Pascin, Yitzhak Frenkel, March Chagall and Amadeo Modigliani. These artists had an expressionist tendency, exploring Jewish themes as well as French and Parisian themes. Frenkel described the Jewish artists of the school as "members of the minority characterized by restlessness whose expressionism is therefore extreme in its emotionalism". The artists of the school according to Lurie would also portray humanity and emotion through facial expression. The art of the school during the Années folles would later on having a profound impact on the onset and development of modern art in Israel through Yitzhak Frenkel. Other artists who were associated with the school include Japanese artist Tsuguharu Foujita, Singaporean Liu Kang and others.

=== Surrealism ===
The Elephant Celebes, Max Ernst 1921. The Tate, London.

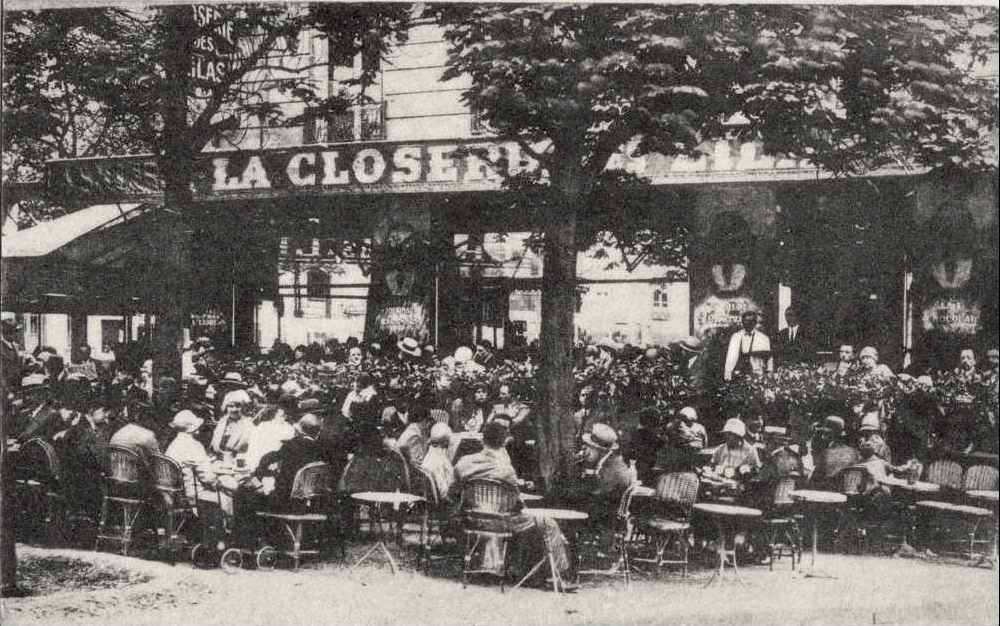
The Closerie des Lilas in 1909.

Surrealism came to the forefront in the 1920s cultural scene, bringing new forms of expression to poetry with authors like André Breton, whose Surrealist Manifesto appeared in 1924, Louis Aragon, Paul Éluard, and Robert Desnos. Émigré artists had created Post-Impressionism, Cubism, and Fauvism in Paris before World War I, and included Pablo Picasso, Marc Chagall, Amedeo Modigliani, and Piet Mondrian, along with French artists Pierre Bonnard, Henri Matisse, Jean Metzinger, and Albert Gleizes.

Surrealists also included artists like Max Ernst, Joan Miró, Salvador Dalí, and Francis Picabia, sculptors like Jean Arp, Germaine Richier and even early film-makers, like Luis Buñuel and René Clair.

=== Avant-garde ===
Jean Cocteau, while he denied belonging to the surrealists, was unquestionably avant-garde and collaborated with many of its members.

== Architecture ==
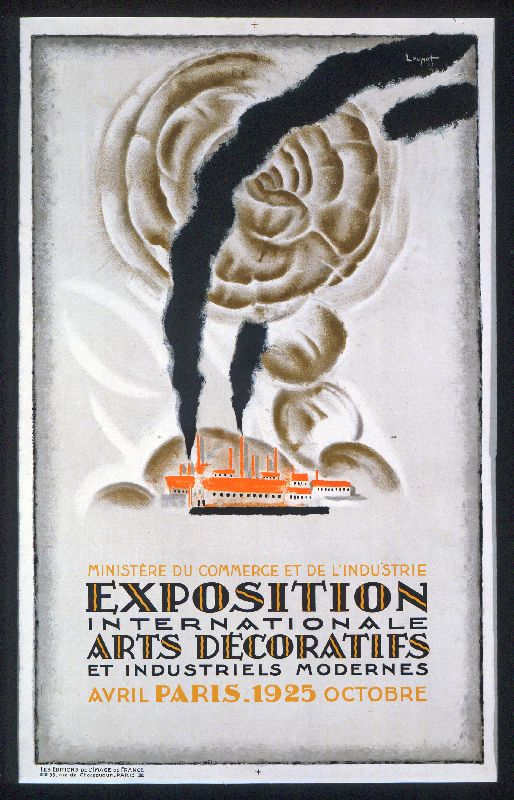
Paris Expo 1925

Architecture in 1920s in France underwent a shift from the Art Nouveau style to the Art Deco style. The Art Deco was named after the 1925 Paris exposition which was called Exposition internationale des Arts décoratifs et industriels modernes. The art deco style is marked by bold geometric forms, rich ornamentation, and the usage of luxurious materials.

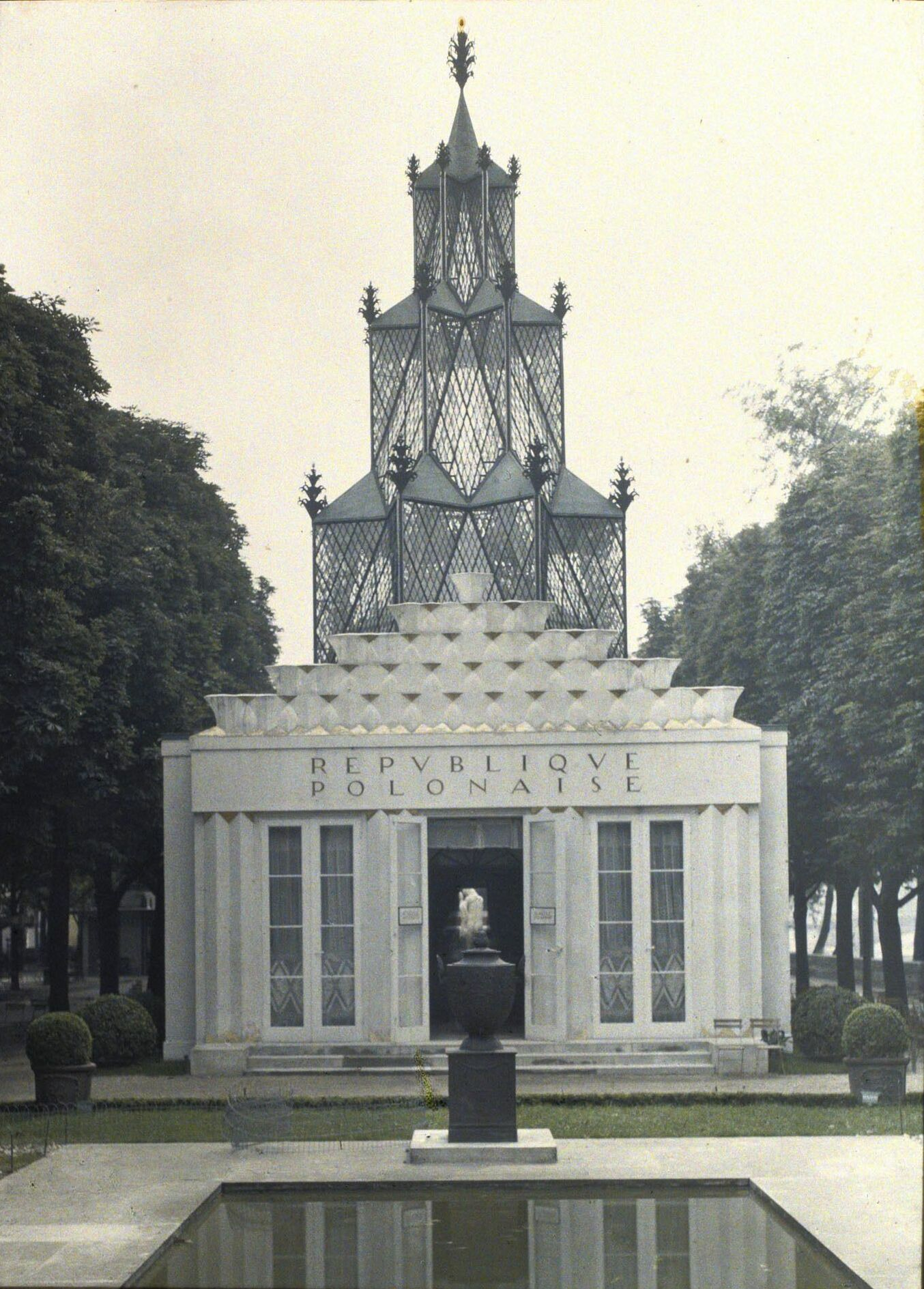
Polish pavilion, Exposition internationale des Arts décoratifs et industriels modernes, Paris 1925

The Exposition internationale des Arts décoratifs et industriels modernes attracted over sixteen million visitors, showcased a design ethos that celebrated modernity, ornamentation, and luxurious materials according to the MoMa. According to MoMa the works presented rejected historical styles, and many retained strong connections to French artistic traditions. French designers, who sought to revitalize the luxury trades and to counter competition from Austria and Germany, embraced the emerging Art Deco style. MoMa describes Art Deco as reflecting both technological innovation and a desire for opulence in the post-World War I era. The architecture style was influenced by avant-garde art movements such as Cubism, Orphism, and Fauvism further which brought about a synthesis of abstraction, stylization, and modern design principles.

Folies Bergere theatre and music hall, in the art deco style

As the Art Deco style flourished, it fostered close connections between design, fashion, and broader cultural trends. Collaborations between couturiers and interior decorators underscored the importance of aesthetic coherence not only in fashion but also in the design of domestic spaces and luxury goods. Following the great depression, in the 1930s, the exuberance of Art Deco diminished, partly as a consequence of the economic downturn brought about by the Great Depression and a growing preference for classical simplicity over lavish ornamentation. This transition, which according to MoMa was known as the “Return to Order,” emphasized monumental forms and a more restrained aesthetic that conveyed stability and confidence during times of social and economic uncertainty. The 1937 Exposition Internationale des Arts et Techniques dans la Vie Moderne in Paris, which focused on technological progress rather than luxury, symbolically marked the end of the Art Deco era.

Simultaneously, during the 1920s modernist architecture was further developed by Le Corbusier. His 1923 publication, Vers une architecture, introduced the "Five Points of Architecture," advocating for principles such as pilotis (supports), flat roofs, open floor plans, horizontal windows, and free façades. These ideas were materialized in projects like the Villa La Roche (1923–1925) and the Pavillon de l'Esprit Nouveau, presented at the 1925 Paris Exposition.

== Entertainment ==
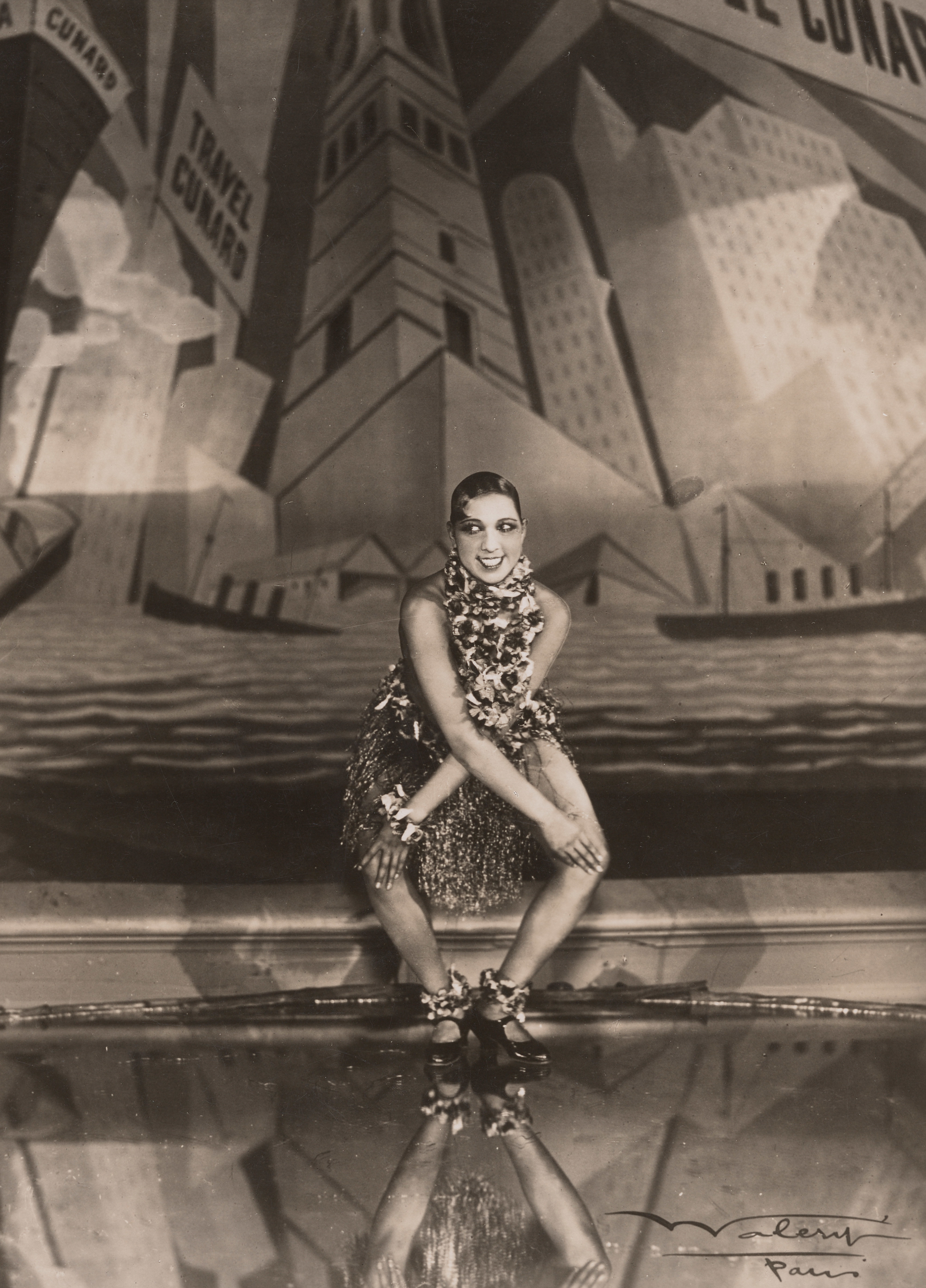
Josephine Baker dancing the Charleston, in the silent film La Folie du jour (1927), one of the acts in the revue of the same name at the Folies Bergère, Paris

In the 1920s, Parisian nightlife was greatly influenced by American culture. One of its greatest influences was the ragtime called jazz, which became very popular in Paris. "Ragtimitis" came to Paris with a rendition of "The Memphis Blues" by a U.S. Army band led by New York Army National Guard Lieutenant James Reese Europe. The band, known as the Harlem Hellfighters of the 369th Infantry Regiment, "... started ragtimitis in France", according to band member Noble Sissle. It was very successful in 1925 at the Théâtre des Champs-Élysées where La Revue nègre also was playing, led by Florence Mills, known by her stage name as Flossie Mills.

In 1926, Baker, an African American expatriate singer, dancer, and entertainer, caused a sensation at the Folies Bergère. In a new revue, La Folie du jour, in which she danced the "Banana Dance" wearing a costume revealing all but a skirt made of a string of artificial bananas. Wearing only her loincloth of bananas, Baker suggestively performed to a Charleston tempo – a genre still new to Europe. Her French producer Jacques-Charles produced her dance numbers with French preconceptions of eroticized savages in mind. Baker performed the piece mostly nude with her partner, Joe Alex. This dance inspired a 1929 tempera painting titled Josephine Baker, first shown by the painter Ivanhoe Gambini in an exhibition of the Radiofuturista Lombardo group he founded.

The scandal which erupted over Baker's dancing gave way to enthusiasm and quickly generated excitement among Parisians for jazz and black music. The Charleston can be danced solo, in pairs or in groups, to the rhythms of jazz. It is based on the movements of the body weight from one leg to the other, with the feet turned inward and knees slightly bent.

Of all the fashionable cabarets, the most famous was called Le Boeuf sur le Toit where the pianist and French composer Jean Wiener played. Such entertainment reached only a tiny part of the French population, the elite. Nevertheless, it gave the impulse, created the event.

=== American influence ===
American culture of the Roaring Twenties had a substantial influence on France, which imported jazz, the Charleston, and the shimmy, as well as cabaret and nightclub dancing. Interest in American culture increased in the Paris of the 1920s, and shows and stars of Broadway theatre introduced as innovations for the élite and were imitated thereafter.

This was the case for the famous Revue Nègre in 1925 at the Théâtre des Champs-Élysées. Josephine Baker danced the Charleston almost naked, with provocative gestures set to music by Sidney Bechet. Important Paris designers like Paul Poiret fought to design clothes for her. Inspired and influenced by the French Colonial Empire, Josephine Baker appeared in the revue La Folie du jour in 1926, and from the cafés chantants, also successfully picked up popular songs such as "La Petite Tonkinoise" by Vincent Scotto. In 1927 she starred in the silent film Siren of the Tropics, which opened to rave reviews. The 1930 song "J'ai deux amours" enshrined Baker as a full-featured star of Parisian nightlife, who not only danced, but also commented on the music and did comedy.

While she appeared at the Folies Bergère, Baker opened her own nightclub, called "Chez Joséphine", in the rue Fontaine.

=== Dance ===
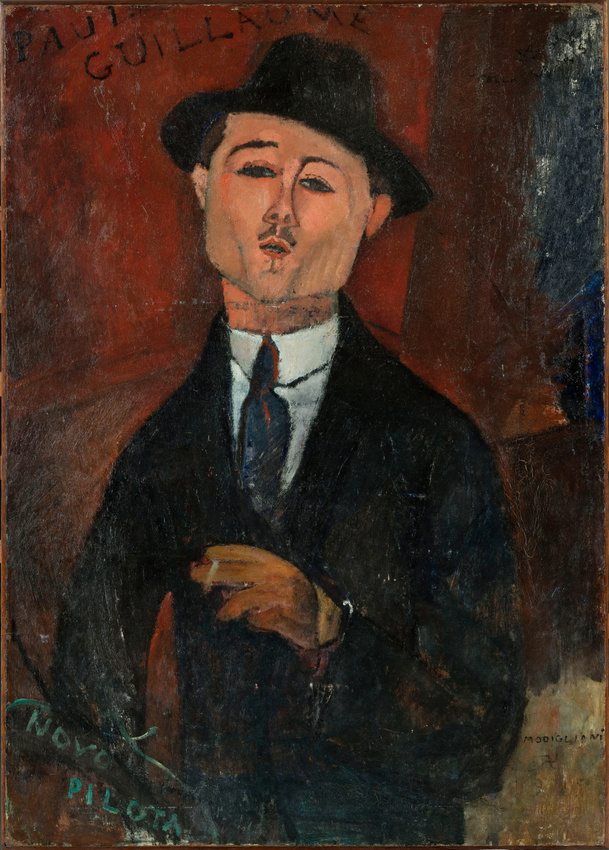
Amedeo Modigliani - Paul Guillaume

Paul Guillaume in 1919 organized a "Negro festival" at the Théatre des Champs-Élysées. Six years later, he also produced the Paris La Revue nègre. On rue Blomet, the Bal Nègre cabaret attracted both aesthetes and the curious.

==== Ballets suédois ====
The 1920s also marked a renewal in ballet. The Ballets Russes were based in Paris during this time. In 1921 the Ballets suédois offered L'Homme et son désir by Paul Claudel, with music by Darius Milhaud. The company then presented Les mariés de la tour Eiffel, written by Jean Cocteau. Alas, it did not meet with public success. In 1923 another ballet was born, La création du monde; Darius Milhaud wrote the music, and Blaise Cendrars the scenario. Fernand Léger designed the costumes and put onto the stage gigantic animals, birds, insects and totemic gods.

The adventure of the Ballets suédois ended in 1924 with a ballet called Relâche written by Erik Satie and sets by Francis Picabia.

Salon gatherings were another important form of entertainment. Princess de Polignac's gatherings continued to be important to avant-garde music. The circles of Madame de Noailles included Proust, Francis Jammes, Colette, Gide, Frédéric Mistral, Robert de Montesquiou, Paul Valéry, Cocteau, Pierre Loti, Paul Hervieu, and Max Jacob.

=== Music ===
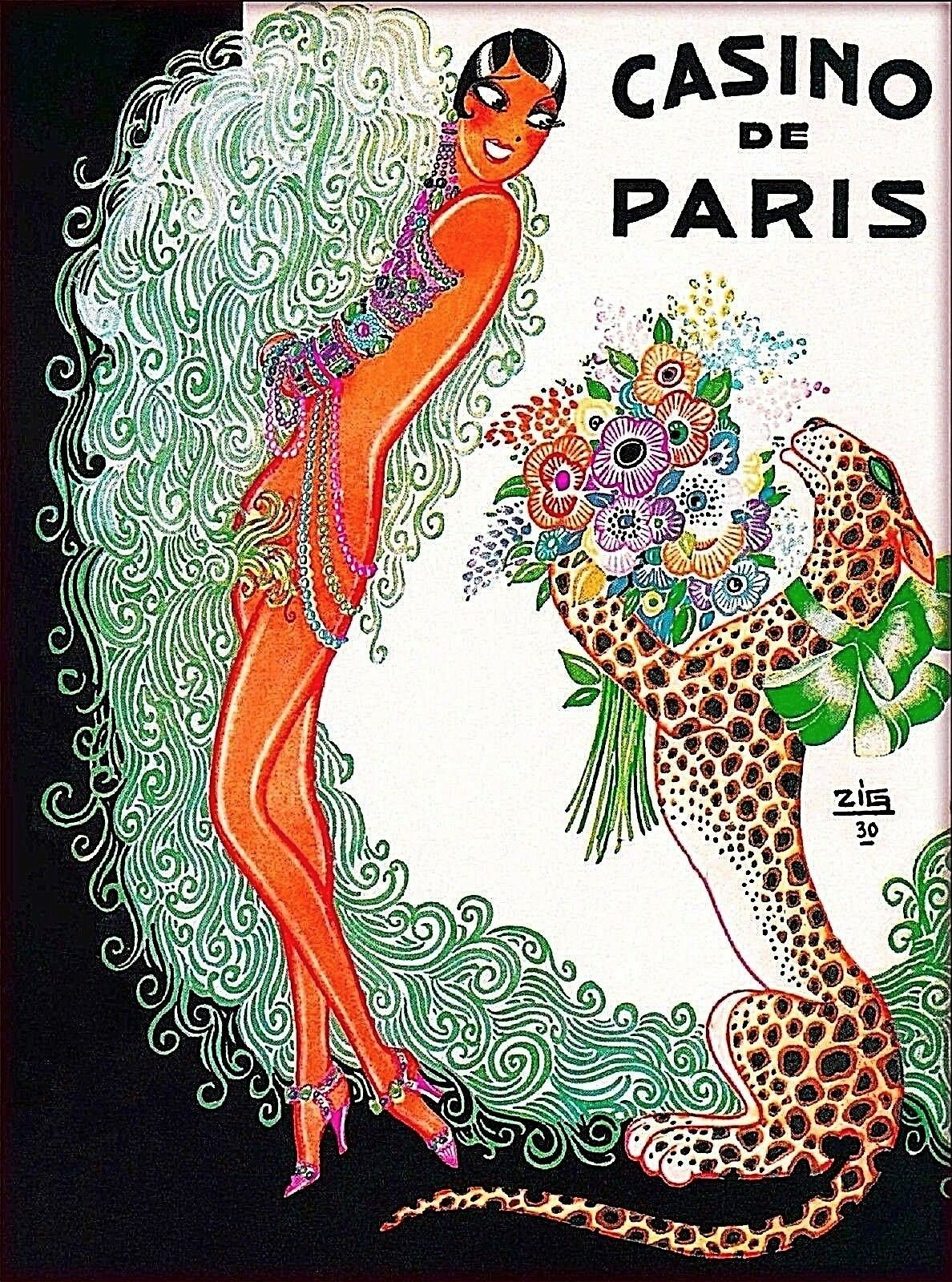
Casino de Paris poster featuring Josephine Baker

During this period the music hall permanently replaced the café-chantant. People often went to the Casino de Paris, the Paris concert, the concert Mayol and the theater; spectacles, attractions, and songs occurred at a rapid pace. Artistic productions had a meteoric rise. Some of the best-known examples were American-influenced shows at the Casino de Paris -- Paris qui dance (1919), Cach' ton piano (1920), and Paris qui jazz (1920–21), Mon homme and Dans un fauteuil gave rise to stardom for Maurice Chevalier and Mistinguett. American influences such as musicals underlay the success of the Folies Bergère, the famous "Mad Berge", inaugurated with Les Folies raging in 1922.

A number of classical music composers, such as those of the School of Paris and Les Six, also flourished at this time. "The musical influence of Paris, dominated first by Debussy and then by Stravinsky, seems to have been almost inescapable for composers in the first four decades of the century."

=== Operetta ===
Operetta had a turning point on 12 November 1918 with the premiere of Phi-Phi by Henri Christiné and Albert Willemetz. Up to a thousand performances were played in just two years. The popular Dédé was staged in 1921 by Maurice Chevalier.

Operetta attracted talented composers such as Marseille's Vincent Scotto, and also Maurice Yvain (a composer of Mistinguett's signature song Mon Homme), and author Sacha Guitry, who wrote the libretto for L'amour masqué.

In the Olympia at the Bobino, the Théâtre de la Gaîté-Montparnasse showcased Marie Dubas and Georgius, who inaugurated the Singing Theatre by staging popular songs. From 1926, American titles such as No, No, Nanette, Rose-Marie and Show Boat began to be adapted for French viewers.

=== Sports ===
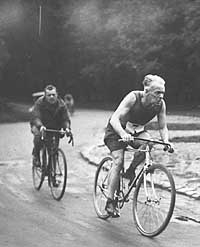
Cyclist Henri Desgrange in 1922

Sports spectacles were also popular during the Années folles. Attendance at sporting venues increased significantly in the years following the war and the press gave sporting events an audience and growing popularity. The newspapers played a significant role in promoting sports through dedicated sports pages, giving popularity to the Tour de France, football and rugby. Moreover, sports, which previously had been limited only to those of affluent backgrounds, now began to extend to the masses. The major sporting event during this decade was Olympic Games in Paris in 1924, in which 3,092 athletes from 44 countries participated, and no fewer than 625,000 spectators attended.

=== Film ===
Silent film, called "cinéma", rose to popularity in the 1920s. Scientists of the time were predicting little future for it. Silent film is considered by some as the carefree innocence of years or 7th Art. Max Linder, after being discovered by Charles Pathé, became integral in making the film a cultural phenomenon.

European film production almost completely stopped during World War I, as most actors were drafted into the war. The public took refuge in theaters trying to forget the horrors of the front with films such as Charlie Chaplin's A Dog's Life. Hollywood films saw massive growth in demand thanks to a sharp decline in European production; it exported an increasing number of films. In 1919, films from the United States accounted for about 90% of films screened in Europe.

Some films showed the influence of surrealism, with director Luis Buñuel collaborating with Salvador Dalí on his first short film, Un Chien Andalou. René Clair's silent films blended comedy and fantasy.

=== Theatre ===
In the Paris of the 1920s, the theater was essentially dominated by four directors -- Louis Jouvet, Georges Pitoëff, Charles Dullin and Gaston Baty. They decided in 1927 to join efforts to create the "Cartel of Four." However, they had much less success than Sacha Guitry in Théâtre des Variétés. There are also parts of Alfred Savoir, comedies of Édouard Bourdet and those of Marcel Pagnol that met with some success.

Specifically, the theatrical performance was a great success with audiences and had an undeniable renewal in 1920, first at the stage performance. Around the "Cartel" develops a creative effort to bring in staging the concerns and aspirations of the time. The change is also reflected in the choice of themes and atmosphere that emerges from the works presented. But parallel to this, the educated public is interested elites increasingly to authors and works that combine classical in the form and the opposition reality/dream at the theatrical atmosphere. Also, the theater Jean Cocteau, the first pieces of Jean Giraudoux such as Siegfried in 1928 and the works of Italian Luigi Pirandello are famous examples that were very successful.

In 1920, post-impressionist painter Nils Dardel and de Maré together created Ballets suédois at the Théâtre des Champs-Élysées. In the autumn of 1924, Giorgio de Chirico curated the scenography and costumes for Luigi Pirandello's "The Jar".

== The birth of a popular culture ==
Along with the elite culture that characterized the 1920s, there arose at the same time in Paris, a popular culture. The First World War upset many things, even in song. After four years without Belle Époque, new artists emerged in fashionable places. The music hall, for example, while attracting artists and intellectuals in search of novelty, also gives the popular media.

In the same period were the beginnings of Maurice Chevalier, the ultimate illustration of good French mood through one of his songs, "Valentine". The lead dancer Mistinguett, nicknamed La Miss, had successful popular tunes such as Always on the grind, I'm fed up.

== Fashion and style ==
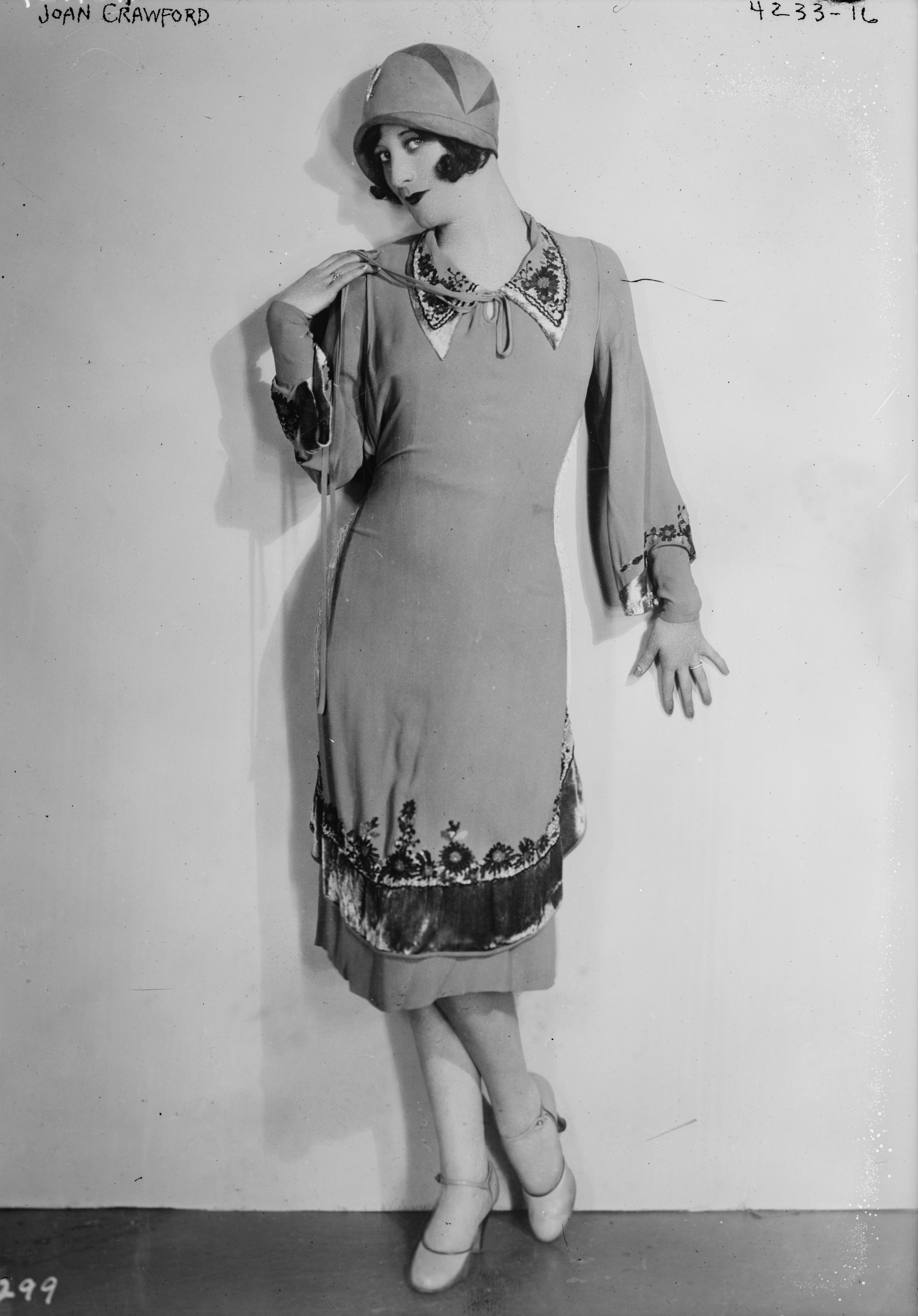
Women's fashion of the year 1927

=== The emancipated look ===
The garçonne (flapper) look in women's fashion emerged in Paris, promoted especially by Coco Chanel. The boyish look was characterized by a loose, streamlined, androgynous silhouette where neither the bust nor the waist are evident, accompanied by a short hairdo. In 1926 Chanel released a straight sheath of black crêpe de Chine (a color previously reserved for bereavement), with 3/4 sleeves and no collar. The celebrated "little black dress" was the perfect evocation of garçonne style, erasing the forms of the female body. Copied many times over, it would become a classic item of womenswear of the 1920s and beyond.

== Economic growth ==
The Années folles were also a period of strong economic growth. New products and services in booming markets boost the economy: radio, automobile, aviation, oil, electricity. French production of hydropower increases eightfold during the decade. Cheaper electricity favored industrial companies, which in 1928 had three of the top five highest market capitalizations on the Paris stock exchange and five out of the top ten, in a decade where total stock market valuation soared by a factor of 4.4. The 6th is a young innovative company, which is only fifteen Air Liquide, already has a global stature. The manufacturing production index reached in 1928 the level of 139 for a 100 in 1914, with very strong sectoral disparities: it is only 44 for the index shipbuilding 100 to steel and 422 to the automobile. The French overall index fell to 57 in 1919 and 50 in 1921, but already risen to 104 in 1924. It took 6 years to clear the shortage of energy caused by the reconstruction of the northern mines that the Germans had drowned during World War I.

== Radio ==
Radio played a leading role, becoming a preferred vehicle for the new mass culture. It provided greater information on news and culture to an increasing number of people, especially the working classes. Radio quickly propelled Mistinguett and Maurice Chevalier to the rank of national and international stardom, and they quickly become icons of Parisian lifestyle.

== End of an era ==
The Wall Street crash of 1929 brought an end to the exuberant zeitgeist in the United States, although the crisis didn't actually reach Europe until 1931. In 1928, the Parisian theater La Cigale, then the Olympia and the Moulin Rouge suffered the same fate in 1929, being torn down at the end of the decade. Although production was intended for a wide audience, most people attended music halls and other dance halls. Their world of song was primarily that of the street, the javas and tangos of dances, weddings, and banquets and not of the Parisian high society. Parallel to this culture of elites, at the same time in Paris, existed a popular culture that was increasingly successful and came to dominate the late 1920s and early 1930s through artists such as Maurice Chevalier or Mistinguett.

== See also ==
- International Style (architecture)
- Paris between the Wars (1919–1939)
- Weimar culture
- Golden Twenties
- Roaring Twenties
- 1920s in jazz
- 1920s in Western fashion
