= Java (dance) =

20th century French dance

Java (French: [ʒa.va]) is a dance which was developed in France in the early part of the 20th century. The origin of its name is uncertain, but it probably evolved from the valse.

Mainly performed in French bal-musette between 1910 and 1960, the dance was largely conceived due to popular demand for a new type of waltz, in particular, one which was easier, faster, more sensual, and would not require a dance hall as large as those typically used for waltzes.

Java takes the form of a fast waltz, with the dancers dancing very close to one another, taking small steps to advance. Men will often place both their hands on their partner's buttocks while dancing. Naturally, this led some of the more respectable bal-musette dance halls banning java.

== Titles ==
- Mistinguett - La java, 1923
- Georgius - La plus bath des javas, 1925
- Alibert and Gaby Sims - Un petit cabanon, 1935
- Edith Piaf - La java de cézigue, 1936
- Fréhel - La Java bleue, 1938
- Darcelys - Une partie de pétanque, 1941
- Edith Piaf - L'Accordéoniste, 1942
- Boris Vian - La Java des bombes atomiques, 1955
- Léo Ferré - Java partout, 1957
- Claude Nougaro - Le Jazz et la Java, 1962
- Serge Gainsbourg - La Javanaise, 1963
- Michel Sardou - La Java de Broadway, 1977
- TC Matic - Le Java, 1982

== On film ==
A java is danced during a key scene at a working class café in Jean Vigo's film L'Atalante (1934). Composer Maurice Jaubert arranged his java melody for player piano; it recurs later in the soundtrack as a refrain for accordion.
