= Paul Colin (artist) =

French artist

- Born: 27 June 1892; Nancy, France
- Died: 18 June 1985 (aged 92); Nogent-sur-Marne
- Education: L'Ecole des Beaux-Arts
- Known for: Scenography; Graphic Design; Theatre design; Poster design
- Movement: Surrealism; Cubism

Paul Colin (French pronunciation: [pɔl kɔlɛ̃]; 27 June 1892 – 18 June 1985) born in Nancy, France, died in Nogent-sur-Marne. Colin was a prolific master illustrator of Decorative Arts posters. Alexandre-Marie Colin (5 December 1798 – 21 November 1875) was a relative.

Paul Colin was a professional artist, scenographer, graphic designer and theatre painter. He specialised in theatre sets, book design and costume design. During his lifetime he created over 1900 posters and worked in theatre for more than 40 years. He was praised for the perfect combination of organic and graphic themes with geometric forms. He was influenced by Surrealism and Cubism, typically using very exaggerated shapes, striking colours and very stylised art forms in his work. He used a large palette of colours to emphasise the energy and meaning conveyed by his subjects, and his art is strongly in the style of the Art Deco movement. Many of his most famous illustrations were created for Jazz Age music and theatre. His designs incorporate jazz elements, bold and striking colors, Cubist and Surrealist. Highly stylized or caricaturized humanoids are strangely juxtaposed with geometrically overlapping objects such as Cubist collages. His own background in painting and his love of theatre helped him to become one of the most important French poster artists of the 1920s and 1930s.

Colin designed posters for artists and theatres such as the Folies Bergère, the Moulin Rouge and the Théâtre des Champs-Élysées. In addition, he produced posters for various festivals, exhibitions, products and companies. For example, he designed posters for French films such as Le Voyage Imaginaries and produced stage and costume designs for theatres. He taught for over 40 years at the "Ecole Paul Colin" graphic arts school in Paris, where many graphic artists and designers have benefited.

An original vintage poster of singer and Broadway star Adelaide Hall by Paul Colin advertising Blackbirds at the Moulin Rouge in 1929, sold on 2 October 2003 at Swann Auction Galleries in New York for $167,500. The sale signaled a record high for an original Paul Colin poster.

== Biography ==
Paul Colin was a maestro of the Art Deco poster. He was one of the most important graphic artists of his time, creating more than 1,900 posters, and was a master of designing books, theatre sets and costumes. He apprenticed at a printing house in Nancy at the age of 15 and through his teenage years, then he entered L'Ecole des Beaux-Arts in 1913. The L'Ecole des Beaux-Arts was founded in Paris by a minister of Louis XIV, Jean-Baptiste Colbert in 1671, as a school of fine arts. It provides tuition in painting, sculpture and engraving for students selected through competitive examinations. He achieved great academic success at school. Later, he first entered the art world with the help of Eugène Vallin, a renowned furniture designer and architect, and Victor Prouvé, a sculptor, painter and engraver. He is the teacher of Louise Bourgeois, an installation artist.

Throughout his career, Colin adjusted the Art Deco style to his own distinctive style, evolving with his understanding of symbolism and abstraction. He excelled in the deceptively simple way in which he portrayed his work. Over his lifetime, he designed dozens of posters for performers in various media, reflecting the history of Parisian show business and the public life he led. His posters are highly stylized, concentrating on themes in the performing arts, dance, studio art and theatre. His bold imagery, strong clean lines and brilliant colors are a hallmark of his work. Among these, his posters La Revue nègre and Le Tumulte noir are internationally recognized for their vibrant colors and strong lines.

== Artworks ==
=== Le Tumulte noir ===
The protagonist in Le Tumulte noir is Josephine Baker. In 1925, 19-year-old Josephine Baker made her debut on stage at the Théâtre des Champs-Élysées in Paris, causing a sensation.

After the horrors of World War I, a fascination with Africa and a frenzy of American jazz swept through Paris, and "Black juggling" was very popular. Using this enthusiasm, the young Baker was invited from New York to star in La Revue nègre. Her debut was a huge success and was soon invited by Folies Bergère, where her signature performance was a dance in which she wore only a skirt made from artificial bananas. The other prints in the series show a variety of performers from the Satire, including a double sheet effect depicting an orchestra performing against an Art Deco cityscape and Parisians dancing the Charleston in ecstasy.

Le Tumulte noir was painted on stone and then hand colored using a popular and time-consuming technique known at the time as pochoir. This process involved applying individual stencils and special bristle pom-poms for each color. Le Tumulte noir is a remarkable achievement in Art Deco and graphic design, a style that takes its name from the 1925 Exposition of Decorative Arts in Paris. The collection also features elements influenced by artists such as the Cubist painter Fernand Léger and the Mexican-born artist Miguel Covarrubias.

Le Tumulte noir celebrates the spirit of unfettered expression that Josephine Baker displayed throughout her career. Showcasing Paul Colin's tribute to the great African-American artists that brought the Jazz Age to Paris, it celebrates not only Josephine Baker, but also the love of Charleston and jazz in France, and the impact these artists had on French popular culture in the 1920s.

=== La Revue nègre ===
This poster, which helped to establish Paul Colin's career, as well as the career of subject Josephine Baker, has had a huge impact in the field of poster art. Considered Paul Colin's first "masterpiece", La Revue nègre includes only two basic colors, red and black, with clear, well-distributed, and modern lettering. The poster shows Josephine Baker in a tight white dress with her fists on her hips and her hair slicked back. She appears between two black men, one wearing a hat tilted over his eyes and a plaid bow tie, the other with a broad smile. Though initially released as a trial run, it acted as an impressive invitation to the concert hall.

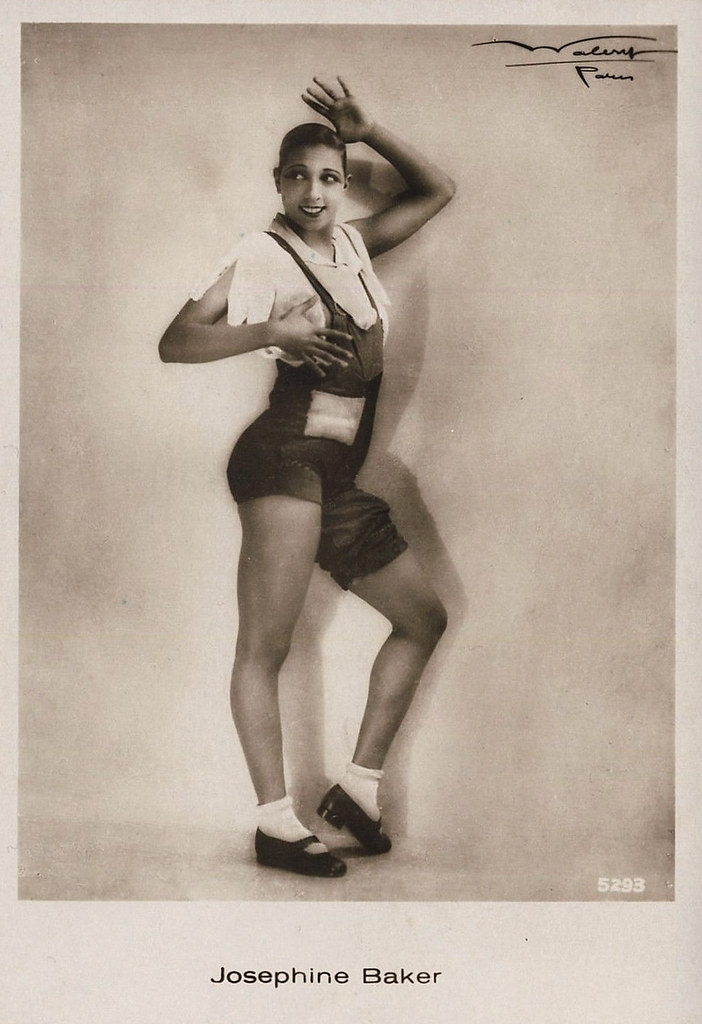
A portrait of Josephine Baker

In 1925, Josephine Baker and the musicians and performers of her troupe, La Revue nègre, were hitting the stage of the Théâtre des Champs-Élysées in Paris because of a "wild new dance" known as the Charleston. At this time the Jazz Age was in its peak, and Josephine Baker was a representative of that era. Her performance La Revue nègre was a huge success in France in 1925. Paul Colin boldly designed posters and sets in red, black and white to cheer the arrival of the African American dancers. Paul Colin's painting captures the lively gestures of the 'wild dance' of the Charleston dance, which was imported from America, and the rhythms of the new art form known as jazz.

In 1926 Baker left the Revue and disbanded the troupe, but her fame continued to grow with her outstanding performances in the clubs of Paris, and in 1927 she contributed to the publication of a memoir with illustrations by Colin.

And in the same year, due to the growing popularity of Baker, Colin organized a very large event called "Bal Nègre", which was attended by about 3000 Parisians. The success of this event, accompanied by a growing public frenzy for Baker's music and dancing, prompted Colin to create Le Nomte noir in 1929 as a celebration of this grand phenomenon. Baker is portrayed twice in this series of works. In one painting she is wearing a dress made of palm leaves and in the other she is wearing the famous banana yellow dress introduced at the Folies-Bergère concert hall in 1926. These works were intended as a tribute to Josephine Baker and other African American actors. They attracted the attention of the Parisian public during the années folles. Colin's vivid colours and lines demonstrate the extraordinary talent of these dancers and musicians, and his sketches express the Parisian fascination with all things black.

Colin met Josephine Baker in the troupe. Colin observed rehearsals for two or three hours but was dissatisfied with the stars and immediately met Josephine Baker. According to him, "Baker was in my studio, completely naked, and her perfect sensationalism. I persuaded the theater's management to make her a star instead of the burly black lady. Then we organised [sic] a grand theatrical event with a grand evening at the theatre with dinner including caviar and champagne"; the next morning, Josephine was unanimously welcomed by the Parisian press. Colin's poster made Josephine a focal point in the town. The two became lifelong friends after a brief romance.

Baker and Colin's encounter was lucky for both of them. Baker found a loyal supporter who would introduce her to French society and to some of Paris's artistic elite. Colin found himself a muse and produced about 1900 posters and hundreds of stage sets, which enabled him to achieve a pre-eminent position in French graphic arts. Josephine eventually became a star of the Paris Opera and a popular entertainer in Paris. This story is a collaboration between these two artists and a visual history of the excitement for music in the Parisian era known as the 'jazz boom'. And both Josephine Baker and Paul Colin were awarded the Croix de Guerre for their bravery during the war.

Baker's stepson, Jean-Claude Baker, states in his biography of her that he had discovered a sketch by the painter Miguel Covarrubias, the set designer for the revue, identical to the poster, and preceding Paul Colin's and Josephine Baker's first meeting. "There they were, the three people of the poster of La Revue nègre: a slender girl in a tight white dress, flanked by two men, one with a frieze of nappy hair, big red lips, the other with a hat tilted over one eye and a checked bow tie. The girl everyone believed to be Josephine, the one Paul Colin said he had sketched from life, had been drawn by Covarrubias before Colin ever set eyes on Josephine." He claims to have met others who confirm the secret.

== Academic and career ==
In 1923, Paul Colin met André Daven, the new director of the Champs-Elysées theatre, who was seeking talent and new shows. Colin designed his first poster for the film Imaginary Journey Voyage two years later, and in the meantime, he began work for Josephine Baker. Colin captured the Jazz Age in Paris in his work for Le Tumulte noir. It was the poster that launched him to fame, and he created other works in his signature style. He then designed theatre and film sets, which made him famous throughout Paris. Paul Colin founded his poster school in 1930, which trained many talented designers for the future. Paul Colin worked until the 1970s. For more than 40 years, he worked in theater, creating nearly 2,000 posters and hundreds of stage sets.
