= Negrophilia =

Fetishization of Black culture

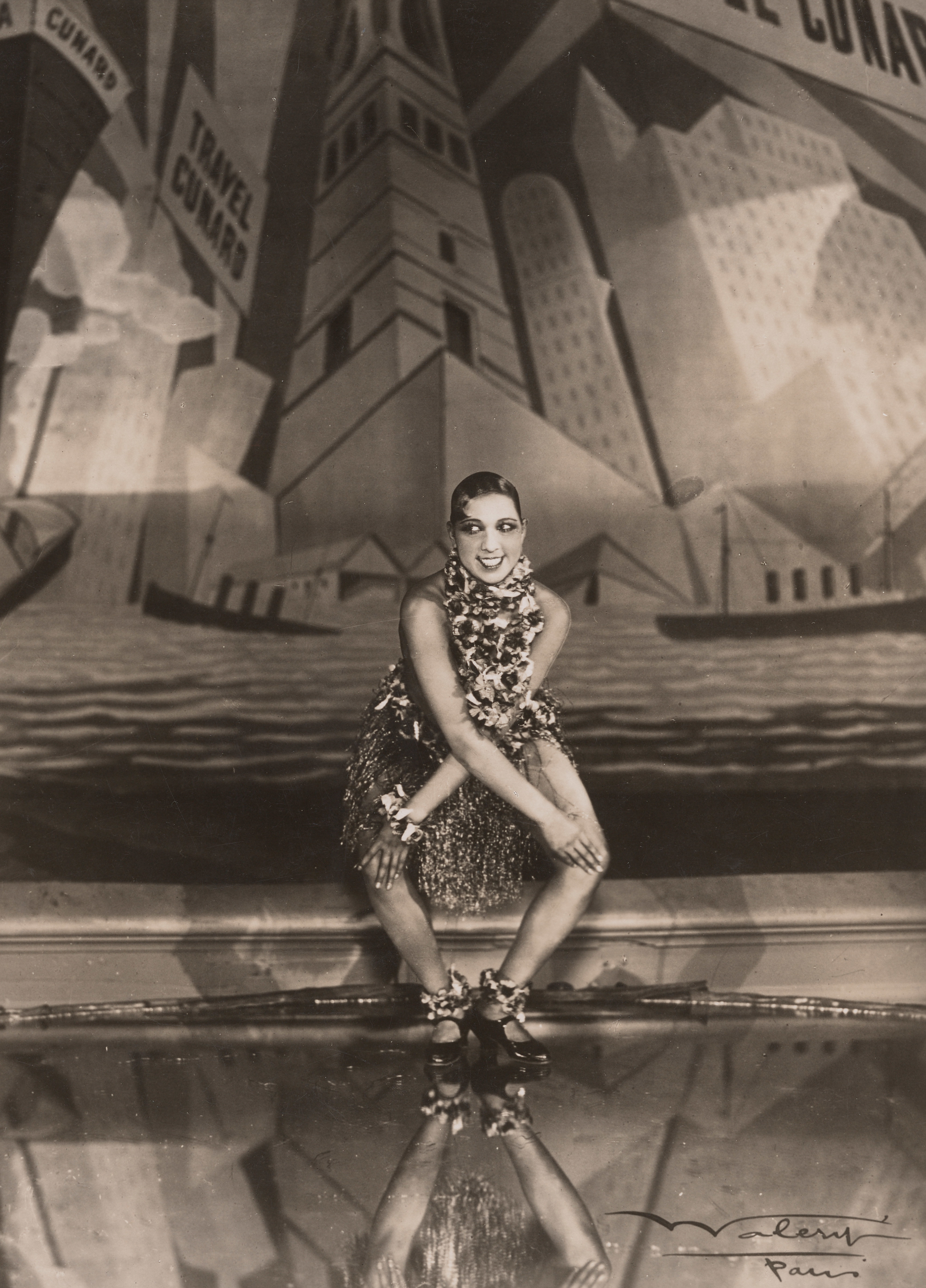
Josephine Baker dancing the Charleston at the Folies Bergère, Paris, in 1926

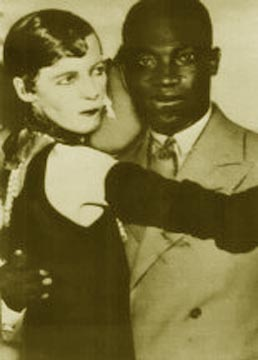
Nancy Cunard (1928), activist, heiress and negrophile, with an unidentified partner

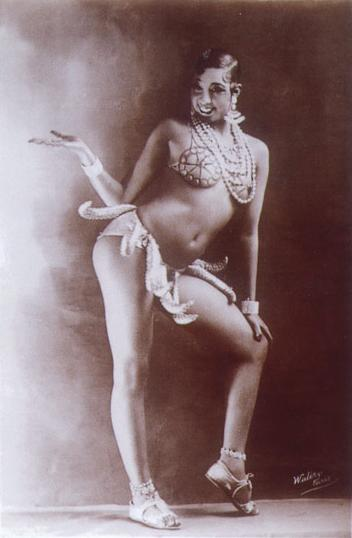
Josephine Baker in her famous skirt of bananas during her performance in La Folie du jour

The word negrophilia is derived from the French négrophilie that means "love of the Negro". It was a term that avant-garde artists used among themselves to describe their fetishization of Black cultures. Its origins were concurrent with art movements such as surrealism and Dadaism in the late 19th century. Sources of inspiration were inanimate African art objects (l'art nègre) such as masks and wooden carvings that found their way into Paris's flea markets and galleries alike as a result of colonial looting of Bantu Africa, and which inspired artworks such as Picasso's Les Demoiselles d'Avignon, as well as live performances by Black people, many of whom were ex-soldiers remaining in European cities after World War I, who entertained as a source of low income. Equally of interest to avant-garde creators were live arts such as dance, music and theatrical performances by Black artists, as evidenced by the popularity of comic artist Chocolat and the musical review Les Heureux nègres (1902).

== Factors/ideas influencing the emergence of negrophilia ==
What began as an artistic interest grew to a society-wide, mass fetish in France in the aftermath of World War I, during which an entire generation of youth was lost, which was later described in French as La Génération du feu, or "the (gun)fire generation". The violence and loss witnessed in Europe, in particular in France, by those who survived, challenged the belief in the superiority of Western civilization fostered during the age of Enlightenment, which also fueled questions on the exploitative effects of colonialism. French society was looking for alternative ideologies, and the exotic, "primitive" cultures of French colonies, erstwhile and current, were seen as alternatives to cold capitalism and modernity.

The post-war ideological vacuum thus fed off of earlier artistic movements centered around primitivism. This cultural shift was further shaped by the Lost Generation, a literary and artistic movement of American expatriates disillusioned by World War I. Among them, an influential African-American artistic community flourished, with figures such as Langston Hughes (helped to inspire the Négritude movement), Joséphine Baker, and Duke Ellington playing pivotal roles in the cultural evolution of France, most notably through the introduction of jazz. The U.S. Army 369th Harlem Hellfighters Regimental Band, led by James Reese Europe, was instrumental in exposing European audiences to African-American music, with its blend of ragtime and early jazz.

Simultaneously, the arrival of numerous African and African-American soldiers during the war years, their subsequent decision to return to or remain in post-war France, as well as numerous incoming artists, students, writers and professionals of color seeking accepting ground for themselves and their work, were significant contributors to the pervasiveness of Negrophilia in French society.

Negrophilia was never really about the Negro but about France, its needs, its wants and desires.

— T. Denean Sharpley-Whiting

== Significant personalities emerging from Les années folles ==
This fetishization of foreign cultures had already been established within France due to the regular expositions the country held to showcase the objects and people of the French colonies. The fascination with specifically black culture and the "primitivised" existence associated with it flourished in the combined aftermath of the First World War (1914–1918) and the 1931 Colonial Exposition when artists yearned for a "simpler, idyllic lifestyle to counter modern life's mechanistic violence." Yet to advertise the Colonial Exposition, the organizers relied on "racist imagery" in a children's comic book in the form of a character, Nénufar, who personified the savage with child-like curiosity, not the colonized oppressed peoples. Pictured with "steel wool hair" and practically naked except for a loincloth, cuffs and gloves on his feet, he appears to be aiming for but failing at assimilation.

Avant-garde artists recognised for their negrophilia interests include poet and art critic Guillaume Apollinaire, artists Jean Cocteau, Tristan Tzara, Man Ray, Paul Colin, surrealists Georges Bataille and Michel Leiris, and political activist Nancy Cunard. During 1920–1930s Paris, negrophilia was a craze to collect African art, to listen to jazz, and to dance the Charleston, the Lindy Hop or the Black Bottom, which were signs of being modern and fashionable. Perhaps the most popular revue and entertainer during this time was La Revue nègre (1925) starring Josephine Baker.

=== Josephine Baker ===
Regarding Baker and her style of dancing, a literary critic at the time, Gerard Bauër, called this the dawning of the romanticism of "couleur" (meaning "color"), as opposed to "exoticism", because romanticism was felt by the heart, and was not just a scientific inquiry. Bauër, the biological (but illegitimate) grandson of the author Alexandre Dumas père (his father Henry was born of an extramarital relationship), was a prolific author and chronicler in Paris, and would later become a member of the Académie Goncourt and the Société des gens des lettres (Society of Persons of Letters), which defended the rights of authors. As he described it, the animal-like intensity of Josephine Baker's dancing, for example, transported the viewer to a new state of feeling and not just curiosity. In addition to her color and near complete nudity, what elicited these feelings were Ms. Baker's movements—near perpetual trembling, her body extended like a serpent with elements of a contortionist, and ending on all fours with her head on the stage and her derrière in the air. Similarly, the African bamboula dance was described as a "frenzy" of noise and movement where one loses oneself, and where the dance becomes nearly an act of sexual intercourse.

== Significant pieces ==
- La Revue nègre
- La Folie du jour

== The bal nègre ==
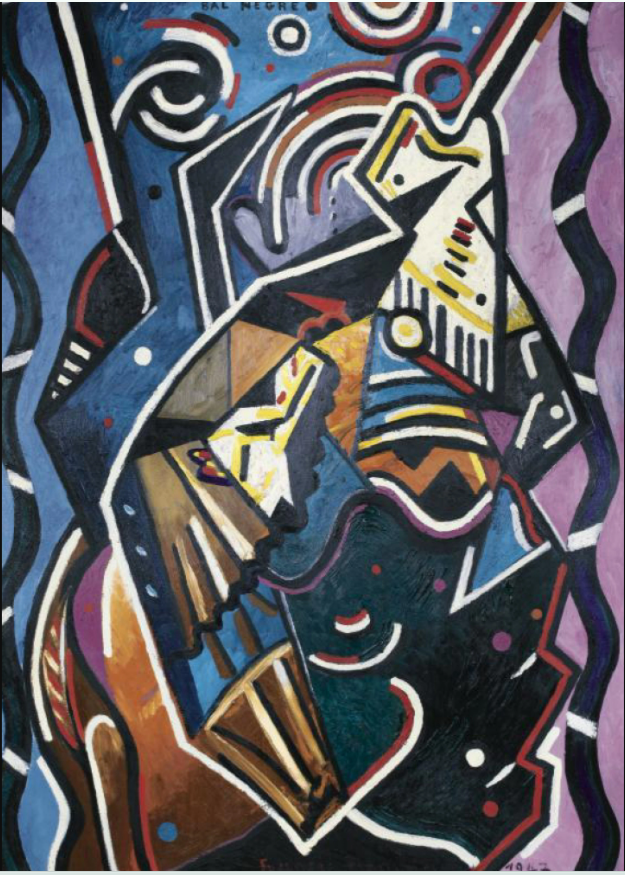
Black dance, Francis Picabia, oil on wood (1947)

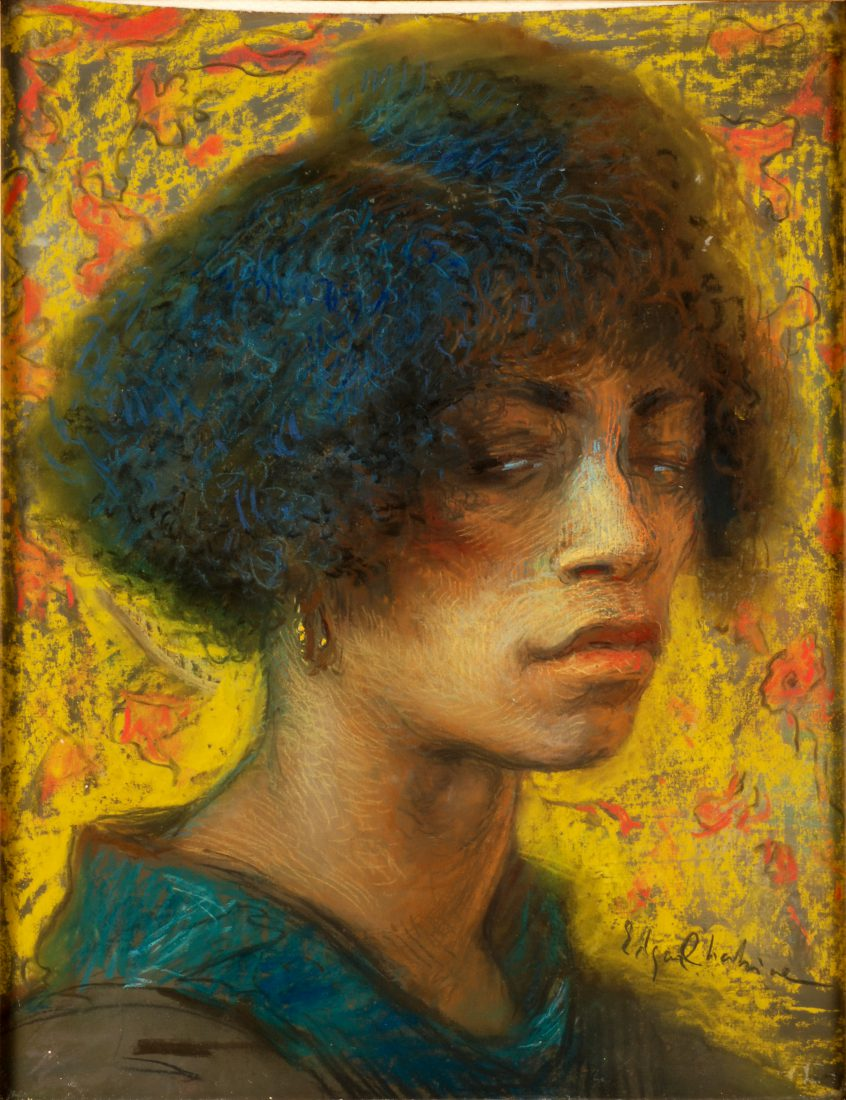
Portrait of Aïcha, Edgar Chahine (c. 1920), Paris, Armenian Museum of France. Model from Montparnasse, Aïcha Goblet.

Due to World War I, France saw an influx of African colonials migrate into Paris. This sudden rise, while extremely small by contemporary standards in diversity led white Parisians to become fascinated by the introduction and immersion of black cultures in the city. During the late 1920s, several Parisian nightclubs began hosting balls, or African-inspired dances, which were very popular among both the black and white French crowds. These became one of the leading interracial social spaces in France.

While African immigrants went to a bal colonial, or bal nègre, for recreation and fun, French surrealists often came for the artistic observation of black culture. The jazz music and dancing found in black nightclubs were studied by surrealists as major components of black civilization. This appreciation of the night lifestyle of Black Africans and African Americans in France was really the French sexualizing and fetishizing black culture. The bals were also one of the most prominent areas for interracial exchanges and relationships to occur. Hidden in the dark of night, young French and African adults could socialize and interact in ways that were highly controversial in average European society.

To the average Frenchman, the bal nègre was considered an opportunity for "exotic" experiences and sexual freedom. Black party-goers were no longer thought to be in these bals for their own enjoyment, but for the interests of white guests. As the appeal of exoticism rose, the opportunity for white people to interact and dance with black people became very attractive. This promise of "exotic experimentation" made these nightclubs very popular with the French bourgeois and turned them into tourist attractions. Interracial dancing gave the French a sense of liberation from the conventions of modern society, especially since the French deemed Africa and Africans primitive and passionate. These "progressive" interracial relations did not surpass the walls of the Parisian nightclubs. The racial and social structures remained unchanged for Blacks and whites in France during the early 20th century.

== Concurrent movements and opposing ideas ==
- Negrophilia was a metropolitan movement that also elicited opposition from parts of French society. The combination of African primitive music and American popular culture through presentations such as La Revue nègre, was a threat to refined French tastes. Not all Parisians welcomed incoming foreigners in the inter-war years – they were seen as competition for employment opportunities in a recovering economy, nor was Paris free from racism.
- Dissenting voices were strengthening in the French colonies. An example is the formation of the Association Panafricaine in 1921 post the Pan-African Congress. Soldiers from French colonies who fought on behalf of France during the Great War were voicing demands for citizenship and equality, challenging French colonial power.

== Negrophilia today – cultural appropriation ==
Negrophilia and the fetishization of Black faces, bodies, arts, music and dance that were its manifestations, have been criticized for objectifying, sexualizing and ultimately trivializing peoples of so-called "primitive" or "exotic" cultures, in a process of racial "othering". The fetishization and selective exploitation of Black physical traits, hair, manner of dress and cultural attributes can be seen in contemporary social media, electronic media and public life, by celebrities as well as people seeking celebrity status. The contemporary phenomena of cultural appropriation and Blackfishing can be called the modern iterations of Negrophilia. Members of the dominant social group, in this case White persons, either adopt - without acknowledgement- certain customs, mannerisms etc. of people of African origin, or in some cases, give themselves a completely different racial identity. The objectives are varied: gaining attention, rebuilding a celebrity image, marketing and business interests. Several public figures from across domains have, in the recent past, been identified for this commodification of Black identity, including Kim Kardashian, Eminem, Ariana Grande and Rachel Dolezal.

== See also ==
- Afrophobia
- Blackface
- Négritude
- Negrophobia
- Orientalism
- Othering
- Primitivism
- Racial fetishism

== Sources ==
- Petrine Archer-Straw, Avant-Garde Paris and Black Culture in the 1920s (2000)
- Michel Fabre, From Harlem to Paris (1991)
- Tyler Stovall, Paris Noir: African Americans in the City of Light (1996)
