= Jean-Christophe Balouet =

French paleontologist and ornithologist (1956–2021)

Jean-Christophe Balouet (12 November 1956 − 31 March 2021) was a French palaeontologist. He has collaborated extensively with Storrs Olson of the Smithsonian Institution on palaeornithological research on the extinct birds of New Caledonia in the south-west Pacific region.

== Education ==
Jean-Christophe attended University Paris at La Sorbonne University (Jussieu) he obtained a Degree in Advanced Studies in 1982; and a Doctorate in 1984. He was a postdoctorate scientist at the Smithsonian Institution in 1986, and a research scientist in the National Museum of Natural History, Paris.

== Environmental projects ==
Jean-Christophe worked with Jacques Cousteau on Calypso and later was founder and manager of the Clinic for Oiled Sea Birds from 1978 supertanker wreck Amoco Cadiz.

From 1989 to 1994 he worked as a consultant for the United Nations Environment Program (UNEP) Industry Technology and Economics Office, in charge of technology, scientific and regulatory surveys worldwide. He was editor of the OzonAction, an international newsletter where he collaborated with over 1000 private and public parties.

From 1993 to 2021 Jean-Christophe was a manager at Environment International. The company specialized in environmental forensics, consultancy and expertise, science and technology, regulations and standards, surveys, analysis, compliance, anticipation and management issues in various industries. The company dealt with pollution events, environmental impact, occupational and public exposures to the environment. Jean-Christophe was an expert witness in international legal cases and governmental enquiries (USA, Europe, Australia).

== Aerotoxic syndrome ==
USAF Flight Surgeon Dr Harry Hoffman, Australian Toxicologist and French Forensic scientist Jean-Christophe Balouet's published after much international research, the term aerotoxic syndrome on 20 October 1999 to describe the acute and chronic human ill health caused by exposure to toxic oil fumes in most commercial jets. Jean-Christophe Balouet not only raised awareness of this public health issue but he was also instrumental in the decision to change the architecture of the Boeing 787 Dreamliner back to using electrically compressed 'outside' air, which is unique as this airplane does not use unfiltered, unmonitored ‘bleed air’ for cabin ventilation.

== Publications ==
Jean-Christophe Balouet authored 96 peer-reviewed publications and his works have been translated into many languages with him contributing to over 300 articles, 150 radio and 70 TV programs in 12 countries. He has participated in over 90 international meetings, delivered more than 50 presentations at international conferences, contributed to four international standards committees as chair and to three committees as a member.

- 1989 – Fossil Birds from Late Quaternary Deposits in New Caledonia (With Storrs Olson). Smithsonian Contributions to Zoology 469. Smithsonian Institution Press, Washington D.C.
- 1990 – Extinct species of the world: lessons for our future (With Eric Alibert). Letts: London. ISBN 978-1-85238-100-4
