= Alibert =

Alibert is a French surname. Notable people with the surname include:

- Éric Alibert (born 1958), French painter
- Gaston Alibert (1878–1917), French fencer
- Henri Alibert (1889–1951), French singer and actor
- Jean-Claude Alibert (died 2020), French racing driver
- Jean-Louis-Marc Alibert (1768–1837), French dermatologist
- Louis Alibert (1884–1959), French linguist
- Marguerite Alibert (1890–1971), French socialite
- Raphaël Alibert (1887–1963), French politician
- Thierry Alibert (born 1970), French rugby league referee
