= La Folie du jour =

1926 revue at the Folies Bergère in Paris

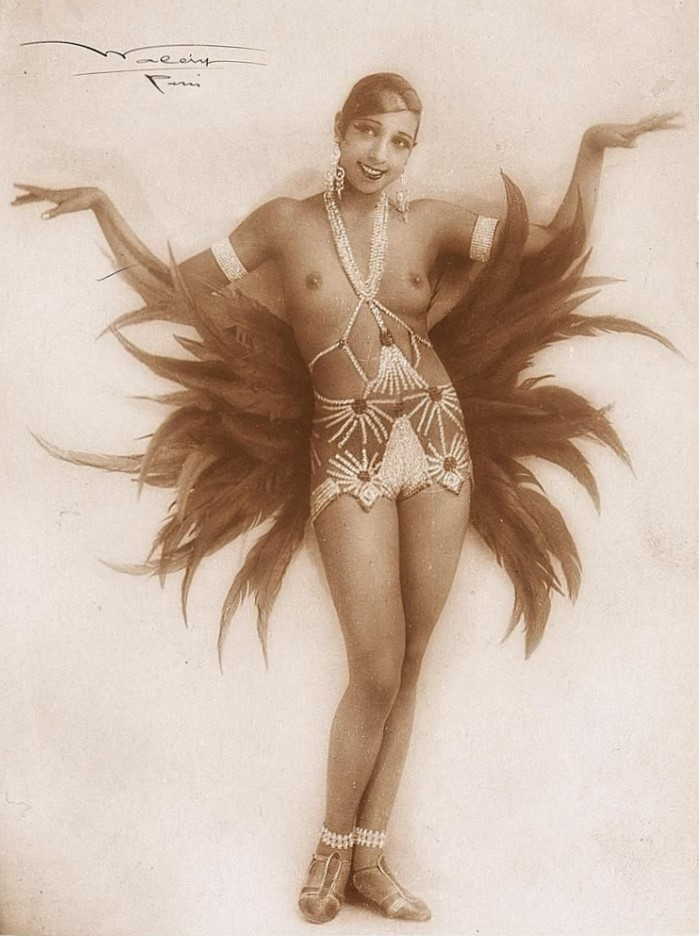
- Josephine Baker in feather costume. Photo by Lucien Waléry, c. 1927
- Music: Vincent Scotto and others, including Irving Berlin
- Lyrics: Louis Lemarchand
- Book: Louis Lemarchand
- Premiere: 24 April 1926: Folies Bergère, Paris

La Folie du jour (English: The Madness of the Day) was a revue presented at the Folies Bergère in Paris from 1926 to 1927. Written by Louis Lemarchand and produced under the direction of Paul Derval, it consisted of two acts and 45 tableaux. The production starred the American-born dancer Josephine Baker alongside Dorville, Alibert, Pépa Bonafé, and Féral Benga.

The production was an important stage in Baker's emergence as one of the best-known stars of the Parisian music-hall, following her success in La Revue nègre. She appeared in several of La Folie du jour's sketches, most famously performing her Banana Dance, in which she wore her iconic costume of a short skirt made from artificial bananas, which became one of her signature costume.

A separate silent film of the same title, drawing on the Folies Bergère production and directed by Joe Francis, was released in 1927.

== Production ==
=== Background ===
The revue was produced during Paul Derval's long directorship of the Folies Bergère. Derval had developed a distinctive style for the theatre, combining singing, comedy, individuals dancing, elaborate scenery and costumes with large ensembles of dancers, spectacular stage effects, and "tableaux" featuring nudity. His revues were written by Louis Lemarchand and were designed to present a succession of visually elaborate scenes rather than a continuous dramatic narrative.The title followed Derval's established practice of incorporating thirteen letters and the word folie or folies into the title of his revues.

After her success in Paris, Berlin and elsewhere in Continental Europe in La Revue nègre, Derval persuaded Josephine Baker to break her contract and move to the Folies Bergère as the star of his new production, La Folie du jour. The production's historical significance rests principally on Baker's performances. Derval's revues were among the large-scale spectacles that made the Folies Bergère one of the best-known Parisian music halls of the period.

Contemporary publicity described the production as a "hyper-revue", with Baker, Dorville, Pépa Bonafé and Alibert among its principal attractions. A programme published in March 1926, shortly before the production's first performance, identifies the production as "La Folie du jour, hyper-revue in two acts and 45 tableaux by Louis Lemarchand" (French: La Folie du jour, hyper-revue à grand spectacle en 2 actes et 45 tableaux de Louis Lemarchand). The revue drew on contemporary Parisian fascination with African and African-American performance. The production was inspired by Pierre Loti's novel The Romance of a Spahi (French: Le Roman d'un spahi), with several of its tableaux employing representations of an imagined "Black country" (French: "pays noir"), with Black performers accompanying the scenes with drums.

=== Premiere and run ===
The first performance took place at the Folies Bergère on 24 April 1926, and the revue was still being performed in early 1927, before Baker moved on to Derval's new revue Un Vent de folie. Photographs in the collection of the Société française de photographie document several tableaux at the Folies Bergère on 1 March 1927, including Les plus beaux éventails, Une fête à Versailles and the finale of the second act, Le Pactole. One of the photographs identifies Baker in the foreground of L'éventail de plumes. (Note: Société française de photographie documents the following photos of La Folie du jour: 806-PP-1684 – Les plus beaux éventails, Les plumes.; 806-PP-1692 – Les plus beaux éventails: L'éventail de plumes. Josephine Baker is identified in the foreground.; 806-PP-1693 – Les plus beaux éventails: L'éventail de diamant.; 806-PP-1695 – Une fête à Versailles (1662): Sur les marches de l'Orangerie.; 806-PP-562 – Finale of Act II: Le Pactole.) By late March 1927 the theatre was advertising Derval's successor revue, Un Vent de folie.

== Performers ==
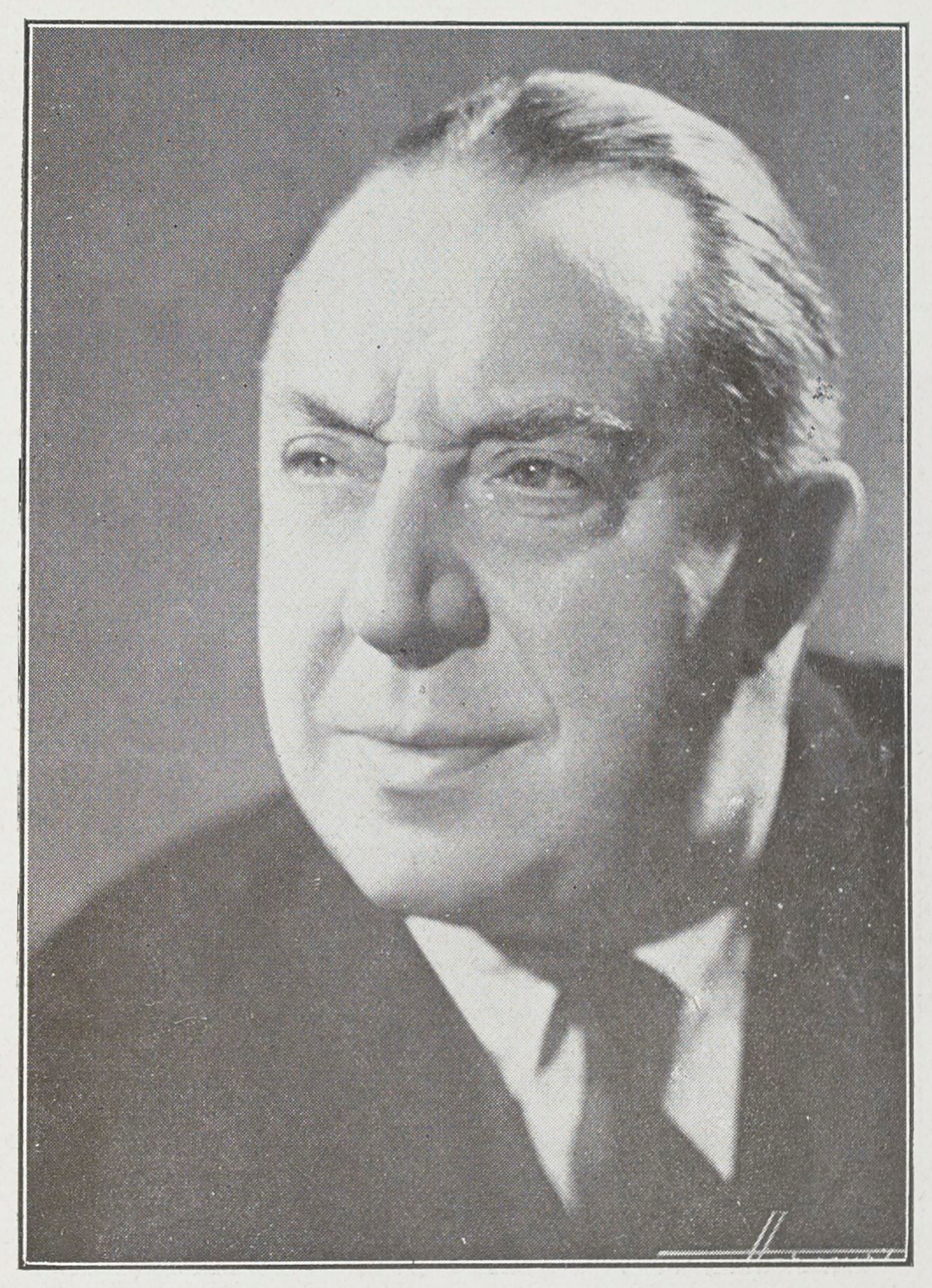
Dorville (Georges-Henri Dodane), 1938

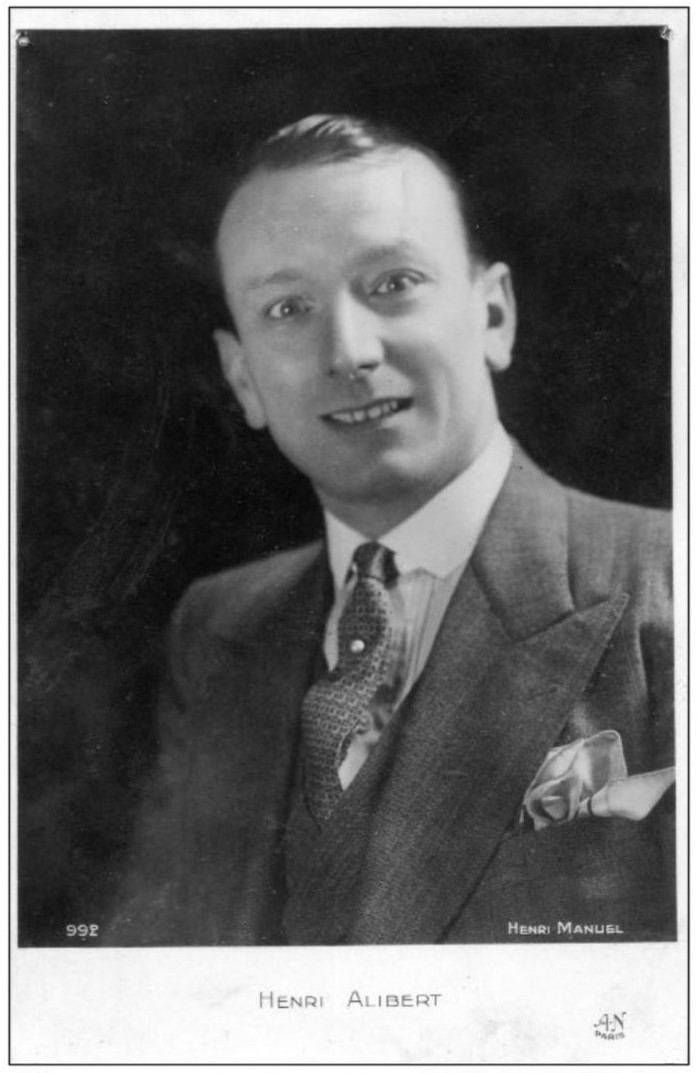
Alibert (Henri Alibert), date unknown

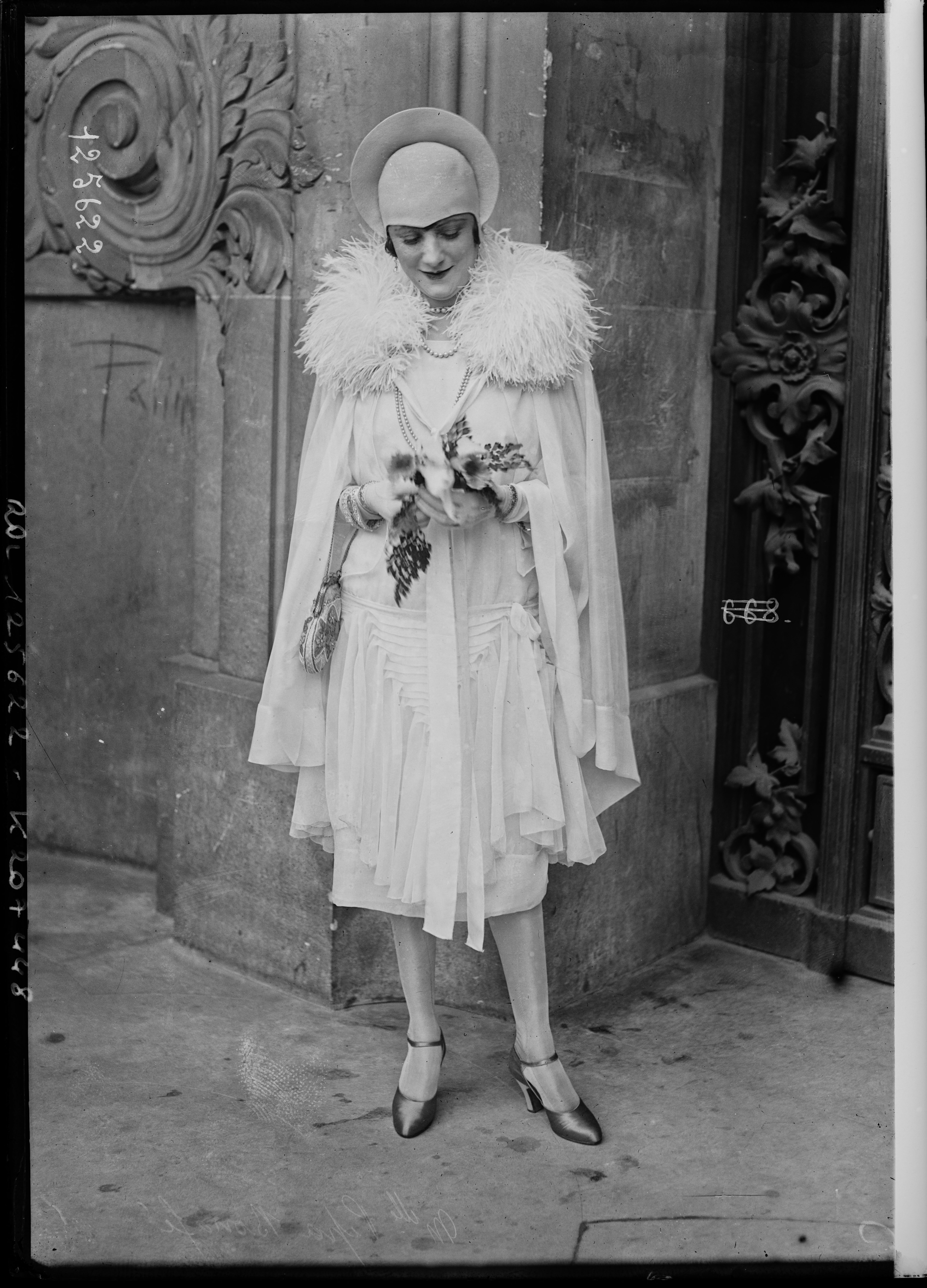
Pépa Bonafé, 1927

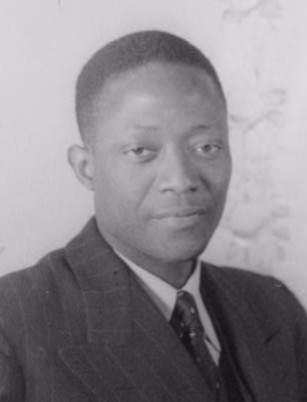
François "Féral" Benga, 1937

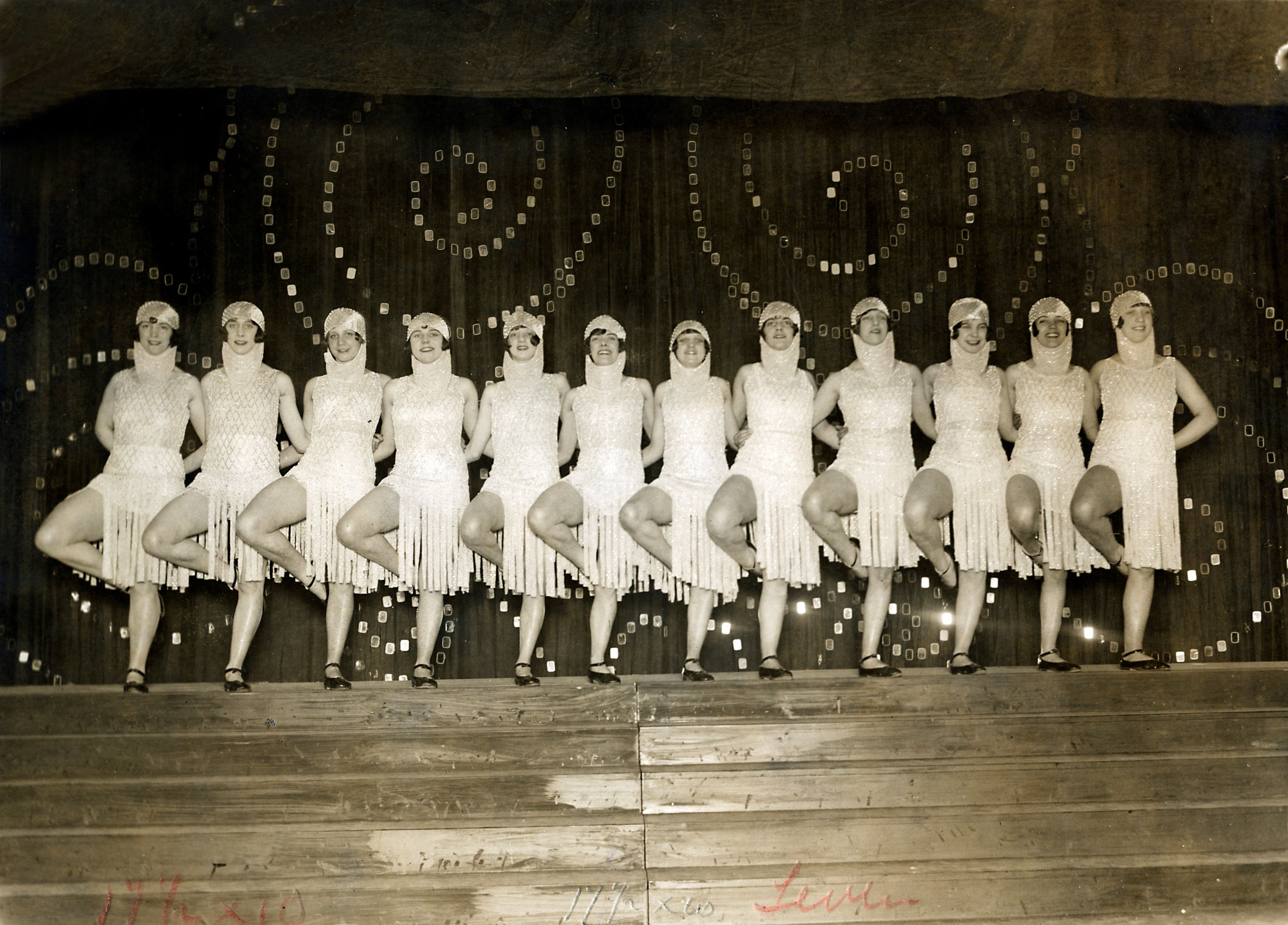
The Tiller Girls, 1926

=== Main performers ===
The revue's performers included:

- Josephine Baker
- Dorville, leading comedian and music-hall singer
- Alibert, singer and comedian
- Pépa Bonafé, music-hall performer and actress
- Féral Benga, Senegalese dancer
- Other members of the Folies Bergère company

A photograph from the Mary Evans Picture Library also shows the Tiller Girls, the British precision-dance troupe founded by John Tiller, in connection with the production.

=== Josephine Baker ===
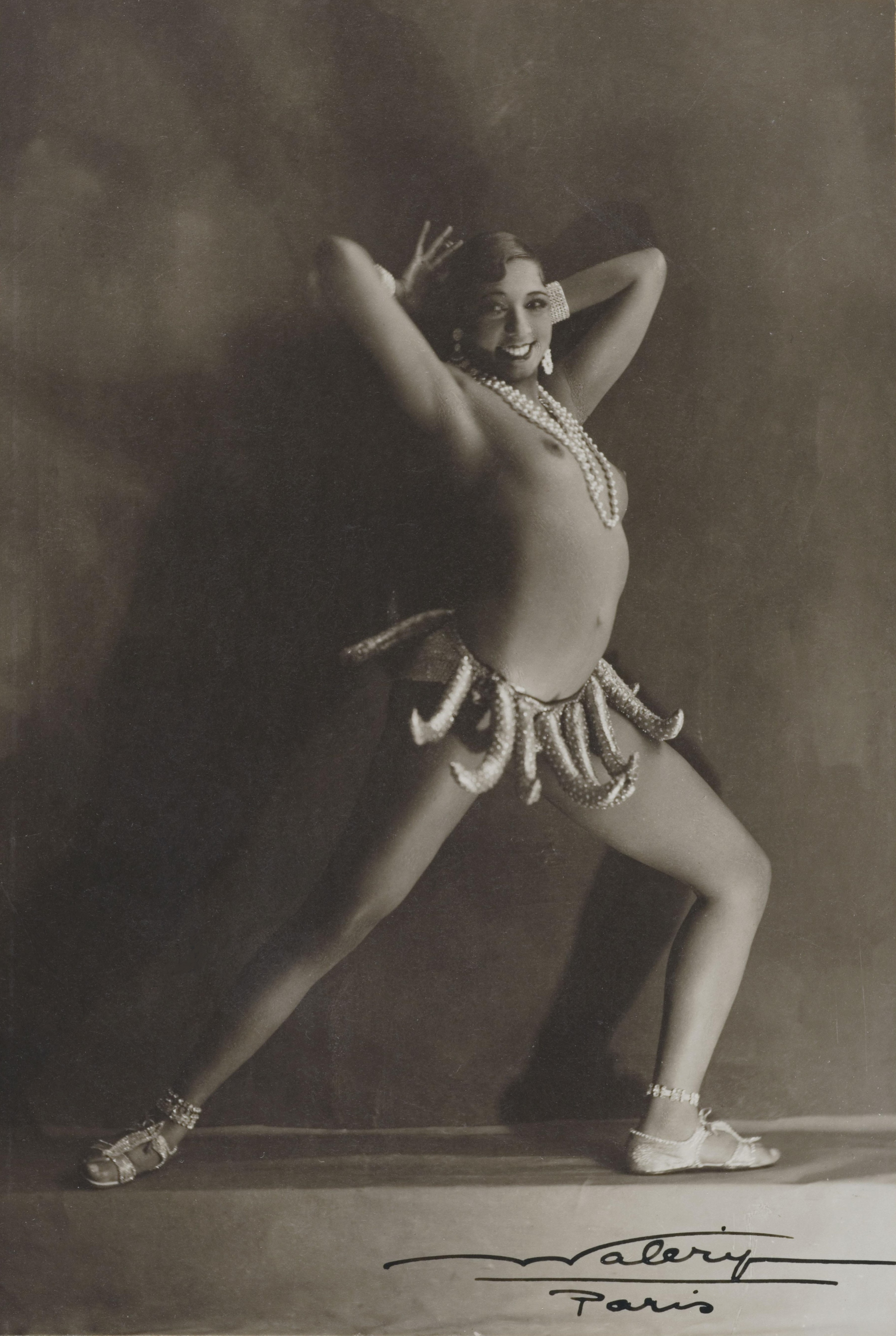
Josephine Baker, wearing her iconic banana skirt. Photo by Lucien Waléry, c. 1926

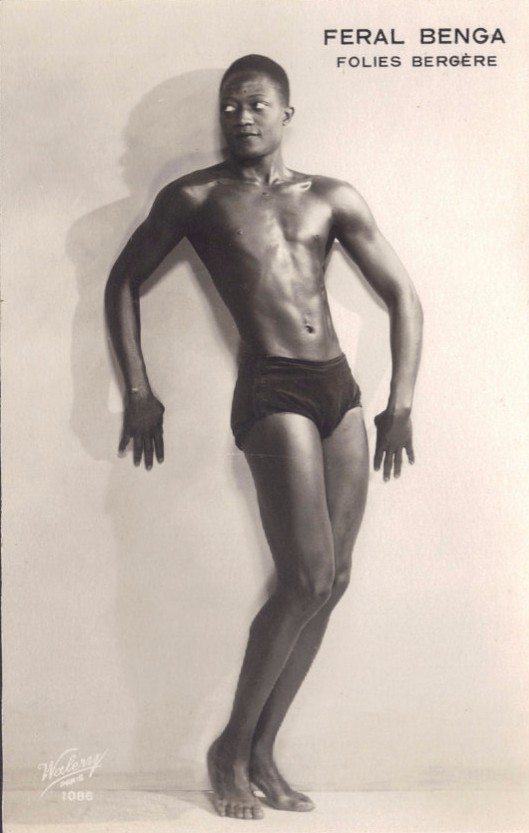
Postcard of Féral Benga at the Folies Bergère by Lucien Waléry, c. 1930

Photographs by Lucien Waléry published in the revue's official album show Baker dancing in one of her most famous numbers, her Banana Dance (French: Danse des bananes), in which she portrayed the character "Fatou". The costume associated with her performance consisted of little more than "strings of pearls, wrist cuffs, and a skirt with 16 rubber bananas", (Note: The idea for the banana skirt has been variously attributed to Jean Cocteau, or Paul Poiret, or Baker herself, or others.) and it remains one of the defining images of Baker's career. The costume and her performance contributed to the exoticised stage persona with which she became associated in interwar Paris.

The Banana Dance was only one element of Baker's role: the official album includes images of her in other spectacular tableaux, including "The Most Beautiful Fans" (French: Les plus beaux éventails), featuring an elaborate feather costume.

Derval's production combined Baker's dancing with elaborate stage machinery and visual effects. Another sketch, "The Ball of Flowers" (French: La Boule de fleurs) involved Baker appearing from within a large ball, lowered by stage machinery. In his account of the Folies Bergère, Derval later wrote that:

a huge ball, covered in flowers, slowly descended from the flies and came to rest amidst the musicians. The floral ball would split in two, revealing Josephine—almost naked—standing on a mirror. She would dance; then the ball would close again over the mirrored platform, and steel cables would slowly hoist it back up into the theatre's dome.

=== Féral Benga ===
The production also formed part of the growing presence of Black performers in Parisian music hall during the 1920s. Among those engaged was Féral Benga, a Senegalese dancer who had been encouraged to seek work in the music halls by French-African actor Habib Benglia. Benga was engaged at the Folies Bergère in 1926 for La Folie du jour.

== Songs and music ==
The programme and contemporary publicity mention the revue including songs and music by composers and songwriters such as Vincent Scotto, Irving Berlin, Maurice Hermite, and others.

Several numbers associated with the revue were published separately as sheet music. "Cupidon" was advertised as "The new hit from the Folies-Bergère spectacular revue La Folie du jour, while "Madame Oukoulili" was described as a "Hawaiian song sung by M. Tirmont and the Folies-Bergère quartet".

== Significance ==
La Folie du jour became closely identified with Baker and was an important stage in her successful transformation from a performer in La Revue nègre to becoming one of the best-known stars of the Parisian music hall. The production's combination of jazz-age dance, elaborate stage machinery, spectacular costumes and representations of racial and sexual exoticism epitomised several of the cultural currents associated with the Années folles.

The revue also occupies an important place in the history of the Folies Bergère itself. Derval's productions of the period were distinguished by their scale: Lemarchand supplied dozens of tableaux while Derval concentrated on scenery, costumes, machinery, choreography and the presentation of the performers. La Folie du jour was therefore not simply a vehicle for Baker but a large ensemble production in which the star's appearances were integrated into a succession of visual spectacles.

The contemporary reception was not uniformly enthusiastic. A review by A. de Montgon criticised the revue's reliance on nudity and exotic imagery. Jean Patin similarly reviewed the production in Le Figaro. The reviews illustrate contemporary debate over the revue's use of nudity and exotic imagery.

The production is extensively documented in surviving photographs. The Folies Bergère issued a substantial souvenir album, photographed principally by Waléry, containing images of performers and tableaux. Copies survive in institutional and private collections, while the Société française de photographie preserves photographs documenting individual scenes from the production.

== Films ==
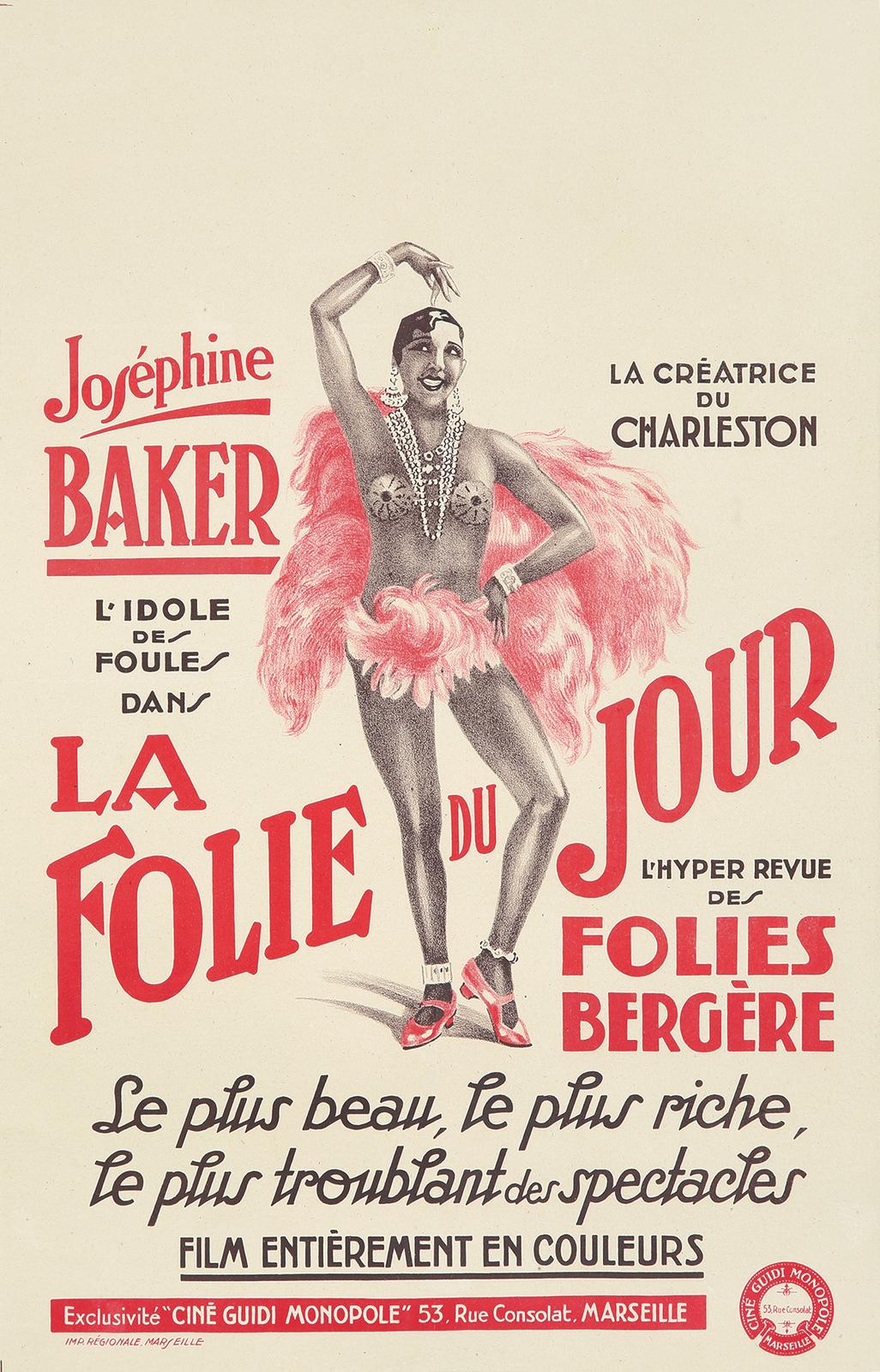
Poster promoting the colour film. It reads, "Joséphine Baker, the creator of the Charleston, the idol of the crowds, in La Folie du jour, the hyper revue at the Folies Bergère. The most beautiful, the richest, the most unsettling of spectacles. Film entirely in colour".

Film footage survives of Baker performing material from the revue. Performances were filmed in 1926 and 1927, usually with her dressed more modestly than on the Parisian stage.

- The Banana Dance (link to external media)
- Josephine Baker performs as "Fatou" in her Banana Dance. Gaumont Pathé Archives, 1926

La Revue des revues (1927)

=== La Folie du jour ===
A silent film titled La Folie du jour, directed by Joe Francis, was released in 1927, drawing on the Folies Bergère production and featuring Baker. The film does not document the stage production itself: the revue premiered in April 1926 and continued into 1927, whereas the film was a separate motion-picture production made from material associated with the spectacle. The cast list for the film is different from the cast of the stage production.

The distinction is important because surviving film material showing Baker's famous Banana Dance is sometimes catalogued simply as La Folie du jour. The dance footage is associated with the 1926 revue at the Folies Bergère, while the later feature-length film has its own production history. No complete copy of the film is known to exist.

=== Other surviving footage ===
==== The Banana Dance ====
The Gaumont Pathé Archives, Actuality Pathé collection holds a 1926 silent extract showing Baker performing as "Fatou" in her Banana Dance.

==== La Revue des revues ====
La Revue des revues (1927) is a hand-coloured feature-length silent film, directed by Joe Francis, and including two Baker dances, "Plantation Dance" (at 1:03:23) and "La Meme en 1927" (at 1:14:40). The Tiller Girls also appear, credited in the film as "The John Tiller's Folies Stars" (at 1:05:35, 1:08:12 and 1:20:31).

== See also ==
- Alibert
- Années folles
- Josephine Baker
- Féral Benga
- Folies Bergère
- La Revue nègre
- Tiller Girls

== Sources ==
- Baker, Jean-Claude; Chase, Chris (1993). Josephine: The Hungry Heart. New York: Cooper Square Press. ISBN 9780815411727.
- "Josephine Baker: A Century in the Spotlight". The Scholar & Feminist Online (6.1 – 6.2). Barnard Center for Research on Women. Fall 2007 – Spring 2008.
- Coutelet, Nathalie (2012). "Féral Benga: De la danse nègre à la chorégraphie africaine" [Féral Benga. From the Negro Dance to the African Choreography]. Cahiers d'études africaines (in French). 52 (205): 199–215. doi:10.4000/etudesafricaines.16995.
- Donald, James (2015). Some of These Days: Black Stars, Jazz Aesthetics, and Modernist Culture. Oxford University Press. ISBN 9780199354016.
- Ezra, Elizabeth (2000). The Colonial Unconscious: Race and Culture in Interwar France. Cornell University Press. ISBN 9780801486470.
- Sowinska, Alicja (2006). "Dialectics of the Banana Skirt: The Ambiguities of Josephine Baker's Self-Representation". Michigan Feminist Studies. 19. Ann Arbor, MI: MPublishing, University of Michigan Library.
- Théâtre des Folies-Bergère (1926). La revue des Folies-Bergère. Quatrième album, 1926–1927, La Folie du jour [The Folies Bergère Revue. Fourth Album, 1926–1927, La Folie du Jour] (in French). Paris: Éditions artistiques de Paris.
