= Ivanhoe Gambini =

Italian painter

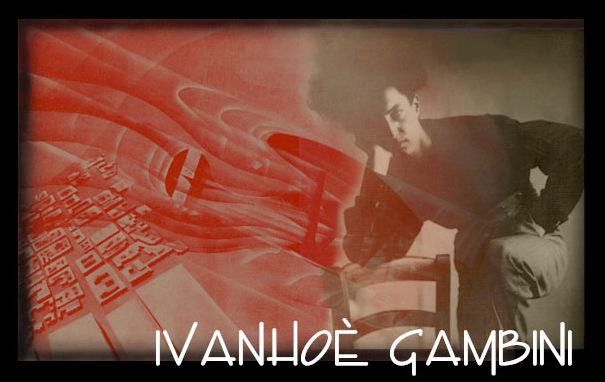
- Born: 25 March 1904; Busto Arsizio, Italy
- Died: 23 December 1992 (aged 88); Busto Arsizio, Italy
- Occupation: Painter

Ivanhoe Gambini (25 March 1904 – 23 December 1992) was an Italian painter. He was part of the futurism movement. His work was part of the painting event in the art competition at the 1936 Summer Olympics. He did not place in the final standings, nor was a gold medal awarded to any participant.
