= Jean-Claude Alibert =

French racing driver (died 2020)

- Died: 8 July 2020
- Occupation: Racecar Driver

Jean-Claude Alibert (died 8 July 2020) was a French amateur rally driver. He was a mechanic in Bisontin before competing in rally races from 1967 to 1995.

== Biography ==
Alibert had 45 starts, seven withdrawals, and 19 victories throughout his rally career. He officially retired in 2000.

He was the winner of the Coupe de France regional rallies in 1985 in Vichy and in 1990 in Cergy-Pontoise. In both victories, he raced in a Renault 5 Turbo. His other victories include the 1981, 1983, 1984, 1985, 1986, 1987, 1988, 1989, and 1990 Rallye du Brionnais, the 1990, 1993, and 1995 Rallye de la Côte Chalonnaise, and the 1990 Rallye des Lacs, of which he came in 2nd in 1995.

Alibert's Renault 5 Turbo was auctioned off in 2015 by Bonhams at the Grand Palais in Paris. Jean-Claude Alibert died on 8 July 2020.
