= La Revue Nègre =

1925 Paris revue starring Josephine Baker

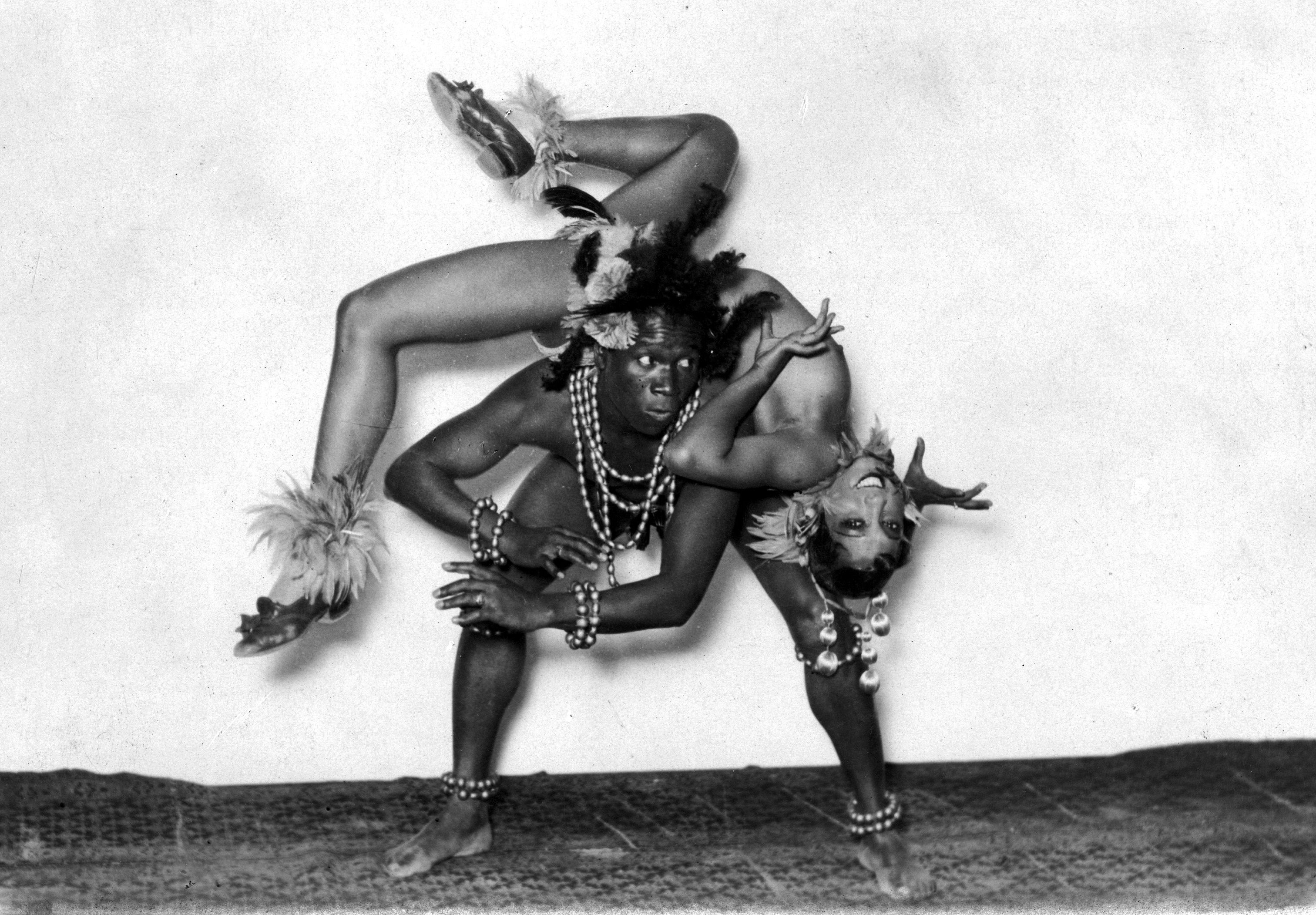
Josephine Baker, wearing only a feathered skirt and anklets, shoes, and a headdress, arches back over the forward-bent fr:Joe Alex in La Danse sauvage.

La Revue nègre (Note: Typographically, both La Revue nègre and La Revue Nègre are used.) (French: The Negro Revue) was a revue first performed in 1925 at the Théâtre des Champs-Élysées in Paris, and which then toured Europe. Its cast included Josephine Baker in her first performance in France. Through its success and the personality of Baker, who was its rising star, it encouraged a wider diffusion of jazz music and Black culture in Europe.

== "Negrophilia" ==
The creation of La Revue nègre is linked to the adoption in France of jazz music, which arrived in Paris a few months before the end of the First World War via jazz bands composed of American soldiers. Jazz influenced musicians such as Igor Stravinsky (Ragtime for Eleven Instruments (1917–18), chamber music, and Ragtime (1919) for piano solo), poets such as Jean Cocteau, Guillaume Apollinaire and Blaise Cendrars, and painters, before spreading to Parisian dance halls through the fashion for the Charleston dance. Other influences included Dixieland Jazz. At the same time, at the beginning of the 1920s, music hall and cabaret shows were becoming available to a wider public.

From 10 to 31 May 1919, the first "Exhibition of Black Art and Oceanic Art" was presented at the Devambez–Paul Guillaume Gallery located at 45, boulevard Malesherbes. Paul Guillaume then organised a "Black Festival" at the Théâtre des Champs-Élysées, which left its mark on André Daven, artistic director of the theatre. Also, in 1921, the Prix Goncourt was awarded to Martinique's René Maran for Batouala, a novel about an African chieftain.

By the early 1920s, "negrophilia" had emerged in France. Separately, the Exposition internationale des arts décoratifs et industriels modernes (International Exhibition of Modern Decorative and Industrial Arts) was held from 29 April to 8 November 1925, displaying thousands of designs including a major display of African culture. A promotional poster showed a dancing woman with a black gazelle in the background.

La Revue nègre was part of this context of so-called "black madness", both its product and also an instrument which would amplify it.

== La Revue nègre ==
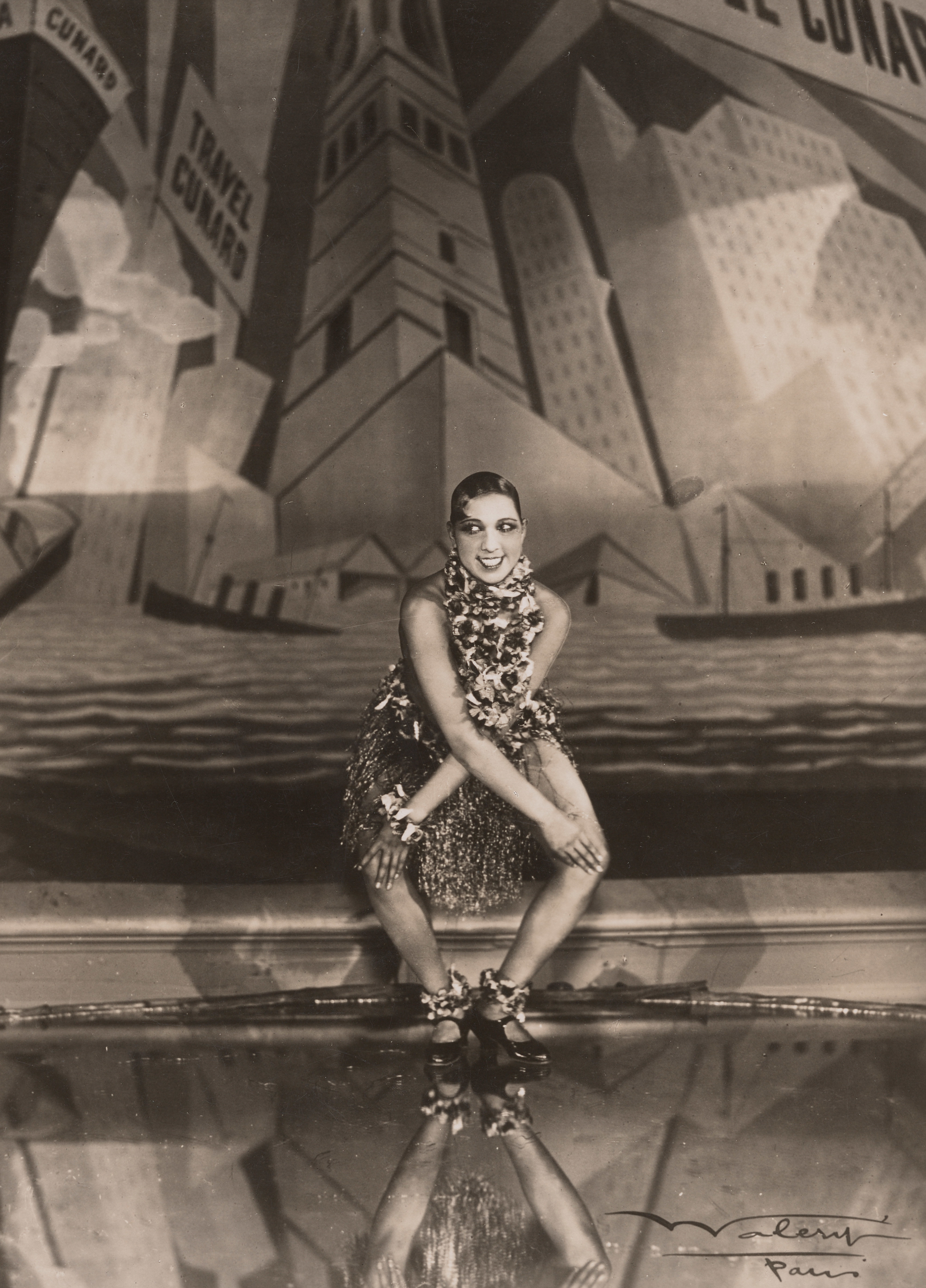
Baker dancing the Charleston, in the silent film La Folie du jour (1927) of acts in the later revue of the same name, at the Folies Bergère, Paris

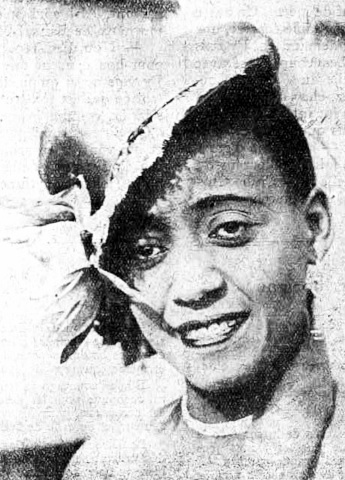
Maud de Forest in 1925. Her part was reduced shortly before the premiere.

The Théâtre des Champs-Élysées had hosted the world premiere in 1913 of the Ballets Russes' Rite of Spring, which provoked one of the most famous classical music riots. More recently, in October 1923, a Ballets suédois production, La Création du monde, had premiered at the Théâtre, with music by Darius Milhaud, based on Cendrars' L'Anthologie nègre, and with sets by Fernand Léger. in 1924, the Théâtre had premiered the Ballets Suédois' production of Francis Picabia's Relâche. However, the Théâtre's ownership had recently changed, it had financial difficulties and was now looking for a hit production. In 1925, André Daven, artistic director of the theatre, was having difficulty coming up with new ideas for performances and set out to find a new type of show. Fernand Léger suggested he create a show performed entirely by Black people. Léger, who had worked with the Ballets suédois, with mixed success, had long been influenced by African art, as had his acquaintances Apollinaire, Pablo Picasso, Max Jacob and some of the early surrealists.

Daven was approached by Caroline Dudley Reagan, an American socialite and impresario and married to the commercial attaché at the American embassy in Paris, Donald J. Reagan, and she suggested putting on a black revue similar to popular Broadway African American theatre productions such as Shuffle Along, Runnin' Wild and The Chocolate Dandies (whose chorus line had included Josephine Baker). Daven agreed, and Reagan set out to find a troupe in New York composed of Black people. She convinced twelve musicians and thirteen dancers to travel to and perform in France, including dancer Josephine Baker, clarinet player Sidney Bechet, blues singer Maud de Forest, composer Spencer Williams, pianist and jazz bandleader Claude Hopkins, dancer and choreographer Louis Douglas, artist Miguel Covarrubias (a friend of Reagan) as set designer, saxophonist Joe Hayman, trombonist Daniel Day, tuba player Bass Hill, and drummer Percy Johnson. Reagan saw great potential in Josephine Baker, and offered her a salary of $250 per week if she agreed to follow her to France. The show that was to be presented in Paris had already been successful on Broadway. (Note: The new show may have been based on one named Hotsy Totsy in the US.) Rehearsals began in New York, and continued during the transatlantic voyage on board the RMS Berengaria.

A week before opening night, selected critics were given a two-scene preview to arouse their interest and raise media interest. Initial responses were unenthusiastic, for the show was neither exotic enough nor erotic enough for contemporary Parisian audiences.

Only four days before the premiere, Daven, who was attending the rehearsals, decided to limit the part reserved for Maud de Forest, which was considered too "American blues", and to hire a new director, Jacques Charles, a renowned music hall specialist, to replace choreographer Louis Douglas, who nevertheless remained present in the troupe of dancers. The initial performance of the group of Black artists was deemed "not Negro enough" by the sponsors of the show. Jacques Charles selected Baker, from among the eight choristers called the "Charleston Babies", to appear in the final scene, which included a new piece entitled La Danse sauvage; 19-year-old Baker was asked to appear naked on stage. Initially outraged, (Note: Jacques Charles is quoted as saying, "I had already noticed her beautiful body, but to be honest, Josephine rejected my suggestion that she dance almost nude.") Baker resigned herself to performing topless, with a feather belt around her waist, (Note: Baker's famous "banana skirt" did not feature in La Revue nègre, but made its first appearance in the 1926 revue, La Folie du jour.) in keeping with the imagery of the African "noble savage" in vogue in the French colonial empire. Baker and the dancer-actor fr:Joe Alex were to perform an erotically suggestive duet added specifically for the new show.

The promotional poster was created by young poster artist Paul Colin, and helped launch his career.

The premiere of La Revue nègre took place on 2 October 1925. and lasted about three-quarters of an hour, being the second half of the evening's entertainment at the theatre. In the packed hall were Robert Desnos, Francis Picabia, Blaise Cendrars, Jean Cocteau and Darius Milhaud. The show was sold out.

The show consisted of an orchestral introduction followed by nine theatrical sketches, including Sidney Bechet playing a clarinet solo during a scene with a peanut vendor; "Louisiana Camp Meeting"; and a levee scene featuring the entire company, titled "Mississippi Steam Boat Race":

At the high point of the steamboat scene, Josephine Baker pounced onto the stage on all fours while beating time with the palms of her hands to the tune of "Boodle-am Shake", then started dancing the Charleston–bowing her legs, crossing her eyes, and emitting a high-pitched noise.

The finale, "Charleston Cabaret", set in a nightclub, showcased La Dance sauvage. Journalist Janet Flanner described the performance:

Josephine made her entry entirely nude except for a pink flamingo feather between her limbs; she was being carried upside down and doing the splits on the shoulder of a black giant. Mid stage he paused and, with his long fingers holding her basket-wise around the waist, swung her in a slow cartwheel to the stage floor, where she stood, in a moment of complete silence. A scream of salutation spread through the theatre.

Performance attendee and dance critic André Levinson said, "In the short pas de deux of the savages, which came as the finale of the Revue Nègre, there was a wild splendour and magnificent animality. The plastic sense of a race of sculptors came to life and the frenzy of African Eros swept over the audience. It was no longer a grotesque dancing girl that stood before them, but the black Venus that haunted Baudelaire." Anita Loos, who was not present, was more concise, later saying that Baker triumphed in Paris with "her witty rear end".

Baker's incarnation of the Black woman, erotic and wild, catering to the colonial stereotypes and fantasised exoticism of the French public of the 1920s, ensured La Revue nègre was an immediate success, and she became the toast of the city. The artistic spirit of the revue was unprecedented, mixing jazz-band music and original choreography, burlesque numbers, and scenography with mobile sets. The show constituted an event, in the sense that, on the one hand, it revealed for the first time in France a supposedly authentic "black culture" detached from colonialist burdens, and on the other hand, it allowed a popular genre to be exhibited in a place normally reserved for artistic experiences of the modernist type.

Richard J. Gray points out that, "as a result of the French colonial enterprise in Africa and the arrival of American black cultural forms, the black culture of Paris in the 1920s became an aesthetic combination of which dance reviews like "La Revue nègre" sought to take full advantage."

La Revue nègre moved to the Theatre de L’Étoile in November 1925. After it ended in Paris in December, the troupe significantly reorganised, with several members returning to the US, and a new troupe went on tour in Europe, with the addition of a tap dance by boxer "Panama" Al Brown. They gave more than one hundred performances, including in Brussels and Berlin, until late February 1926. Baker then broke her contract with Caroline Dudley Reagan. (Note: There are contradictory accounts of who replaced Baker, involving two dancers with the same surname: British dancer Josie Woods, who claimed to have appeared in La Revue nègre and taken Baker's part; and American dancer Marie Woods, who made the same claim and is named in the cast list, and there exists a photo of her 'dressed' in a costume very similar to Baker's for La Dance sauvage.) A week later, without its star attraction, the revue closed and the cast dispersed, with many of them having to find their way to back to the US as best they could. Reagan almost sued Baker, but eventually decided against it. Reagan's eventual divorce may have been caused by her husband's losing his savings on La Revue nègre.

Baker moved to a new revue, La Folie du jour, at the Folies Bergère theatre in Paris in September 1926, where she inaugurated her famous outfit of a "banana skirt".

== Bibliography ==
- Blake, Jody (1999). Le Tumulte noir: Modernist Art and Popular Entertainment in Jazz-Age Paris, 1900–1930. Pennsylvania State University Press. ISBN 978-0271017532.
- Colin, Paul; Gates, Henry Louis; Dalton, Karen C. C. (1 September 1998). Josephine Baker and La Revue Negre: Paul Colin's Lithographs of Le Tumulte Noir in Paris, 1927. Harry N. Abrams, Inc. ISBN 978-2911381386.
- Henderson, Mae G. (2003). "Josephine Baker and La Revue Negre: from ethnography to performance". Text and Performance Quarterly. 23 (2). doi:10.1080/1046293032000141338.
- Jordan, Matthew F. (15 August 2022). Le Jazz: Jazz and French Cultural Identity. University of Illinois Press. ISBN 9780252053870.
- Woodard, Jenna (May 2011). "Only the Negroes Can Excite Paris": Viewing Blackness in La Revue nègre (BA Music thesis). Des Moines, Illinois: Drake University.
