= Pavillon de l'Esprit Nouveau =

Model home designed by Le Corbusier and Pierre Jeanneret

- Location within Paris

General information
- Coordinates: 48.865633°N 2.311486°E
- Completed: 1925

Design and construction
- Architects: Le Corbusier, Pierre Jeanneret

Pavillon de l'Esprit Nouveau was a model home constructed for the 1925 International Exhibition of Modern Decorative and Industrial Arts in Paris, France. The building was designed by Swiss architects Le Corbusier and Pierre Jeanneret.

== Building ==
The Pavillon was conceived of as a modular dwelling that could be combined with others like it to form a larger block. The building measured 2,200 square feet (200 m^{2}) and utilized an open plan. A lower floor held living spaces and a kitchen while a second floor held bedrooms and a bathroom.

In designing the building, Le Corbusier and Jeanneret aesthetically and ideologically diverged from the Art Deco style which dominated the exhibition. The architects, viewing architecture as too removed from human needs, emphasized function and sought to drastically diminish decoration. In order to reduce the need for decorative furniture, Le Corbusier and Jeanneret included a myriad of built-in-furniture including cabinets and shelves. The pavilion also included several cubist sculptures by Jacques Lipchitz, one of which was placed on the grass in front of the building.

== Reconstruction ==
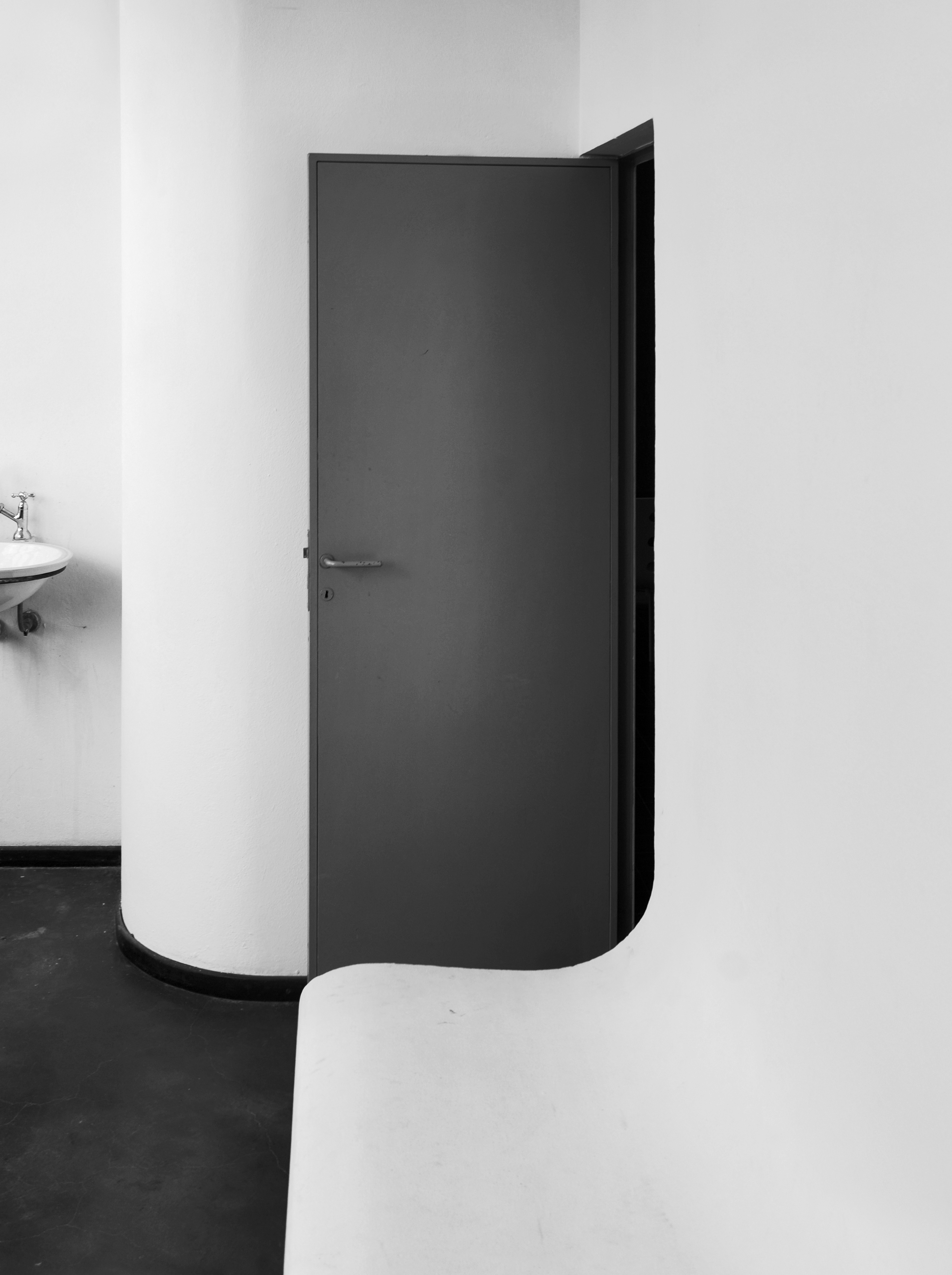
Interior of 1977 reconstruction

In 1977 Glauco Gresleri, Giuliano Gresleri and Jose Oubrerie constructed an exact replica of the building in Fiera District, Bologna, Italy for the SAIE construction exhibition. The architects completed the project in collaboration with the Fondation Le Corbusier.

The reconstructed pavilion was restored in 2017.

== Similar Projects ==
When Le Corbusier designed the Fruges housing Estate at Pessac near Bordeaux, the seven houses located at the west end of the site were designed to have similar characteristics as the Pavilion de L'Esprit Nouveau. Each house consists of a rectangular block separated from the adjoining house by a space equal to the size of the house. Thus we have an A-B-A-B-A-B pattern along the length of the road. What makes this pattern remarkable is the thin arched curved concrete roof which spans over the garden in the same way as the Pavilion has a garden with a hole in its roof to let the tree out.

== Reception ==
In a 2017 article for CNN, Stephen Bayley named the building one of "20 Designs That Defined the Modern World."
