= Éric Alibert =

French painter

Éric Alibert (born 1958) is a French painter, specialising in nature and animals. He is also the author of books dedicated to several important natural sites of the world.

== Style ==
He uses watercolour, oil, acrylic as well as other techniques including the use of gold leaves.

== Works ==
His works are inspired by regions such as the main European national parks, as well as Syria, Namibia, Venezuela and Japan. There is also an influence of poetic sources, such as Philippe Jaccottet, Novalis and Marguerite Yourcenar and of plastic artists like Soulages, Viollet-le-Duc and Rembrandt Bugatti, to whom Alibert dedicated a short film on YouTube.

Éric Alibert received the gold medal of the "artistes animaliers français ((ref.)), has been awarded by the Fondation de la Vocation and is member of the U.S. Guild of Natural Science Illustrators.

His works have been displayed in several exhibitions, including in the Museum d'histoire naturelle of Paris and of Geneva. There are owned by private and public collections. In 2012, the Castle of Saint-Maurice, Valais, Switzerland organises an important exposition of his most recent creations : Exhibition "Regards croisés Orient-Occident autour d'Eric Alibert"

== Publications ==
- Voyage d'un peintre autour du Mont-Blanc, éditions Slatkine, 2011
- Nature souveraine - Le Parc national suisse, with Pierre Rouyer, éditions du Midi, 2008, 176 p.
- Couleurs du Venezuela. Des Caraïbes à l'Orénoque, bilingual French-Spanish, éditions Somogy, 2007, 173 p.
- Carnet d'un naturaliste amateur en Lubéron, with Serge Bec, 2007, 125 p.
- Parc naturel régional des Monts d'Ardèche, with and audio-DC, 2007
- Namibie: De l'Okavango aux chutes Victoria. Carnet de voyages dans le Caprivi, éditions Slatkine, 2006, 178 p.
- Archipel des Cyclades, with François Arvanitis, Jacques Anglès & Anne-Sophie Bourhis-Pozzoli, éditions Nathan, 2005
- Couleurs de Syrie, éditions Somogy, 2004, 150 p.
- Parc naturel régional du massif des Bauges, éditions Gallimard Loisirs, 2001
- Léman mon île, éditions Slatkine, 2000
- Carnets Naturalistes en Provence, éditions Nathan, 2000
- La Cote d'Opale, éditions Gallimard, 1998
- Carnets Naturalistes autour du Mont Blanc, with Daniel Aiagno & Jean-François Desmet, éditions Nathan 1996
- Guide du jeune naturaliste à la montagne, éditions Delachaux et Niestlé, 1993
- Le grand livre des espèces disparues, with Jean-Christophe Balouet, foreword by Jacques-Yves Cousteau, éditions Ouest-France, 1989, 197 p.
