= Georgius =

Georgius is a masculine given name, the Latinized form of the Greek name Γεώργιος Georgios; its English equivalent is George. It's commonly used to refer to Saint George, a Roman soldier of Cappadocian Greek origin who became a Christian Saint.

Notable people with the name include:

- Georgius Agricola (1494–1555), German scholar and scientist considered the 'father of mineralogy'
- Georgius Baglivus Armenius, Latin name of Giorgio Baglivi (1668–1707), Croatian-Italian physician and scientist
- Georgius Calafattus, Latin name of Georgios Kalafatis (professor) (c. 1652–c. 1720), Greek professor of medicine
- Georgius Calixtus (1586–1656), German Lutheran theologian
- Georgius Candidius (1597–1647), Dutch Reformed Church missionary to Dutch Formosa
- Georgius Y. Cannon (1892–1987), American architect
- Georgius Choeroboscus, Latin name of George Choiroboskos, early 9th-century Byzantine Greek grammarian and deacon
- Georgius Chrysococca (fl. 1340s), Byzantine Greek physician, geographer and astronomer
- Georgius Constantine, an alternate of Captain George Costentenus (1833–1894 or later), Greek circus performer tattooed over his entire body
- Georgius Drohobich and Georgius Drohobicz, Latin and Polish names, respectively, of Yuriy Drohobych (1450–1494), Ruthenian philosopher, astronomer, writer, doctor, rector of the University of Bologna, professor of Kraków Academy and the first publisher of a Church Slavonic printed text
- Georgius Fabricius Chemnicensis, Latin name of Georg Fabricius (1516–1571), Protestant German poet, historian and archaeologist
- Georgius Zothorus Zaparus Fendulus, author/compiler active during the second half of the 12th century
- Georgius van Gent, alternate spelling of Jooris van der Straeten (fl. 1552–1577), Flemish painter
- Georgius Florentius, birth name of Gregory of Tours (c. 538–594), Gallo-Roman historian and Bishop of Tours
- Georgius Hornius (1620–1670), German historian and geographer
- Georgius Lauer, late fifteenth century German printer
- Georgius Merula (c. 1430–1494), Italian humanist and classical scholar
- Georg(ius) Mohr, Latin name of Georg Mohr (1640–1697), Danish mathematician
- Georgius Nigrinus (fl. 1571/72–1606), a printer in Prague
- Georgius Pauli-Stravius (1593–1640), Roman Catholic prelate, Auxiliary Bishop of Cologne and Titular Bishop of Ioppe
- Georgius Pelino (fl. 1438–1463), Catholic priest, abbot and diplomat
- Georgius Perpignani (1555–1621), Roman Catholic prelate, Bishop of Canea and Bishop of Tinos
- Georgius Pisides, Latinized name of George of Pisidia, early 7th century Byzantine Greek poet
- Georgius Prochaska, alternate spelling of Georg Prochaska (1749–1820), Czech-Austrian anatomist, ophthalmologist, physiologist, writer and university professor
- Georgius Sablocius, Latin name of Jurgis Zablockis (died 1563), one of the first known writers in the Lithuanian language
- Georgius Benignus de Salviatis, Latin name of Juraj Dragišić (c. 1445–1520), Bosnian Franciscan theologian and philosopher
- Georgius Syncellus (died after 810), Byzantine Greek chronicler and ecclesiastical official
- Georgius Tranoscius, Latin name of Jiří Třanovský (1592–1637), Lutheran priest and hymnwriter
- Georgius Tzul, Khazar warlord against whom the Byzantine Empire and Mstislav of Tmutarakan launched a joint expedition in 1016
- Georgius Valla, Latin name of Giorgio Valla (1447–1500), Italian academic, mathematician, philologist and translator

== See also ==
- George (disambiguation)
