= Mercure (ballet) =

1924 ballet composed by Erik Satie

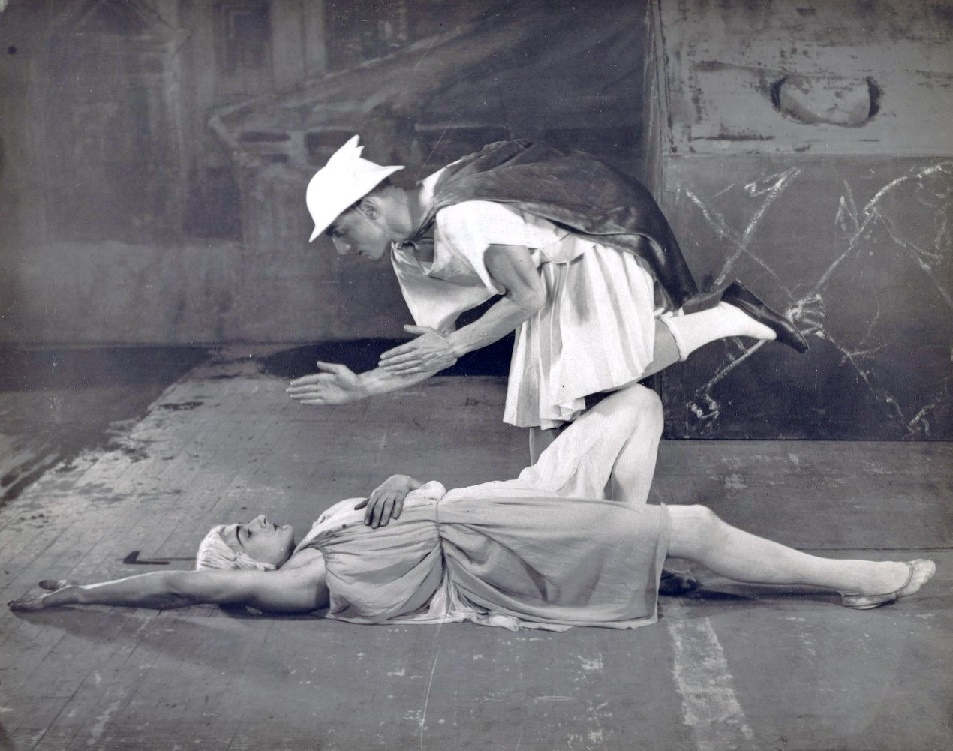
Mercury (Léonide Massine) slays Apollo (Boris Lisanevich) in the 1927 London revival of Mercure

Mercure (Mercury, or The Adventures of Mercury) is a 1924 ballet with music by Erik Satie. The original décor and costumes were designed by Pablo Picasso and the choreography was by Léonide Massine, who also danced the title role. Subtitled "Plastic Poses in Three Tableaux", it was an important link between Picasso's Neoclassical and Surrealist phases and has been described as a "painter's ballet".

Mercure was commissioned by the Soirées de Paris stage company and first performed at the Théâtre de la Cigale in Paris on June 15, 1924. The conductor was Roger Désormière.

== Background ==
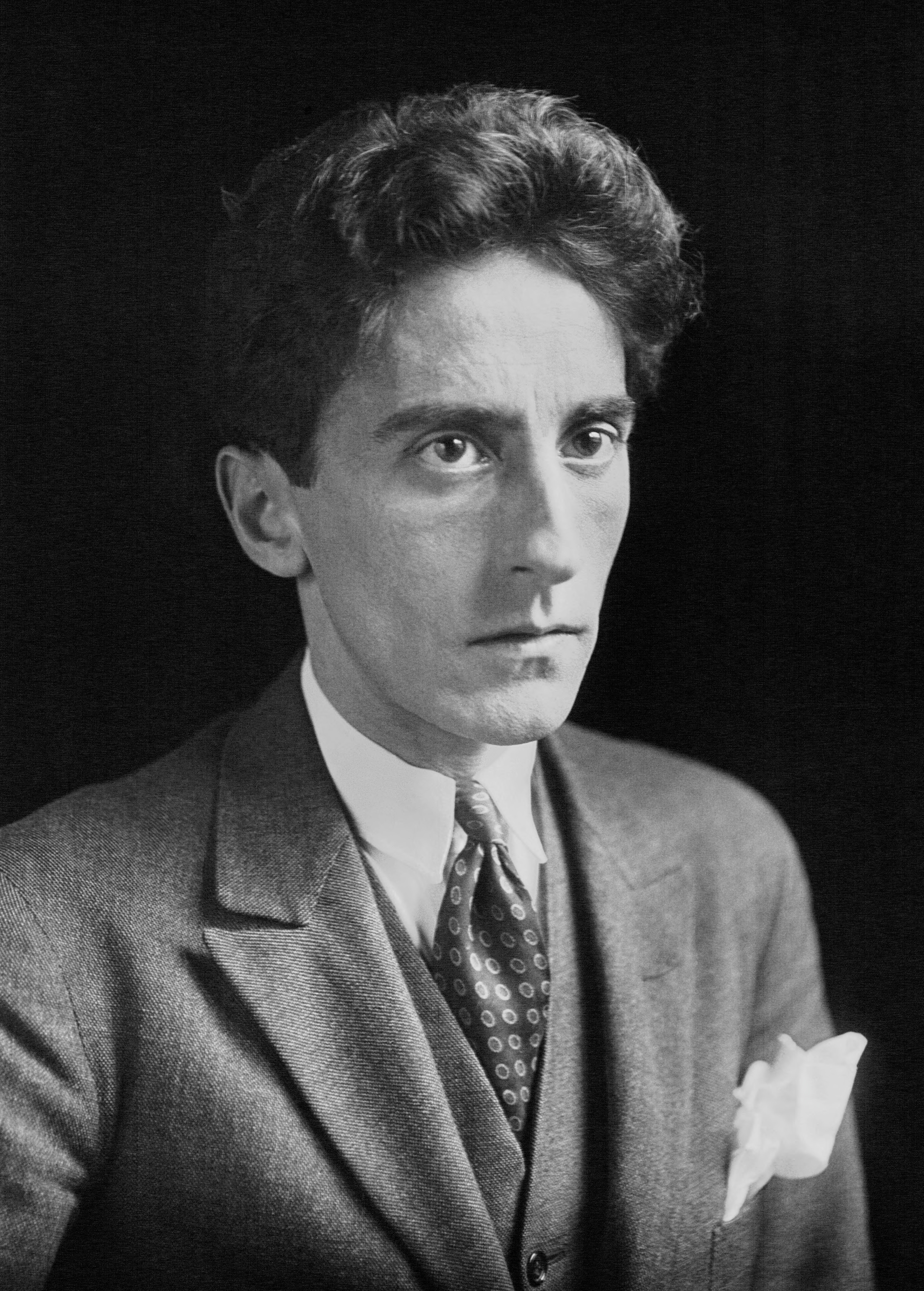
Jean Cocteau (age 34; 1923).

The Soirées de Paris was a short-lived attempt by Count Étienne de Beaumont (1883–1956) – socialite, balletomane, and patron of the arts – to rival Serge Diaghilev's Ballets Russes as an arbiter of Modernism in French theatre. He was famed for the extravagant annual costume balls he hosted at his Paris mansion and had enjoyed some success financing theatrical ventures, notably the Darius Milhaud-Jean Cocteau ballet Le boeuf sur le toit (1920). In late 1923, he rented the La Cigale music hall in Montmartre, hired former Diaghilev associate Massine as his choreographer and commissioned an eclectic group of dance and dramatic pieces utilizing the talents of authors Cocteau and Tristan Tzara, composers Milhaud and Henri Sauguet, artists Georges Braque, André Derain, and Marie Laurencin, and pioneer lighting designer Loie Fuller. Beaumont's biggest coup was reuniting Massine with Picasso and Satie for their first stage collaboration since the scandalous, revolutionary Diaghilev ballet Parade (1917), and their work was anticipated as a highlight of the Soirées' inaugural season.

It was decided early on that Mercure would have no plot. The libretto has been variously attributed to Massine or Picasso, but the formal concept was Beaumont's. In a letter to Picasso dated February 21, 1924, Beaumont stated he wanted the ballet to be a series of tableaux vivants on a mythological theme, in a lighthearted manner suitable for a music hall. Beyond those stipulations he said, "I don't want to drag literature into it, nor do I want the composer or the choreographer to do so...do whatever you want." Satie's input appears to have been decisive in selecting the ancient Roman god Mercury as the subject – and not entirely for artistic reasons.

Conspicuously absent from the project was the fourth key member of the Parade team, Jean Cocteau. While Satie owed much of his postwar fame to Cocteau's promotional efforts on his behalf, he had never really gotten along with the man he described as "a charming maniac." The author's increasingly exaggerated claims for his role in Parade's success were a particular source of annoyance for both Satie and Picasso. In early 1924, just before creative talks for the Beaumont ballet got underway, Satie accused Cocteau of corrupting the morals of his onetime musical protégés Georges Auric and Francis Poulenc and severed ties with all three of them. He made the break public in an article for Paris-Journal (February 15, 1924), in which he castigated Cocteau and referred to recent ballets by Auric and Poulenc as "lots of syrupy things...buckets of musical lemonade." Auric used his position as music critic for Les Nouvelles littéraires to retaliate and for several months he and Satie took potshots at each other in the French press. Their feud would come to a climax at the Mercure opening.

It was known among the Paris cognoscenti that Cocteau personally identified with Mercury and all that the figure stood for. He invariably attended costume balls (including Beaumont's) dressed as the deity, with silver tights, winged helmet and sandals, brandishing Mercury's wand as he darted among the other guests. Furthermore, he had cast himself as Mercutio in his upcoming adaptation of Shakespeare's Romeo and Juliet for the Soirées. Since the ballet was supposed to be a mythological spoof, Satie and Picasso saw in Mercury an opportunity for some veiled mockery at Cocteau's expense. In the final scenario, Mercury is presented as a meddlesome schemer who bounds onto the stage to cause trouble and chew the scenery. The in-jokes did not stop there: according to Belgian music critic Paul Collaer, the risqué supporting characters of the Three Graces – to be performed by men in drag with enormous fake breasts – were intended to represent Auric, Poulenc, and an arch-enemy of Satie's, the critic Louis Laloy. The creators kept their work secret and Satie jokingly told the inquisitive he had no clue what the ballet was about.

== Mise-en-scène ==
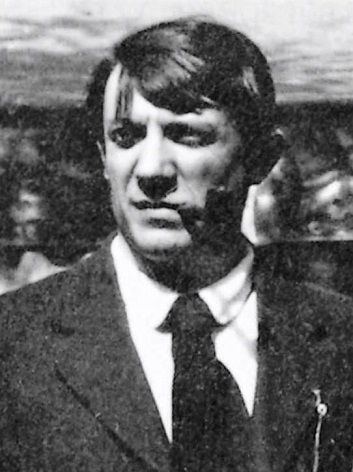
Pablo Picasso (age 34), Montparnasse (1916).

Picasso's commission for Mercure came at a turning point in his career. Although he commanded great respect among the avant-garde as the co-founder of Cubism, his postwar Neoclassical paintings had made him prosperous and fashionable. He had abandoned Montparnasse bohemianism for Right Bank high society, and there were grumblings among younger artists (especially the Dadaists) that he had "sold out to the establishment." (His friend Max Jacob referred to this time as Picasso's "duchess period"). Now he was prepared to reassert his modernist credentials by creating a freer semi-abstract style, and chose this ballet as a suitably high-profile occasion in which to introduce it to the public.

The drop curtain he designed featured patches of muted color (earth tones and pastel shades of blue, white and red) suggesting forms and landscape, over which the figures of a guitar-playing Harlequin and Pierrot with a violin were sinuously outlined in black. A lyre, the invention of Mercury, lies at their feet. A dimensional effect was created through dissociation of line and color. These principles were carried over into the largely monochrome backdrops and scenic constructions. Reliefs of painted rattan and wire were mounted onto large wooden cutouts with moveable parts, which hidden dancers shifted about the stage and manipulated along with the music. Some of them took the place of characters. The three-headed Cerberus was depicted on a circular shield beneath which only the dancer's feet were visible, and Massine described how the Three Graces were transformed into amorphous flats "with plaited necks like telephone extension wires which stretched and contracted as their heads bobbed up and down." André Breton called these puppet-like objects "tragic toys for adults." In counterpoint to the static poses of Massine's choreography, Picasso's mobile scenery became part of the dance.

After seeing the ballet Gertrude Stein wrote, "The scenery of Mercure... was written, quite simply written. There was no painting, it was pure calligraphy". Roland Penrose elaborated on this, tracing Picasso's inspiration beyond Cubism to his early gifts for contour drawing: "From childhood... Picasso had enjoyed accomplishing the feat of drawing a figure or an animal with one continuous line. His ability to make a line twist itself into the illusion of a solid being, without taking pen from paper, had become an amazing act of virtuosity and a delight to watch. The costume drawings for Mercure are a masterly example of this kind of calligraphic drawing. With characteristic inventiveness, he had foreseen how they could be carried out on the stage... The results in terms of form and movement achieved with such simple means was a triumph."

== Music ==
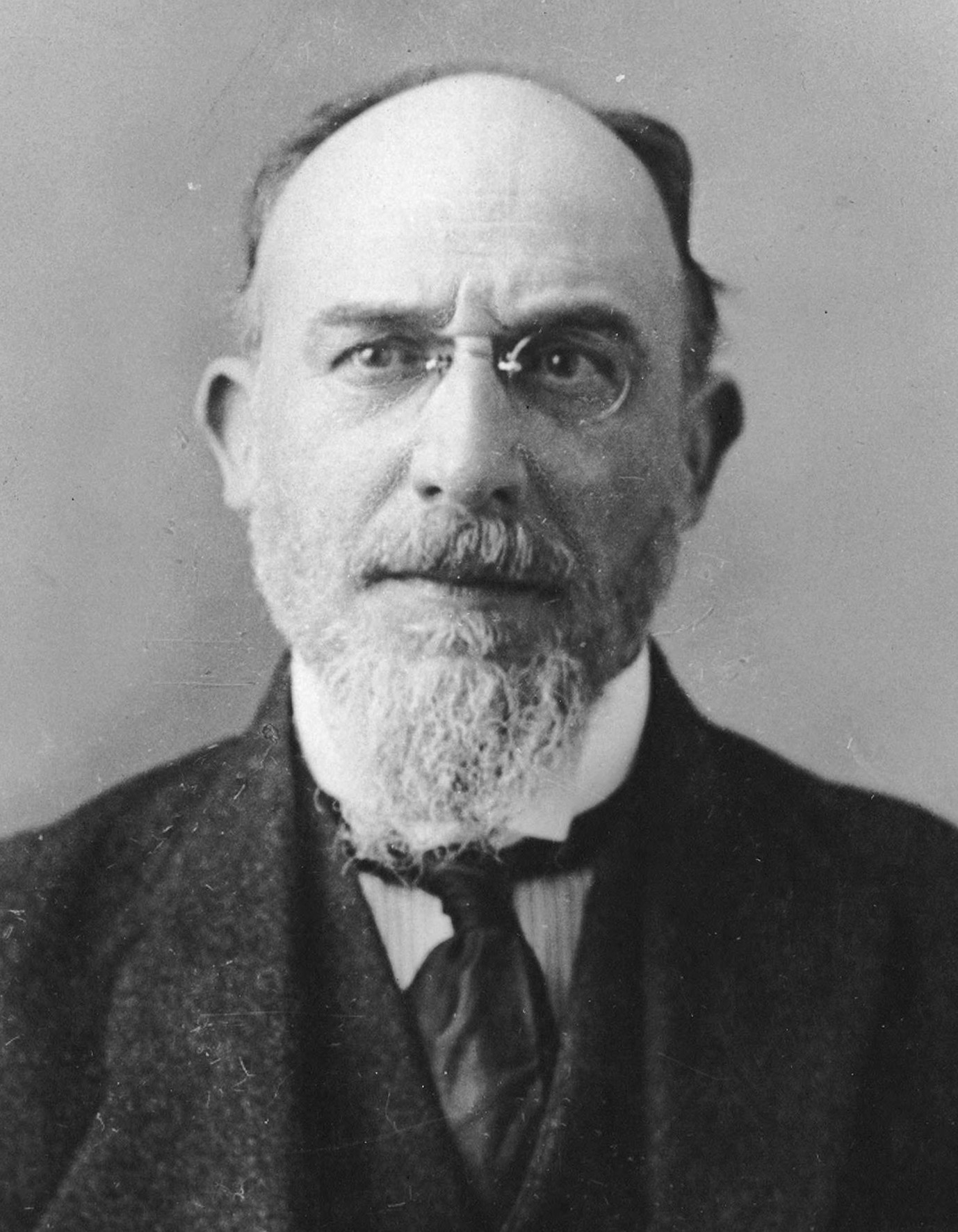
Erik Satie.

In early 1924, Satie was at the height of his postwar cachet. He had produced little since his orchestral dance suite La belle excentrique (1921), but his role as "precursor" to Debussy and Ravel was acknowledged, as was his advocacy of young French composers (Les Six and the "Arcueil School"). The March 1924 edition of La Revue musicale contained several laudatory articles about him, and that same month, he traveled to Belgium to give lectures on his music in Brussels and Antwerp. Beaumont trusted him implicitly and his influence pervaded the Soirées de Paris: most of its leading artists were Satie's friends or disciples, including 25-year-old music director Désormière, whose first important engagement this was. Once Mercure was finished, Satie would immediately tackle another big commission from Rolf de Maré of the Ballets suédois; this resulted in his final compositions, the ballet Relâche and the score for its accompanying "cinematographic interlude", Entr'acte.

A love of calligraphy was not the only thing Satie shared with Picasso. He was a perceptive, lifelong enthusiast of avant-garde art, from Impressionism to Dada. His friend Man Ray famously described him as "the only musician who had eyes." During the creation of Parade in 1916, he found Picasso's ideas most inspiring and Cocteau was forced to change his original scenario accordingly. On Mercure, Satie was able to work with the artist directly and used only the design sketches as his guide. In an interview shortly before the premiere, Satie described his aesthetic approach: "You can imagine the marvelous contribution of Picasso, which I have attempted to translate musically. My aim has been to make the music an integral part, so to speak, with the actions and gestures of the people who move about in this simple exercise. You can see poses like them in any fairground. The spectacle is related quite simply to the music hall, without stylization, or any rapport with things artistic."

Satie evoked a music hall spirit by employing naïve-sounding themes (though their harmonies are not) and popular forms (march, waltz, polka), and in the occasional self-consciously "humorous" scoring. The melody of Signes du Zodiaque is given to the tuba, while the comic effect of the transvestite Bain des graces (Bath of The Graces) is heightened by being delicately scored for strings only. At the same time, the music steers clear of any direct narrative or illustrative impulses. Constant Lambert believed the best example of Mercure's abstract quality was the penultimate number Le chaos, "a skillful blending of two previously heard movements, one the suave and sustained Nouvelle danse, the other the robust and snappy Polka des lettres. These two tunes are so disparate in mood that the effect, mentally speaking, is one of complete chaos; yet it is achieved by strictly musical and even academic means which consolidate the formal cohesion of the ballet as a whole."

The harmonious collaboration Satie enjoyed with Picasso was not shared with Massine. Mercure was originally planned as a work lasting eight minutes, but the score grew to nearly twice that length. With two other substantial ballets (Milhaud's Salade and the Strauss adaptation Le Beau Danube) and several short divertissements to stage for the Soirées, Massine urged Satie to finish the music as quickly as possible. The fact that Satie borrowed an unpublished composition from his Schola Cantorum days, the Fugue-Valse (c. 1906), for the Danse de tendresse in Tableau I suggests he was indeed rushed by Massine. The composer finally wrote to him on April 7, "I can't possibly go any faster, mon cher Ami: I can't hand over to you work which I couldn't defend. You who are conscience personified will understand me." The piano score was completed on April 17 and the orchestration on May 9. Afterwards, Satie never forgave Massine for what he felt was the choreographer's attempt to compromise his work.

Satie did not provide musical interludes to cover the scenery changes between the three tableaux. At the premiere, Désormière apparently repeated material from the ballet for this purpose, creating what Satie called "false intermissions." He demanded that the conductor follow the "original version" of the score so audiences would not misinterpret it, leaving the scene changes to take place in silence.

Mercure is scored for an orchestra of modest proportions: 1 piccolo, 1 flute, 1 oboe, 2 clarinets in B♭, 1 bassoon, 2 horns in F, 2 trumpets in C, 1 trombone, 1 tuba, percussion for 2 players (snare drum, cymbals, bass drum), and strings.

== Choreography ==
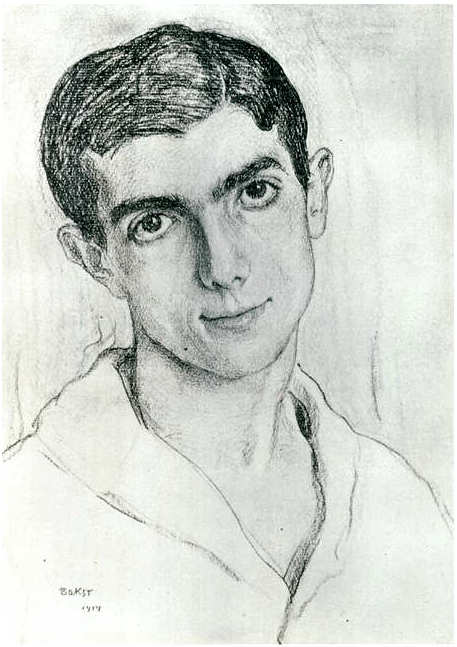
Léonide Massine, by Léon Bakst.

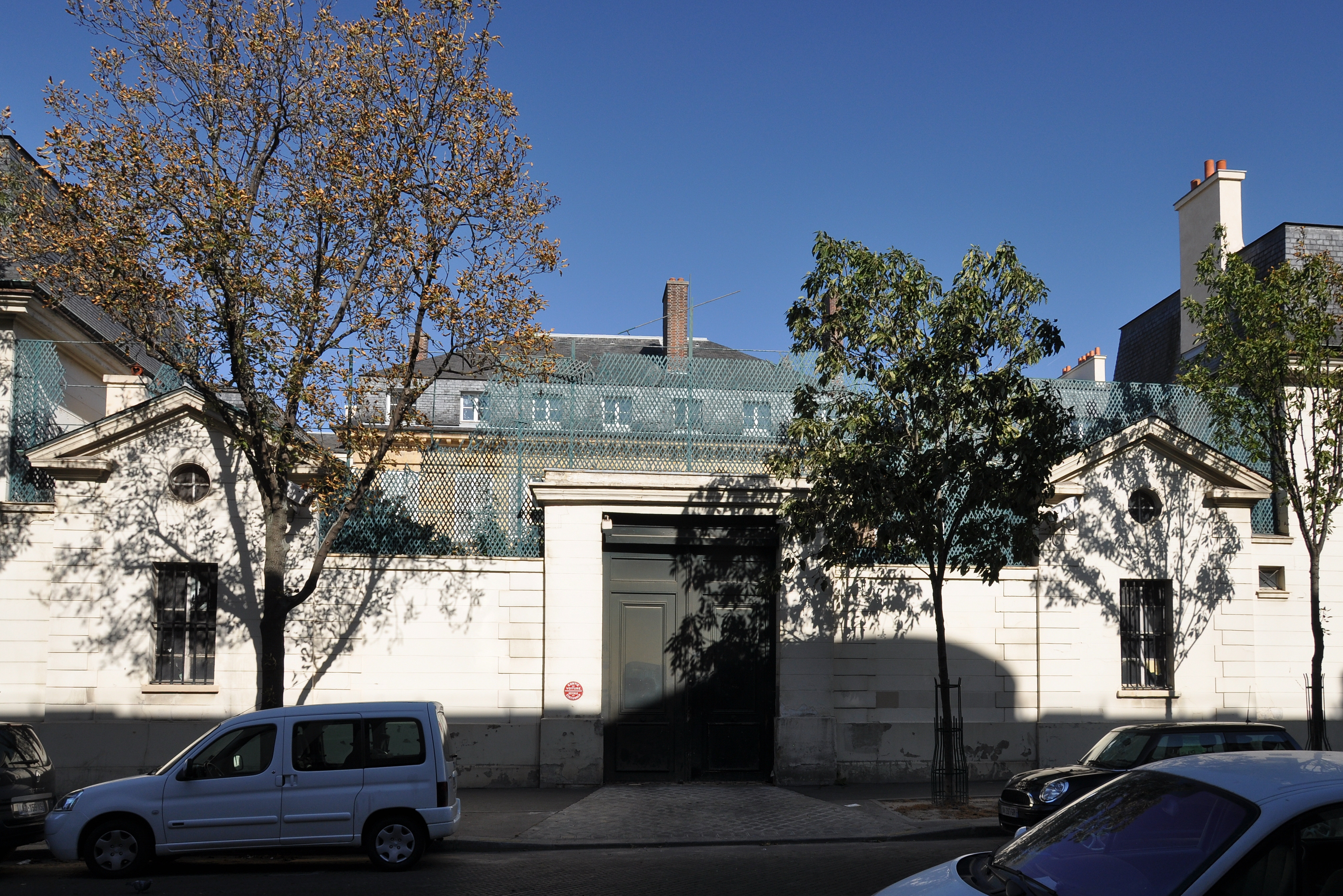
The former Beaumont mansion in the 7th arrondissement, where Massine held early rehearsals for the Soirées de Paris.

One of Beaumont's objectives for the Soirées de Paris was to provide a comeback vehicle for Massine, who had been experiencing career difficulties since his acrimonious split from Diaghilev in 1921. He was installed in an apartment at the Beaumont estate and given two large rooms for private rehearsal space. Many of the dancers he employed had previously worked for the Ballets Russes, including the Soirées' female star Lydia Lopokova.

Massine had little to say about Mercure in later years, acknowledging that it was predominately Picasso's work. Surviving drawings reveal that Picasso designed actual groupings for the dancers – the "living pictures" demanded by Beaumont. Regarding the choreography, Massine noted, "As Mercury I had a series of adventures – intervening in the affairs of Apollo, directing the signs of the Zodiac, arranging the rape of Proserpine – each of which had to be clearly differentiated in order to strengthen the comic and dramatic content of the ballet." A review of a later production suggests that among the dancers he alone kept in constant motion: "Through this series of plastic poses flew Mercury, a vivid figure in white tunic and scarlet coat, enthusiastically danced by Massine."

== The Ballet ==
Satie called Mercure "a purely decorative spectacle." The episodes and characters were loosely drawn from Roman and Greek mythology, except for the figures of Polichinelle (from Italian Commedia dell'arte) and the Philosopher in Tableau III. Below is a list of the ballet's roles and musical numbers, and summaries of the stage action.

In the original production the Overture, a light, jaunty march, was played beneath Picasso's curtain before the ballet proper began. With the exception of the Danse de tendresse, each number lasts no more than a minute.

=== Roles ===
- Mercury
- Apollo
- Venus
- Signs of the Zodiac (performed by 4 female dancers)
- The Three Graces (performed by 3 male dancers in drag)
- Cerberus
- Philosopher
- Polichinelle
- Guest of Bacchus
- Chaos (performed by 5 male dancers)
- Proserpine

=== Tableau I ===
- Ouverture (Overture)
- La nuit (Night)
- Danse de tendresse (Dance of Tenderness)
- Signes du Zodiaque (Signs of the Zodiac)
- Entrée et danse de Mercure (Entrance and Dance of Mercury)

==== Synopsis ====
Night. Apollo and Venus make love, while Mercury surrounds them with the Signs of the Zodiac. Mercury becomes jealous of Apollo, kills him by cutting his thread of life, then revives him.

=== Tableau II ===
- Danse des grâces (Dance of The Graces)
- Bain des grâces (Bath of The Graces)
- Fuite de Mercure (Flight of Mercury)
- Colère de Cerbère (The Fury of Cerberus)

==== Synopsis ====
The Three Graces perform a dance, then remove their pearls to bathe. Mercury steals the pearls and flees, pursued by Cerberus.

=== Tableau III ===
- Polka des lettres (Alphabet Polka)
- Nouvelle danse (New Dance)
- Le chaos (Chaos)
- Rapt de Proserpine (Rape of Proserpine)

==== Synopsis ====
During a feast of Bacchus, Mercury invents the alphabet. At Pluto's behest, he arranges for Chaos to abduct Proserpine. They carry her off on a chariot in the finale.

== Premiere ==
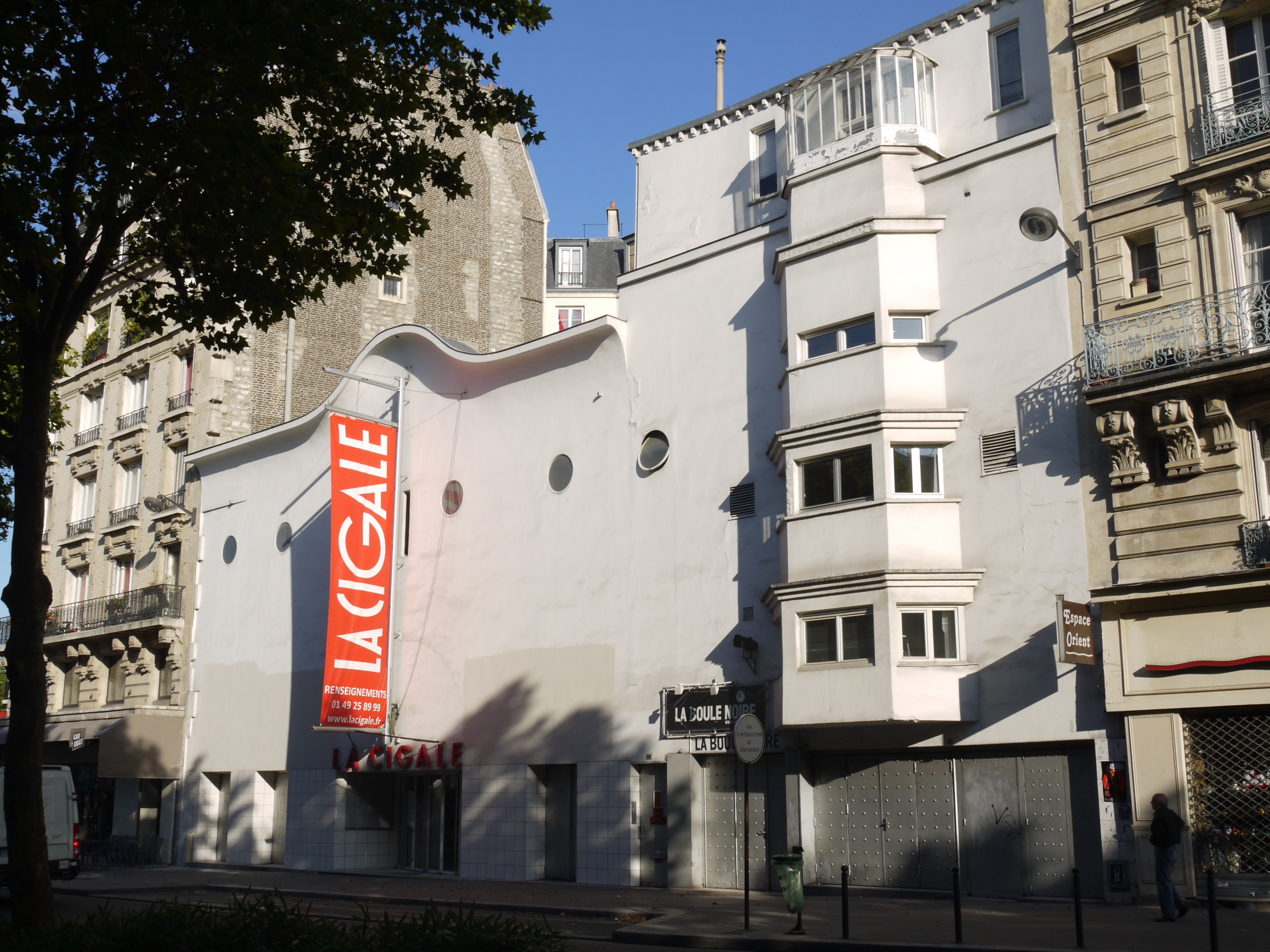
La Cigale theatre in Paris, site of the scandalous premiere of Mercure (June 15, 1924).

Mercure premiered on June 15, 1924 in a hostile atmosphere due to Parisian cultural infighting of the time. The audience was studded with cliques for and against Picasso, Satie, and Beaumont, as well as supporters of Diaghilev, whose Ballets Russes were performing across town at the Théâtre des Champs-Élysées. Most troublesome was the fledgeling Surrealist group led by André Breton and Louis Aragon. Breton was eager to win Picasso over to his cause and ready to use violence to defend his honor. During a Dada event the previous year (at which Satie was present), he responded to poet Pierre de Massot's verbal attack of Picasso by breaking Massot's arm with his walking stick. He also had a personal score to settle with Satie, who had presided over Breton's 1922 mock-trial at the Closerie des Lilas restaurant for attempting to overthrow Tzara as leader of the Dadaists. Georges Auric had become friendly with the Surrealists and exploited Breton's enmity to pressure them into disrupting the performance of Mercure.

The ballet had scarcely begun when the Surrealists started chanting "Bravo Picasso! Down with Satie!" from the back of the theatre. Darius Milhaud argued with the Breton group, Satie fans voiced their support, and a handful of people approached Picasso's box and hurled insults at him. By Tableau II, there was pandemonium in the hall and the curtain had to be lowered. Lydia Lopokova witnessed the events from the audience and quoted a protester proclaiming "Only Picasso lives, down with Beaumont's garçons and the whole Soirées de Paris!" When police arrived to eject the demonstrators, Surrealist Francis Gérard reproached Picasso: "You see, Beaumont has the police throw us out because we were applauding you!" Louis Aragon, still raging against Satie, managed to jump onto the stage and shout, "In the name of God, down with the cops!" before he was dragged off. Order was finally restored and the ballet allowed to continue.

The Surrealists not taken into custody waited outside the venue, evidently hoping to see Picasso after the performance. Instead, they encountered Satie on his way out. The composer later reassured Milhaud, "They didn't say a word to me."

Five more performances of Mercure through June 22 passed without incident.

== Reception ==
Mercure was coolly received by the public and mainstream press. Maurice Boucher of Le Monde musical remarked that despite the opening night demonstration, there was little to get upset about. He dismissed Satie's music as "the ordinary pom-pom of the music hall" and attributed the minimalism of Picasso's décor to poverty of imagination – and, perhaps, a little drunkenness.

The Surrealists seized on this indifference to write a "Tribute to Picasso", published in the June 20 issue of Paris-Journal and subsequently reprinted in several periodicals:

It is our duty to put on record our deep and wholehearted admiration for Picasso who goes on creating a troubling modernity at the highest level of expression. Once again, in Mercure, he has shown a full measure of his daring and his genius, and has met with a total lack of understanding. This event proves that Picasso, far more than any of those around him, is today the eternal personification of youth and the absolute master of the situation.

It was signed by Breton and 14 other artists and writers, including Aragon, Max Ernst, and Philippe Soupault. Renegade Dadaist Francis Picabia ridiculed this homage with a quip comparing Picasso's "troubling modernity" to the outdated fashions of designer Paul Poiret, causing Aragon to counter with his own statement: "I think that nothing stronger than this ballet has ever been presented in the theatre. It is the revelation of an entirely new manner by Picasso, which owes nothing to cubism or realism and which surpasses cubism just as it does realism." The American journal The Little Review agreed that Picasso was the star of the show: "In Mercure the musician and the choreographer served purely as accompaniment to the painter. They felt this, and with remarkable art they acquiesced to this hegemony." Debates over the significance of Picasso's décor continued for weeks, including illustrated coverage in the July 1, 1924 issue of Vogue, which gave it the imprimatur of the haut monde.

In its attempt to distance Picasso from his collaborators, the Surrealist "Tribute" sparked false rumors that Satie had fallen out with him as he had with so many other friends, due to his hypersensitive personality. Satie addressed this in a June 21 letter to Wieland Mayr, editor of the literary review les feuilles libres: "Believe me, there is no divergence of views between Picasso and me. It's all a 'gimmick' by my old friend, the famous writer Bretuchon [Breton] (who came to create a disturbance and attract attention by his shabby appearance and deplorable rudeness). Yes."

Picasso kept publicly aloof from the fray, but the Surrealists had gotten his attention. He annotated and saved a copy of their "Tribute".

== Aftermath ==
Novice impresario Beaumont was a poor organizer. Performances by the Soirées de Paris were marked by last-minute cancellations, abrupt changes of program, and on one night, a musicians' strike just as the curtain was about to go up. Reviews were mixed at best (with Massine getting most of the praise) and the enterprise lost money. The season was scheduled to run through June 30, including performances of Mercure on June 26, 27 and 28, but after June 22, the Soirées abruptly ceased without notice. Beaumont left his idle company in limbo for days before finally disbanding it. On June 29, Satie reported this to Rolf de Maré: "The Cigale (Beaumont) has closed its doors...This poor Count – who is, after all, a good man – instead of compliments has only received insults and other nice things... That's life! Most consoling!"

The Soirées de Paris was never revived, but its brief existence had a notable impact on the careers of several of those involved. Beaumont himself continued to dabble in ballet. He wrote the libretto and designed the décor for Massine's popular Offenbach adaptation Gaîté Parisienne (1938).

Mercure was Picasso's last major work for the theatre, bringing to a close a momentous period of involvement in the ballet world that had begun with Parade eight years earlier. Always aiming to reinvent himself as an artist, he was quick to recognize the potential benefits of associating with Breton and his colleagues. Mercure was the catalyst for this. According to Michael C. FitzGerald, "With Picasso's reputation in danger of losing its avant-garde edge, the Surrealists' intervention publicly restored Picasso to his accustomed position. During the following decade, Surrealism would be a primary inspiration for his art and the principal context for its public reception."

The Soirées did succeed in re-launching Massine in Paris. He was soon reconciled with Diaghilev and welcomed back to the Ballets Russes as a "guest choreographer" in January 1925, remaining with them through 1928. Diaghilev also hired Désormière as principal conductor for his troupe's final years (1925-1929).

Cocteau was deeply offended by Mercure, though he was careful to maintain his friendship with Picasso. In 1925, he wrote his play Orphée, updating the title character into a famous but beleaguered Parisian poet. From then on, the figure of Orpheus replaced Mercury in his personal mythos.

Satie fared the worst in this undertaking. Poet and critic Rene Chalupt reported that even some of the composer's closest friends were disappointed by his music. Mercure set in motion a critical backlash against Satie that would reach fever pitch with the premiere of the Dadaist Relâche in December 1924, and was hardly quelled by his death eight months later. The irreverence and perceived flippancy of these last two ballets galvanized his enemies and disillusioned many supporters who had championed him as a serious composer, with long-term negative effects on his posthumous reputation.

== Revivals ==
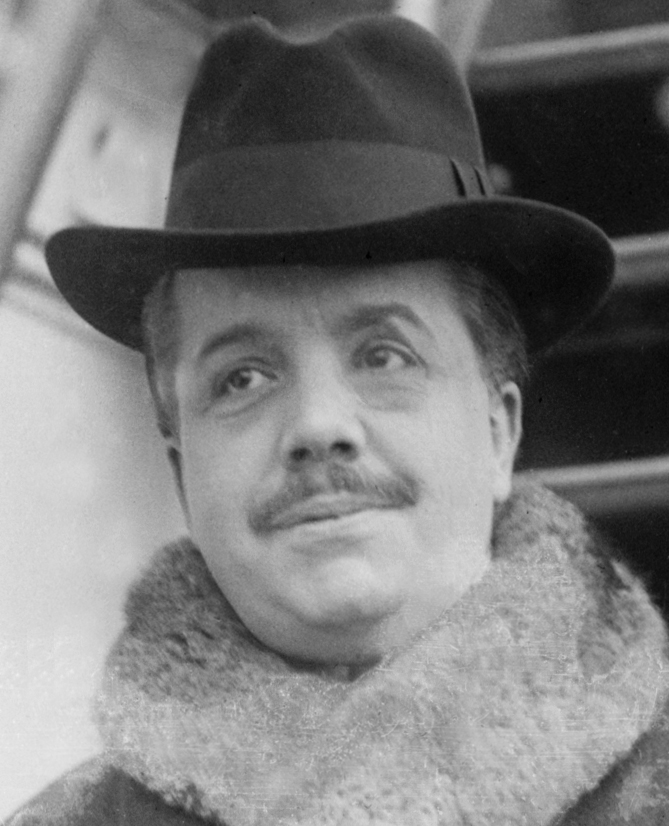
Serge Diaghilev.

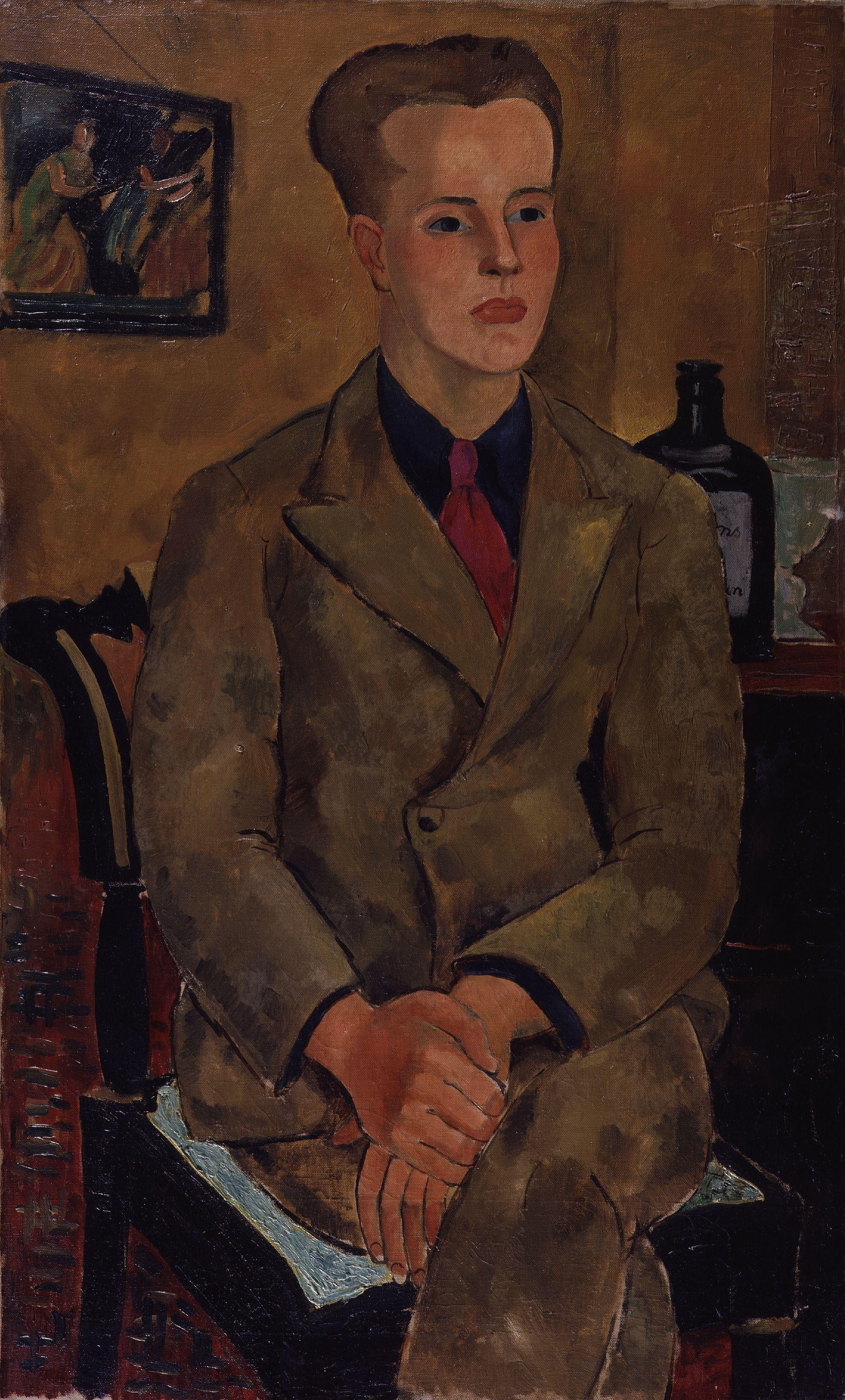
Constant Lambert was an early English champion of Satie's music, including Mercure. (Portrait by Christopher Wood)

Diaghilev was disconcerted by the Soirées de Paris, not least because some of its artists were working for him at the same time. He called it "a soirée of the Ballets Russes in which the only thing missing is my name." But he attended its performances, and the originality of Mercure left him, according to Serge Lifar, "pale, agitated, nervous." In 1926, he took the unprecedented step of acquiring Mercure from Beaumont – the only time in his career that Diaghilev bought a ballet ready-made. The Ballets Russes presented it three times during its 1927 season: on June 2 at the Théâtre Sarah-Bernhardt in Paris, and on July 11 and July 19 at the Prince's Theatre in London. Massine recreated his choreography and role as Mercury. Constant Lambert found it "extremely funny but oddly beautiful", opinions not shared by London critics. The Times reviewer thought Satie's music and Picasso's "ridiculous contraptions" were outmoded, while dance historian and critic Cyril Beaumont wrote, "The whole thing appeared incredibly stupid, vulgar, and pointless." It was never again staged in its original form.

By that time, Satie's score had already provided the basis for another ballet in the United States. Former Ballets Russes dancer Adolph Bolm and his Chicago Allied Arts company presented it in 1926 under the title Parnassus on Montmartre, with a new text about Parisian art students at a masquerade. Ruth Page starred.

London's Ballet Rambert mounted a more faithful version at the Lyric Theatre, Hammersmith on June 22, 1931. Frederick Ashton choreographed and danced Mercury, Tamara Karsavina guest-starred as Venus, and William Chappell portrayed Apollo. Constant Lambert revived Ashton's production for the Camargo Society at the Savoy Theatre in London on June 27, 1932, with Walter Gore and Alicia Markova as Mercury and Venus (renamed Terpsichore). Lambert also conducted a radio broadcast of Satie's music for Mercure over the BBC on July 13, 1932, and wrote admiringly of it in his book Music Ho! A Study of Music in Decline (1934).

An adaptation entitled The Home Life of The Gods was produced by the Littlefield Ballet in Philadelphia in December 1936. The choreography was by Lasar Galpern.

Since World War II, Mercure has existed primarily as a concert piece. Désormière kept it in his repertoire and there is a live recording (December 2, 1947) of him performing it with the Orchestre National de France. Lambert broadcast Mercure again with the London Symphony Orchestra on June 14, 1949, as part of a three-concert Satie series he conducted for the BBC Third Programme. Apart from Satie's score (first published in 1930), all that survives of the original production are Picasso's drop curtain and a few design sketches and photographs. The curtain was restored in 1998 and is on display at the Musée National d'Art Moderne in Paris. A woven tapestry replica, authorized by the artist in the late 1960s, hangs in the lobby of the 1251 Avenue of the Americas building in Manhattan.

In 1980, composer Harrison Birtwistle published his own instrumental arrangement of Mercure, echoing a long-held (and disputed) opinion that Satie lacked skill as an orchestrator.

== Recordings ==
Mercure is the least known of Satie's three major ballets and has had comparatively few commercial recordings. Among them are renditions by conductors Maurice Abravanel (Vanguard, 1968), Pierre Dervaux (EMI, 1972), Bernard Herrmann (Decca, 1973), Ronald Corp (Musical Heritage Society, 1993, reissued by Hyperion in 2004), and Jérôme Kaltenbach (Naxos, 1999).
