= Carina Ari =

Swedish dancer, choreographer, and sculptor

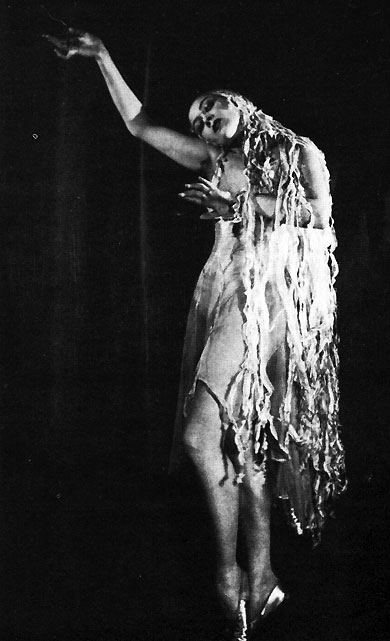
- Born: Maria Karina Viktoria Jansson; 14 April 1897; Stockholm, Sweden
- Died: 24 December 1970 (aged 73); Buenos Aires, Argentina
- Occupations: ballerina, choreographer, sculptor, philanthropist
- Years active: 1913–1951
- Known for: creating the Carina Ari Foundation

Carina Ari (14 April 1897 – 24 December 1970) was the artistic name of Maria Karina Viktoria Jansson, a Swedish-born dancer. After a noted career of dance and choreography which spanned from 1913 to 1939, mostly in Paris, Ari married and moved to Argentina. Taking up sculpting, she created busts of several prominent figures. Beginning in 1951, she created endowments to care for dancers, establishing funds to care for ill or aging dancers, to promote new talent, and to establish a library in Sweden to encourage study on dance. The Carina Ari Library in Stockholm holds one of the most extensive collections of archival materials on dance in Europe.

== Early life ==
Maria Karina Viktoria Jansson was born on 14 April 1897 in Stockholm, Sweden. Raised in poverty, with questions of her heritage, due to her swarthy complexion, Jansson dreamed of becoming a dancer from a young age. In 1911, she enrolled in the dance school offered by the Royal Swedish Opera, graduating in 1913.

== Career ==
Upon completion of her studies, Jansson entered the corps de ballet of the Royal Swedish Ballet (RSB). 1913 was the year in which Michel Fokine joined the RSB as its artistic director. His approach differed to what had been done in the past, promoting dancers to roles based on ability, rather than by their rank in the company. Fokine selected Jansson to participate in the corps de ballet for the production of Les Sylphides and the following year chose her for a small role in Scheherazade. Activities of the ballet company were suspended during World War I, but in 1918 and again in 1919, Jansonn participated with Fokine in two guest appearances over the summer at the theater of Tivoli Gardens. During the first of these appearances, Jansonn changed her artistic name to Carina Ari.

In 1919, Ari quit the Royal Ballet, borrowed money, and moved to Charlottenlund Denmark to study with Fokine, who had taken a villa there. After graduating from Fokine's training and receiving his endorsement for her choreographic abilities, she returned to Stockholm. She was hired by Mauritz Stiller to choreograph the ballet Schaname for his film Erotikon (1920). The ballet scene was extensive and required the entire Royal Ballet for the performance. Soon after filming ended, she left Stockholm and moved to Paris. She worked as a principal dancer with the Rolf de Maré's Ballets suédois from 1920 to 1923, noted for her flowing arm movements. The first production by the company, Ibéra was composed by Isaac Albéniz, based on Spanish themes suited both Ari's dark appearance and her dancing style. She also appeared in Jeux and La Nuit de Saint-Jean to acclaim, and then in 1922, Jean Börlin, the other soloist and choreographer, wrote Anitra’s Dance especially for her. She performed the piece receiving good reviews and calls for encore, but the notice she was getting caused conflict with Börlin, who forbade her to dance it again. Ari left the company after the 1923 season.

Ari was then hired as a soloist at the Opéra-Comique, where Désiré-Émile Inghelbrecht served as music director. The two married in 1925, the same year she launched Scénes Dansées. The ballet, which she choreographed and danced, featured a full symphony orchestra, detailed stage designs and eight solo dances, with no intermissions. Between dances, Ari would run to the wings and quickly change costumes, before her next dance. The performance was one of the first in which a classically trained ballerina appeared in a theatrical production on such a large scale and approached modern dance more than her classical roots. Her reviews were excellent, and she toured throughout Europe with the production until 1939. In 1928 Ari was hired by the Paris Opera to choreograph and she created Rayon de Lune, dancing as one of the leads. The music for the ballet was based on Thème et Variations was composed by Gabriel Fauré. The following year, she formed her own company and was hired as a choreographer for the Fête des Narcisses held in Montreux, Switzerland. Then for the 1929–1930 season she served as the ballet mistress for the Algerian National Theater Mahieddine Bachtarzi in Algiers. Returning to Paris, she became the ballet director at the Opéra-Comique until 1933. Between 1935 and 1937, she appeared in Stockholm at the Royal Opera. In 1938, Ari was hired as the soloist for the role of the Sulamite in Le Cantique des Cantiques by Serge Lifar. Though he had many stars at the Paris Opera to choose from, he selected Ari because of her fluidity and more modern style. Her last performance was on 30 March 1939, when she performed her Scénes Dansées at the Opéra-Comique.

Suffering from rheumatism, Ari traveled to Aix-les-Bains in the south of France where she met Jan Henrik Molzer, one of the principals of the Dutch beverage firm Bols. She and Inghelbrecht split up, Ari married Molzer and in 1940, moved to Buenos Aires, Argentina. Ari began a second career as a sculptor. Her most noted pieces are busts of Dag Hammarskjöld, Serge Lifar and Rolf de Maré. Her bust of Hammarskjöld is on display at the tower which bears his name in New York City. Upon her husband's death in 1951, Ari began using her fortune to dancers who were ill or aging.

== Death and legacy ==
Ari died on 24 December 1970 in Buenos Aires. In 1961, she created an annual scholarship to be awarded to a promising young dancer, as well as an annual medal to recognize those who promote the development of dance in Sweden. In 1969, Ari endowed a second foundation bearing her name to create the Carina Ari Library. The library is annexed to the Dance Museum of Sweden and contains the most comprehensive archive of dance literature in Northern Europe.
