= Surrealist music =

Music genre

Surrealist music is music which uses unexpected juxtapositions and other surrealist techniques. Discussing Theodor W. Adorno, Max Paddison defines surrealist music as that which "juxtaposes its historically devalued fragments in a montage-like manner which enables them to yield up new meanings within a new aesthetic unity", though Lloyd Whitesell says this is Paddison's gloss of the term. Anne LeBaron cites automatism, including improvisation, and collage as the primary techniques of musical surrealism. According to Whitesell, Paddison quotes Adorno's 1930 essay "Reaktion und Fortschritt" as saying "Insofar as surrealist composing makes use of devalued means, it uses these as devalued means, and wins its form from the 'scandal' produced when the dead suddenly spring up among the living."

== Early surrealist music ==
In the 1920s several composers were influenced by surrealism, or by individuals in the surrealist movement. The two composers most associated with surrealism during this period were Erik Satie, who wrote the score for the ballet Parade, causing Guillaume Apollinaire to coin the term surrealism, and George Antheil who wrote that, "The Surrealist movement had, from the very beginning, been my friend. In one of its manifestos it had been declared that all music was unbearable—excepting, possibly, mine—a beautiful and appreciated condescension." Early surrealist music was also linked to film; according to Hannah Lewis:

perhaps one of the most famous early film scores was Satie's music for René Clair's film Entr'acte. Shown between the acts of Satie's ballet Relâche performed by the Ballets suédois in 1924, the film, featuring a scenario by Dadaist artist Francis Picabia, was an important precursor to surrealist cinema. The film, too, featured unusual juxtapositions and dream logic, and some have considered the film, and by extension Satie's score, to be surrealist."

Adorno cites as the most consequent surrealist compositions those works by Kurt Weill, such as The Threepenny Opera and Rise and Fall of the City of Mahagonny, along with works by others drawn from the middle-period music of Igor Stravinsky—most particularly that of L'Histoire du soldat—and defines this surrealism as a hybrid form between the "modern" music of Arnold Schoenberg and his school, and the "objectivist" neoclassicism/folklorism of the later Stravinsky. This surrealism, like objectivism, recognizes alienation but is more socially alert. It thereby denies itself the positivist notions of objectivism, which are recognised as illusion. Its content deals instead with "permitting social flaws to manifest themselves by means of flawed invoice, which defines itself as illusory with no attempts at camouflage through attempts at an aesthetic totality", thereby destroying aesthetic formal immanence and transcending into the literary realm. This surrealism is further differentiated from a fourth type of music, the so-called Gebrauchsmusik of Paul Hindemith and Hanns Eisler, which attempts to break through alienation from within itself, even at the expense of its immanent form.

The early works of musique concrète by Pierre Schaeffer have a surrealist character owing to the unexpected juxtaposition of sound objects, such as the sounds of Balinese priests chanting, a barge on the River Seine, Sacha Guitry's singing and coughing, and rattling saucepans in Étude aux casseroles (1948). The composer Olivier Messiaen referred to the "surrealist anxiety" of Schaeffer's early work in contrast to the "asceticism" of the later Etude aux allures of 1958. After the first concert of musique concrète (Concert de bruits, 5 October 1948) Schaeffer received a letter from one member of the audience (identified only as G. M.) describing it as "the music heard, by themselves alone, by Poe and Lautréamont, and Raymond Roussel. The concert of noises represents not only the first concert of surrealist music, but also contains, in my view, a musical revolution." Schaeffer himself argued that musique concrète, in its initial phase, tended either towards atonality or surrealism, or both, rather than, as it subsequently became, the starting point of a more general musical procedure.
