= Les Mariés de la tour Eiffel =

1921 French ballet

- Choreographer: Jean Börlin
- Music: Les Six
- Libretto: Jean Cocteau
- Premiere: 18 June 1921; Théâtre des Champs-Élysées, Paris
- Original ballet company: Ballets suédois

Les Mariés de la tour Eiffel (The Wedding Party on the Eiffel Tower) is a ballet to a libretto by Jean Cocteau, choreography by Jean Börlin, set by Irène Lagut, costumes by Jean Hugo, and music by five members of Les Six: Georges Auric, Arthur Honegger, Darius Milhaud, Francis Poulenc and Germaine Tailleferre. The score calls for two narrators. The ballet was first performed in Paris in 1921.

== Background ==
The ballet had its genesis in a commission to Jean Cocteau and Georges Auric, from Rolf de Maré of the Ballets suédois. Cocteau's original title for his scenario was The Wedding Party Massacre. It has been suggested that Raymond Radiguet, the young writer close to Cocteau at the time, made some contribution to the libretto.

Running short of time, Auric asked his fellow members of Les Six to also contribute music, and all of them did except Louis Durey, who pleaded illness.

It was staged by the Ballets suédois at the Théâtre des Champs-Élysées in Paris on 18 June 1921, the principal dancers being C. Ari, J. Figoni, and K. Vahlander. The orchestra was conducted by Désiré-Émile Inghelbrecht. The narrators were Jean Cocteau and Pierre Bertin.

It had a brief moment of fame and even scandal, but then fell into oblivion, although it was given in New York City in 1923. A new production opened there in 1988.

== Story ==
The story of the ballet is somewhat nonsensical:

The new couple have a wedding breakfast on Bastille Day (July 14) at a table on one of the platforms of the famous tower. A guest makes a pompous speech. When a humpbacked photographer bids everyone to "watch the birdie," it appears that a telegraph office suddenly springs into existence on the platform. A lion comes in and eats one of the guests for breakfast and a strange figure called "a child of the future" appears and kills everybody. Nevertheless, the ballet concludes with the end of the wedding.

When asked what the ballet was about, Cocteau replied: "Sunday vacuity; human beastliness, ready-made expressions, disassociation of ideas from flesh and bone, ferocity of childhood, the miraculous poetry of everyday life."

On 29 July 1923, in a letter, Francis Poulenc described the work as "toujours de la merde ... hormis l'Ouverture d'Auric" ("yet more shit ... apart from Auric's Overture").

== The ballet ==
The musical sections of the ballet are:

- Overture (14 July) - Georges Auric
- Marche nuptiale - Darius Milhaud
- Discours du Général (Polka) – Francis Poulenc
- La Baigneuse de Trouville – Poulenc
- La Fugue du massacre – Milhaud
- La Valse des dépêches – Germaine Tailleferre
- Marche funèbre – Arthur Honegger (in which he quotes the Waltz from Gounod's Faust)
- Quadrille – Tailleferre
- Ritournelles – Auric
- Sortie de la noce – Milhaud.

Between the music, there are narrated and acted scenes.

== Recordings ==
The score was unpublished until the first full recording of the work in 1966, which was supervised by Darius Milhaud.

Les Mariés was performed by the Delft student music company "Krashna Musika" in Delft, the Netherlands, on 2 May 1975, as part of the Student Music Festival "Muzikaal Totaal", conceived by Guus Ranke. It was repeated on 23 May 1975, in theatre "De Junushof" in Wageningen, The Netherlands. Both performances were in Dutch. The Wageningen edition was recorded, and can be obtained via Krashna Musika / KRAK from June 2020 on.

The ballet has also been recorded more recently by the Philharmonia Orchestra under Geoffrey Simon.

In 1987, Marius Constant arranged the music for an ensemble of fifteen instruments: wind quintet, string quintet, trumpet, trombone, harp and two percussion. This version of the music has been recorded by the Erwartung Ensemble under Bernard Desgraupes, with Jean-Pierre Aumont and Raymond Gerome, narrators.

== Adaptations ==
In 2003 Peter Dizozza composed an American version, The Marriage at the Statue of Liberty, for performance during the 2003 Surrealist Exhibition, Brave Destiny, at The Williamsburg Art and Historical Center (formerly the Kings County Savings Bank).
