= La Création du monde =

Ballet by Darius Milhaud

La Création du monde The Creation of the World
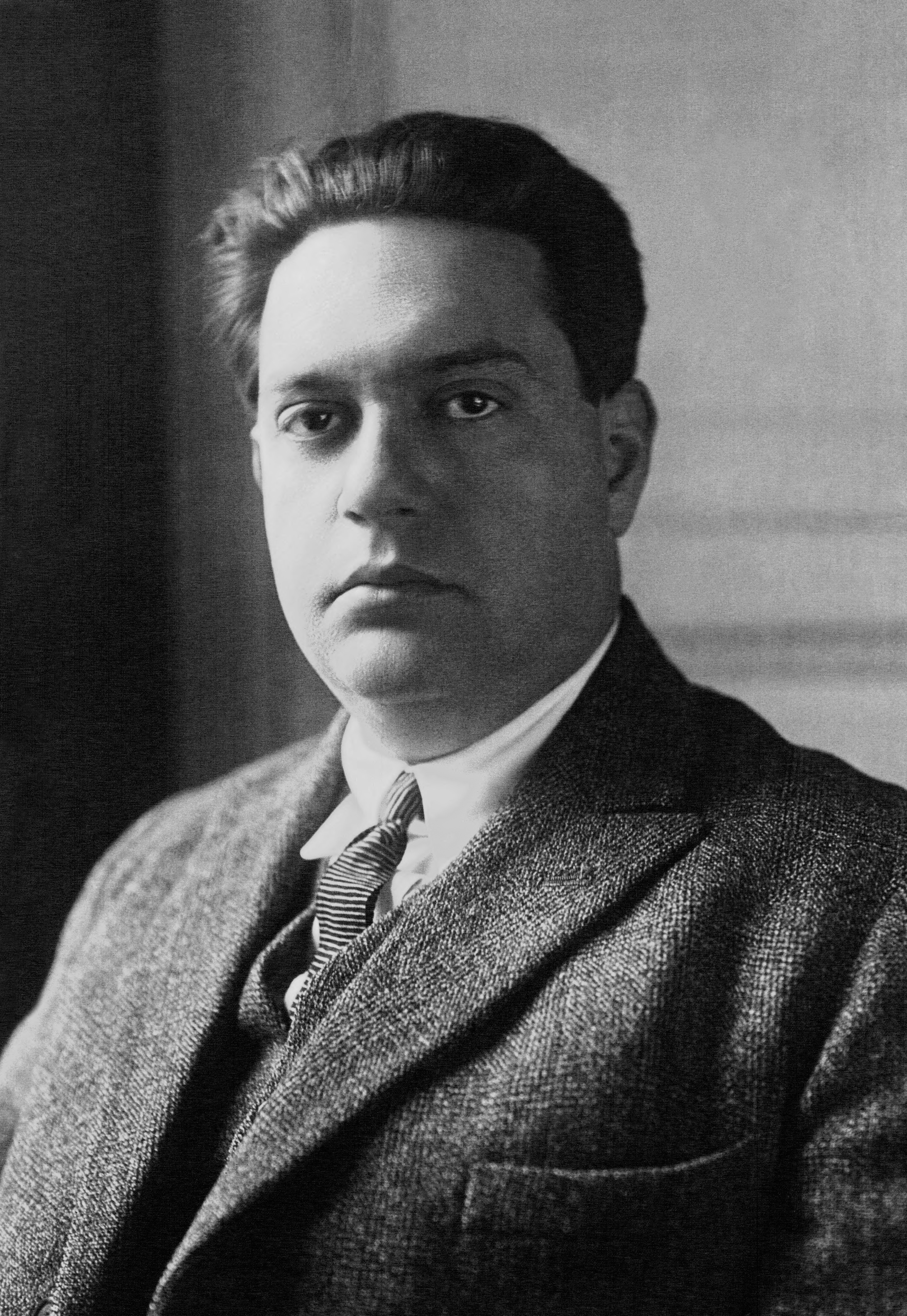
- Darius Milhaud in 1923.
- Choreographer: Jean Börlin
- Music: Darius Milhaud
- Based on: African folk mythology
- Premiere: 25 October 1923; Théâtre des Champs-Élysées, Paris
- Original ballet company: Ballets suédois

La Création du monde, Op. 81a, is a 15-minute-long ballet composed by Darius Milhaud in 1922–23 to a libretto by Blaise Cendrars, which outlines the creation of the world based on African folk mythology. The premiere took place on 25 October 1923 at Théâtre des Champs-Élysées in Paris.

== Background ==
It was in London in 1920 that Milhaud discovered jazz. On a trip to the United States in 1922, Darius Milhaud heard "authentic" jazz on the streets of Harlem, which left a great impact on his musical outlook. It was like nothing he had heard before. He wrote "against the beat of the drums, the melodic lines crisscrossed in a breathless pattern of broken and twisted rhythms." Using jazz elements, the following year he finished composing La Création du monde, which was cast as a ballet in six continuous parts. The work was commissioned by the Ballets suédois, a ballet company which was contemporary to Diaghilev's Ballets Russes. The company was very influential in the early 1920s, staging five seasons in Paris and touring continually. They had also produced another ballet using music by Milhaud "L'Homme et son désir".

The ballet reflects both the ideal of the aesthetic of Les six to combine popular forms of art and a centuries-old French penchant for exoticism. Milhaud was very susceptible to all kinds of influences, but it was a different type of exoticism that drew him. He was in the Paris of Le jazz hot, singer Josephine Baker, Pablo Picasso's paintings, and the sculptures inspired by African masks. During the early '20s, African (and Afro-American) fashion was sweeping Paris, and this ballet may have been Ballets suédois' attempt to follow the trend. Les Six frequently socialized at the Gaya Bar, where Milhaud liked to hear Jean Wiener play "negro music" in a popular style. During the jazz age in Paris this music was often labeled "le tumulte noir (the black noise)."

When Milhaud first heard an American jazz band in London (1920), he was reportedly so captivated that he took off to New York City to spend time in clubs and bars, visit Harlem and mingle with jazz musicians. After returning to France, Milhaud began to write in what he called a jazz idiom. He chose to color his music with bluesy turns of harmony and melody, swinging climaxes, and stomping rhythms. Jazz influences appear in many of his compositions, but this ballet was the first opportunity to express his new passion; even the instrumental grouping draws on his memories of New York City. "In some of the shows," Milhaud noted, "the singers were accompanied by flute, clarinet, trumpets, trombone, a complicated percussion section played by just one man, piano and string quartet."

Leonard Bernstein said of the piece, "The Creation of the World emerges not as a flirtation but as a real love affair with jazz."

== Reception ==
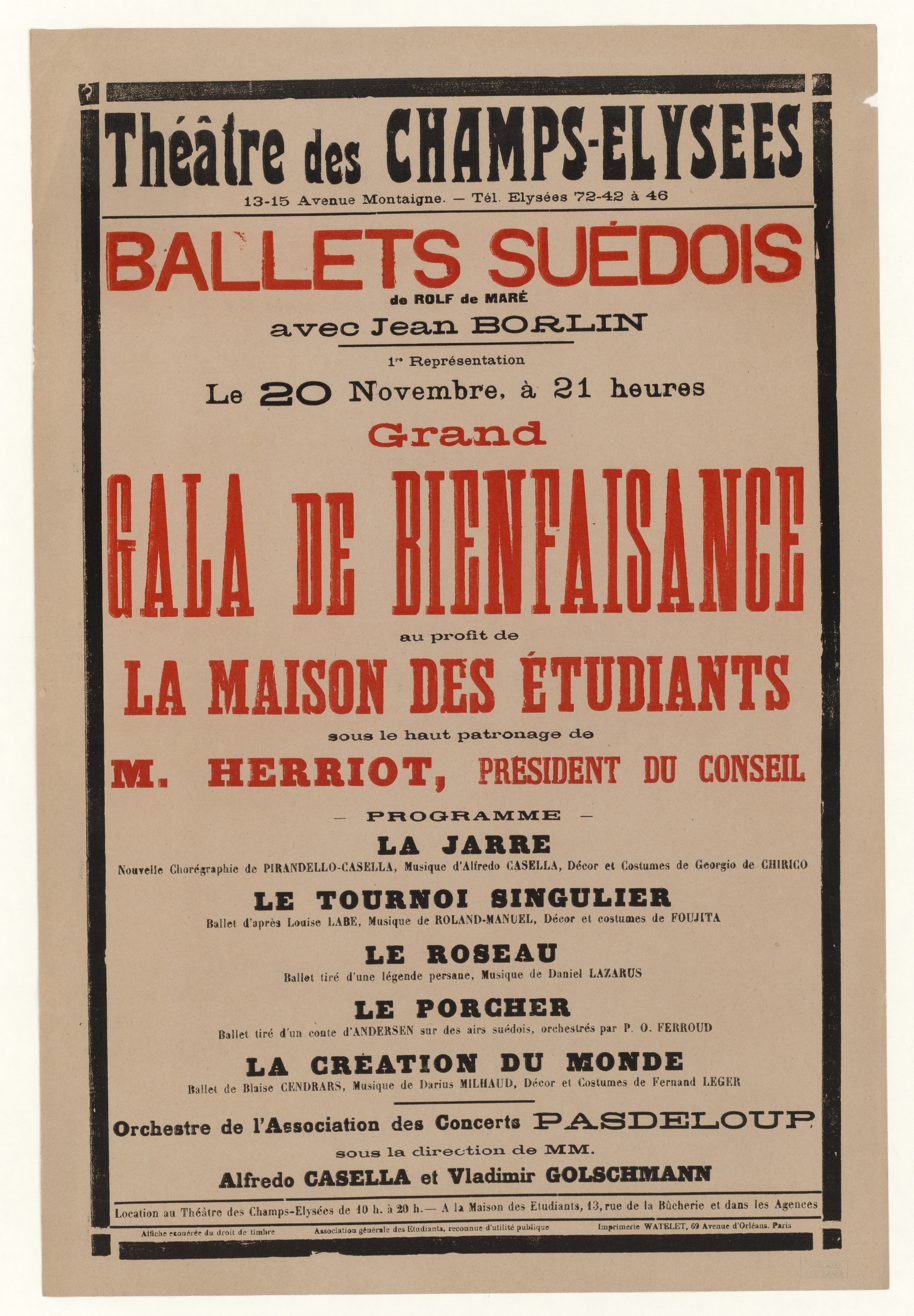
Poster for a performance of La création du monde with other works

At the time, La Création du monde was more a succès de scandale than a true success. The ballet costumes designed by Fernand Léger (who also created the stage sets) worked well visually, but were difficult to dance in; the costumes were heavy and too inflexible to allow the dancers to move freely.

The costumes and sets from the original performance of La Création du monde still survive in museums and galleries, while the music has taken its place in the concert repertoire. The choreography is revived occasionally out of curiosity.

== Instrumentation ==
The score is written for a small orchestra of eighteen instrumentalists: 2 flutes, (1 also plays piccolo), oboe, 2 clarinets, bassoon, alto saxophone, french horn, 2 trumpets, trombone, piano, 3 timpani + 2 small timpani, 1 percussionist (snare drum, tenor drum, tambourin, pedal bass drum + cymbal attachment, cymbals, tambourine, wood-block and cowbell), 2 violins, violoncello, and double bass. The alto saxophone part appears in the score where a viola part would generally be. Milhaud also made a version for piano and string quartet (Op. 81b).

== Notable recordings ==
- Darius Milhaud/orchestra of 19 soloists (Columbia (France), 1932)
- Leonard Bernstein/Victor Chamber Orchestra (RCA, 1945)
- Leonard Bernstein/Columbia Chamber Orchestra, including Benny Goodman (Columbia, 1951)
- Darius Milhaud/Orchestre de théâtre des Champs Elysées (Disques André Charlin, 1958)
- John Carewe/members of the London Symphony Orchestra (Everest, 1959)
- Charles Munch/Boston Symphony Orchestra (RCA, 1961)
- Georges Prêtre/The Paris Conservatoire Orchestra (EMI, 1961)
- Bernard Herrmann/London Festival Recording Ensemble (Decca, 1971)
- Arthur Weisberg/Contemporary Chamber Ensemble (Nonesuch, 1973)
- Leonard Bernstein/Orchestre National de France (EMI, 1976)
- Simon Rattle/London Sinfonietta (EMI, 1986)
- André Previn with string quartet (chamber version, RCA, 1993)
- Michael Tilson Thomas/New World Symphony (RCA, 1997)
- Orpheus Chamber Orchestra with Branford Marsalis (Sony, 2000)
