= String section =

Section of an orchestra

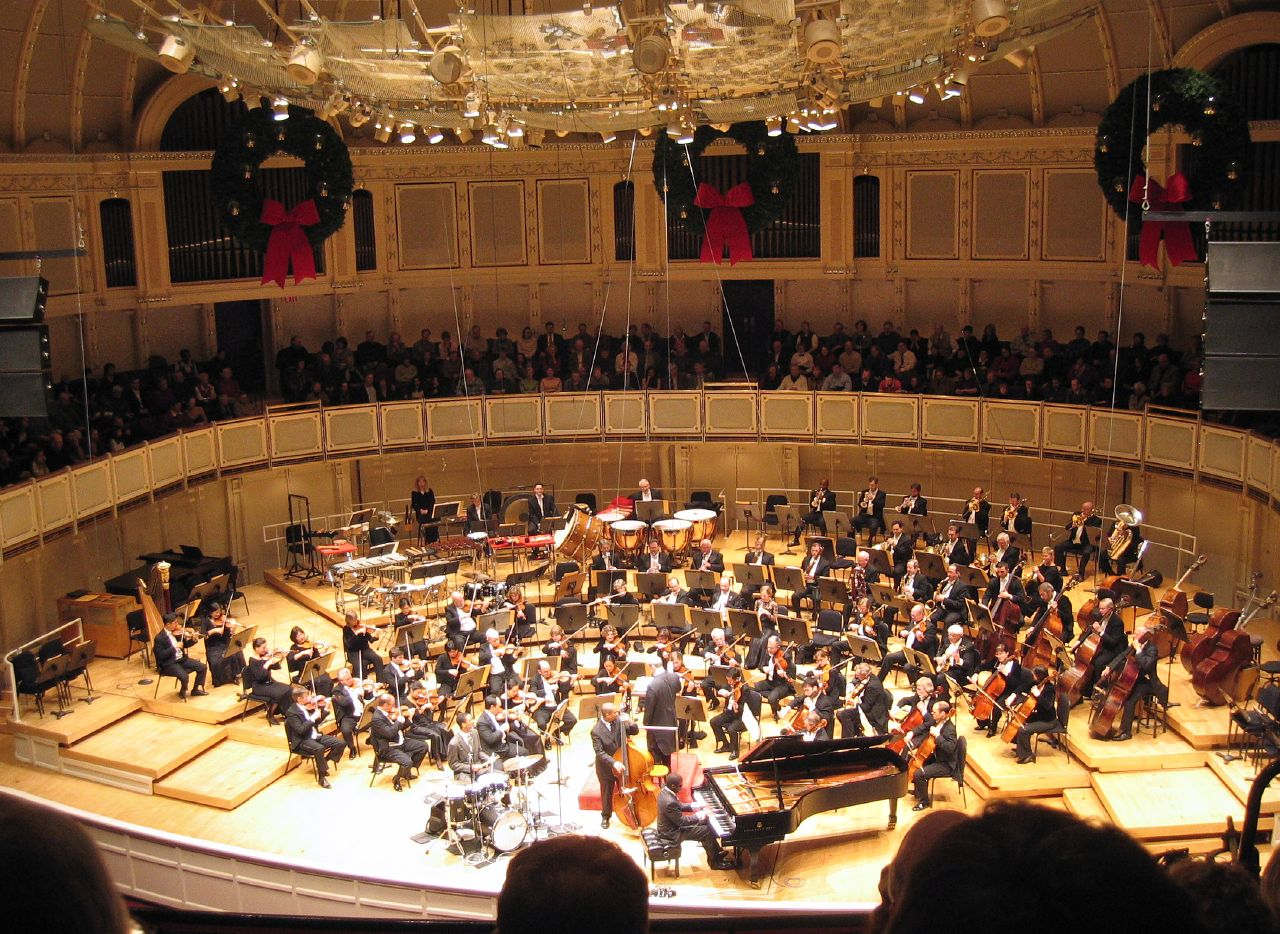
The Chicago Symphony Orchestra performing with a jazz group. The string sections are at the front of the orchestra, arrayed in a semicircle around the conductor's podium.

In music, the string section, or collectively "the strings", of an orchestra is composed of bowed instruments belonging to the violin family. A typical string section consists of first and second violins, violas, cellos, and double basses, usually being the most numerous group in a standard orchestra. Smaller string sections are sometimes used in jazz, pop, and rock music and in the pit orchestras of musical theatre.

An orchestra that is exclusively a string section is referred to as a string orchestra.

== Seating arrangement ==
One possible seating arrangement for an orchestra.

The most common seating arrangement in the 21st century is with first violins, second violins, violas, and cello sections arrayed clockwise around the conductor, with basses behind the cellos on the right. The first violins are led by the concertmaster (leader in the UK); each of the other string sections also has a principal player (principal second violin, principal viola, principal cello, and principal bass) who play the orchestral solos for the section, lead entrances and, in some cases, determine the bowings for the section (the concertmaster/leader may set the bowings for all strings, or just for the upper strings). The principal string players sit at the front of their section, closest to the conductor and on the row of performers which is closest to the audience.

In the 19th century it was standard to have the first and second violins on opposite sides (violin I, cello, viola, violin II), rendering obvious the crossing of their parts in, for example, the opening of the finale to Tchaikovsky's Sixth Symphony. If space or numbers are limited, cellos and basses can be put in the middle, violins and violas on the left (thus facing the audience) and winds to the right; this is the usual arrangement in orchestra pits. The seating may also be specified by the composer, as in Béla Bartók's Music for Strings, Percussion and Celesta, which uses antiphonal string sections, one on each side of the stage.

=== "Desks" and divisi ===
In a typical stage set-up, the first and second violins, violas and cellos are seated by twos, a pair of performers sharing a stand being called a "desk", Each principal (or section leader) is usually on the "outside" of the first desk, that is, closest to the audience. When the music calls for subdivision of the players the normal procedure for such divisi passages is that the "outside" player of the desk (the one closer to the audience) takes the upper part, the "inside" player the lower, but it is also possible to divide by alternating desks, the favored method in threefold divisi. The "inside" player typically turns the pages of the part, while the "outside" player continues playing. In cases where a page turn occurs during an essential musical part, modern performers may photocopy some of the music to enable the page turn to take place during a less important place in the music.

There are more variations of set-up with the double bass section, depending on the size of the section and the size of the stage. The basses are commonly arranged in an arc behind the cellos, either standing or sitting on high stools, usually with two players sharing a stand; though occasionally, due to the large width of the instrument, it is found easier for each player to have their own stand. There are not usually as many basses as cellos, so they are either in one row, or for a larger section, in two rows, with the second row behind the first. In some orchestras, some or all of the string sections may be placed on wooden risers, which are platforms that elevate the performers.

== Numbers and proportions ==
The size of a string section may be expressed with a formula of the type (for example) 10–10–8–10–6, designating the number of first violins, second violins, violas, cellos, and basses. The numbers can vary widely: Wagner in Die Walküre specifies 16–16–12–12–8; the band orchestra in Darius Milhaud's La création du monde is 1–1–0–1–1. In general, music from the Baroque period (ca. 1600–1750) and the Classical period (ca. 1720–1800) used (and is often played in the modern era with) smaller string sections. During the Romantic period (ca. 1800–1910), string sections were significantly enlarged to produce a louder, fuller string sound that could match the loudness of the large brass sections used in orchestral music from this period. During the modern era, some composers requested smaller string sections. In some regional orchestras, amateur orchestras and youth orchestras, the string sections may be relatively small, due to the challenges of finding enough string players.

The music for a string section is not necessarily written in five parts; besides the variants discussed below, in classical orchestras the 'quintet' is often called a 'quartet', with basses and cellos playing together.

=== Double bass section ===
The role of the double bass section evolved considerably during the 19th century. In orchestral works from the classical era, the bass and cello would typically play from the same part, labelled "Bassi". Given the pitch range of the instruments, this means that if a double bassist and a cellist read the same part, the double bass player would be doubling the cello part an octave lower. While passages for cellos alone (marked senza bassi) are common in Mozart and Haydn, independent parts for both instruments become frequent in Beethoven and Rossini and common in later works of Verdi and Wagner.

== Variants ==
=== String section without violins ===
In Haydn's oratorio The Creation, the music to which God tells the newly created beasts to be fruitful and multiply achieves a rich, dark tone by its setting for divided viola and cello sections with violins omitted. Famous works without violins include the 6th of the Brandenburg Concerti by Bach, Second Serenade of Brahms, the opening movement of Brahms's Ein deutsches Requiem, Andrew Lloyd Webber's Requiem, and Philip Glass's opera Akhnaten. Fauré's original versions of his Requiem and Cantique de Jean Racine were without violin parts, there being parts for 1st and 2nd viola, and for 1st and 2nd cello; though optional violin parts were added later by publishers. Some orchestral works by Giacinto Scelsi omit violins, using only the lower strings.

=== String section without violas ===
Darius Milhaud's La crèation du monde has no parts for violas.

=== String section without violins or violas ===
Stravinsky's Symphony of Psalms has no parts for violins or violas.
Gubaidulina's Concerto for Bassoon and Low Strings has no parts for violins or violas.

=== Third violins ===
Richard Strauss' Elektra (1909) and Josephslegende, the third movement of Shostakovich's Symphony No. 5 and some of Handel's coronation anthems, are notable examples of the violins being divided threefold.

== In other musical genres ==
"String section" is also used to describe a group of bowed string instruments used in rock, pop, jazz and commercial music. In this context the size and composition of the string section is less standardised, and usually smaller, than a classical complement. It usually will not include double basses.
