= Hélène Perdriat =

French painter

Hélène Perdriat (1894–1969) was born in La Rochelle, France. She was a painter. When she was 21, Perdriat became very ill with what was thought to be a life-threatening illness. She began painting and painted portraits of herself, her family, and her friends. Following her recovery, she married Thorvald Hellesen, a Norwegian artist. The couple traveled to Oslo where she exhibited her paintings, which were well received. Perdriat continued to exhibit in London, Berlin, New York, Chicago, and Paris despite receiving no formal training. According to Andrea Geyer, she was known for having a distinct and personally poetic style. Her work is included in the Katherine Dreier Collection and other important collections.

She also worked as set designer for the Ballets suédois, for example with the set for Marchand d'Oiseux 1923.

Hélène painted animals, ships, and sailors, but always return to self-images, often incorporating her fantasy characters.
