= Thorvald Hellesen =

Norwegian abstract artist (1888–1937)

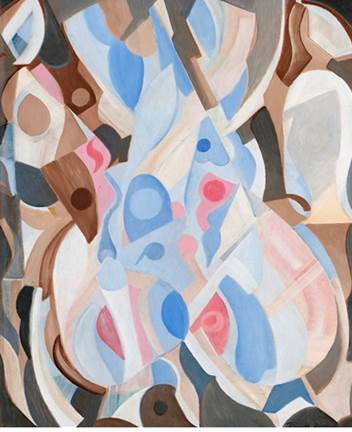
- Abstract Composition
- Born: 25 December 1888; Kristiania (now Oslo), Norway
- Died: 22 October 1937 (aged 48)
- Education: Oslo National Academy of the Arts
- Movement: Abstract, Cubism
- Spouses: Hélène Perdriat (m. 1915, divorced) Guni Mortensen (m. 1937)

Thorvald Hellesen (25 December 1888 – 22 October 1937) was a Norwegian abstract artist, designer and painter, recognized as a pioneering Cubist in Norway. . His art was associated with the Orphic Cubism movement and early non-figurative art. Hellesen is often cited as Norway's first Cubist painter, though his contributions went largely overlooked for decades. In the early 20th century he mingled with leading Parisian avant-garde figures, developing a distinct style that balanced vibrant color and geometric form. By the 2010s and 2020s, renewed scholarly and market interest – including a major 2023 retrospective – brought Hellesen back into the modern art canon, drawing parallels to the posthumous rediscovery of Swedish abstract pioneer Hilma af Klint.

== Biography ==
Thorvald Hellesen (sometimes spelled Thorwald) was born in Kristiania (now Oslo), Norway. He was the son of Thorvald Hellesen, a barrister at the Supreme Court, and Ida Selmer, the daughter of Prime Minister Christian Selmer. He passed the Examen artium, but spent a year at the Norwegian Military Academy before deciding to become an artist.

He then enrolled at the newly created Oslo National Academy of the Arts, where he studied with Christian Krohg. This was followed by a move to Paris in 1912. There, he worked with Fernand Léger and became acquainted with Picasso.

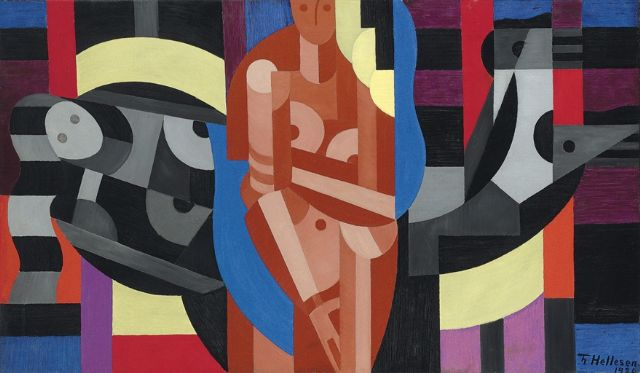
Les deux amies (1920)

=== Career ===
From 1920, Hellesen attended exhibitions in the Salon des Indépendants and the Galerie la Boëtie in Paris. In 1925, he participated at the Exposition Internationale L'Art d'Aujourd'hui in Paris. He would remain in Paris for the next two decades, with occasional visits to Norway and Denmark.

He had held only one exhibition of his works at home in 1919; choosing to exhibit mostly with the Salon des indépendants and the Section d'Or. He appears to have exhibited very little after a major showing of avant-garde art in 1925. In addition to his paintings, he did decorative work, notably at the Sjøfartsbygningen (Maritime Building) in Oslo, as well as designing patterns for textiles and wallpaper.

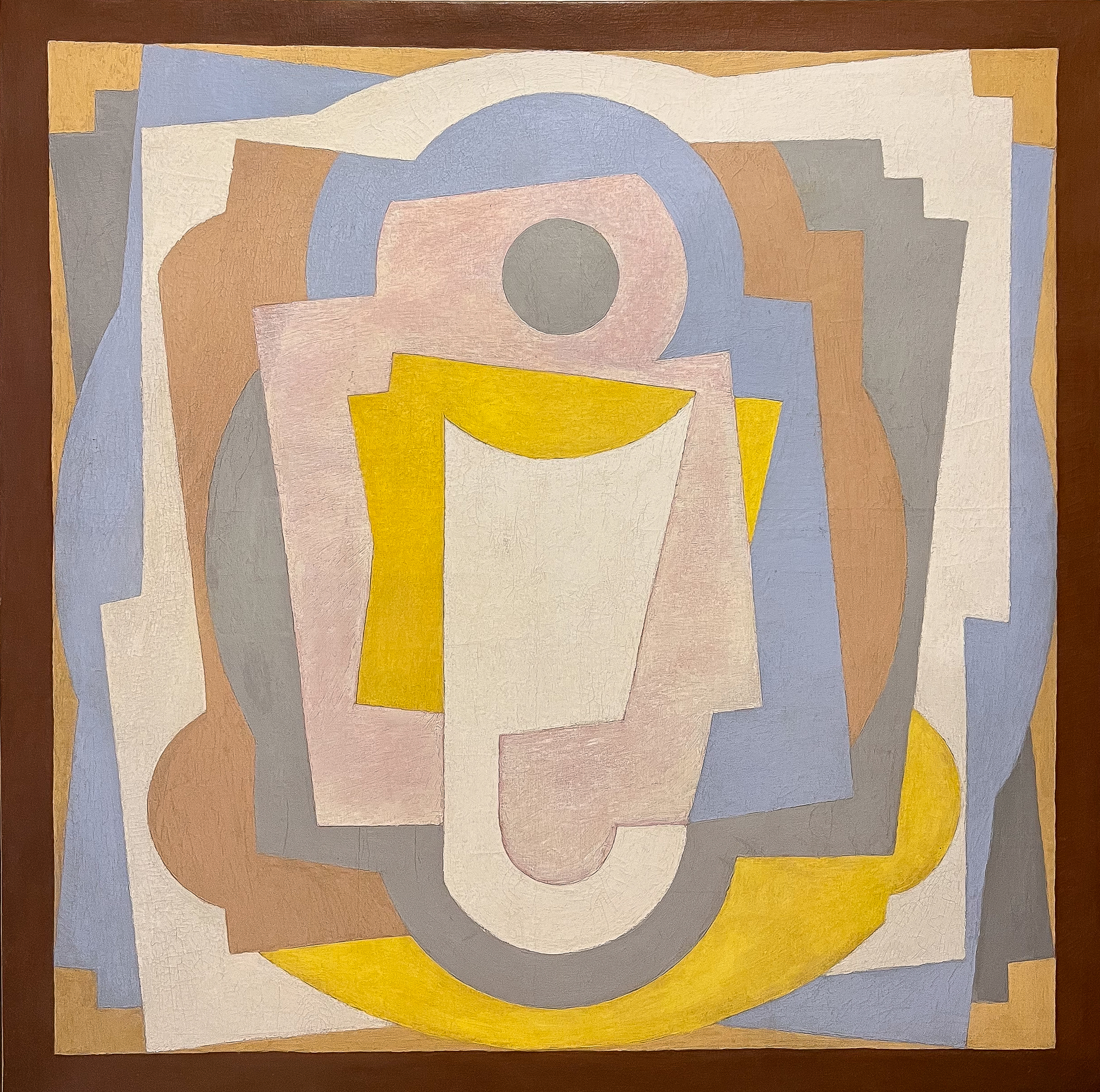
Composition abstraite, c. 1923

He married painter Hélène Perdriat in 1915. The marriage was a troubled one, however, and was eventually dissolved. In 1937, he married his presumed mistress. During the course of that affair, he found himself gradually becoming estranged from the local art community and had to take odd jobs as a movie bit player. In the fall of 1937, after an extended period of poor health, he fell seriously ill and returned home; dying shortly thereafter.

== Posthumous exhibitions ==
After he died, a number of galleries exhibited Hellesen's work, including Galerie 1900-2000, which mounted a career-spanning solo retrospective in 1986 that featured thirty-six works produced between 1915 and 1928. Composition abstraite (circa 1923), pictured above and included in the show's catalogue, was also shown at Salon de Independants.

In November 2023, 85 years following his death, the National Museum of Norway became the first museum to hold an exhibition featuring his work: Thorvald Hellesen. Pioneering Cubism.

== Gallery ==
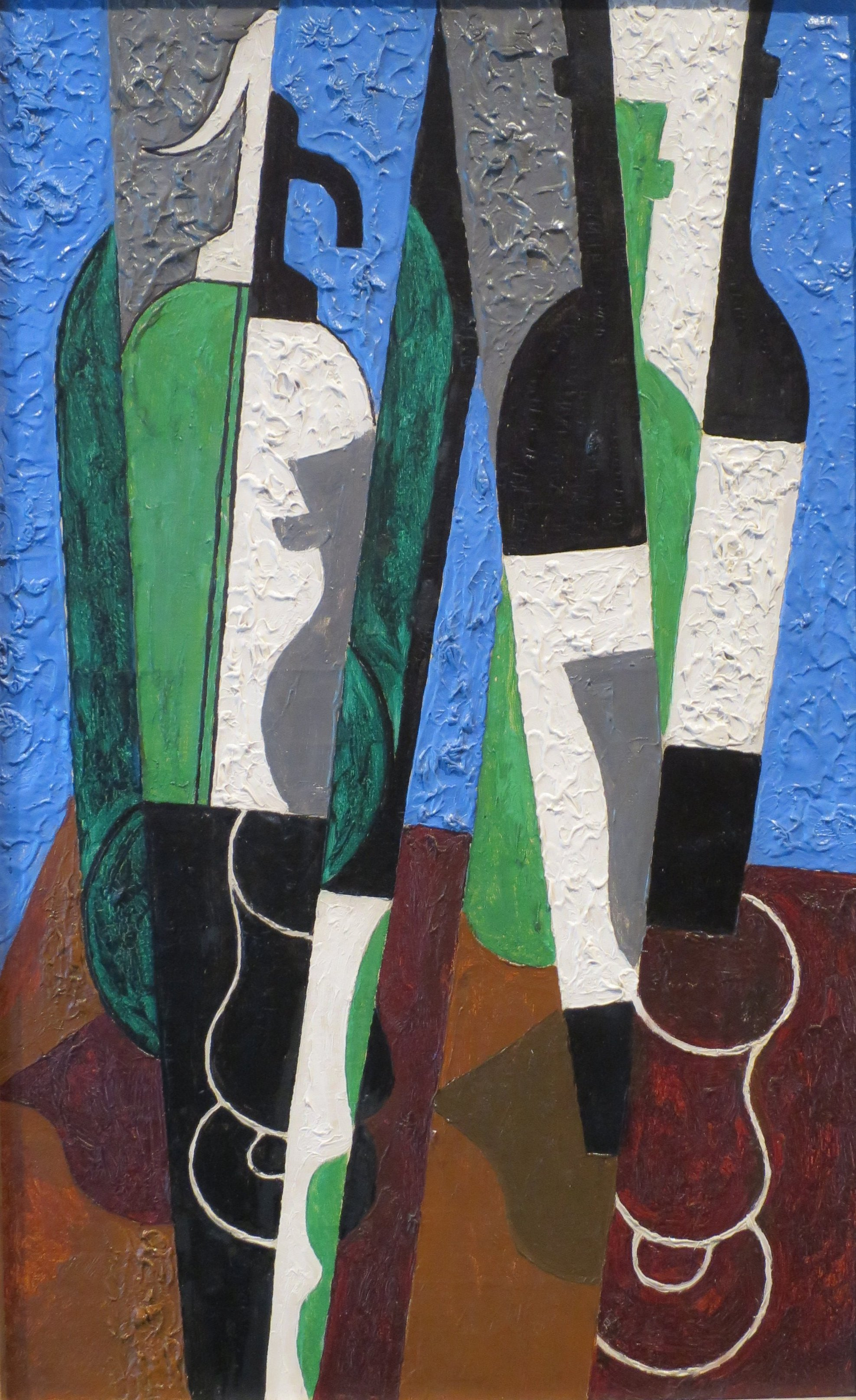
Cubist Still-life

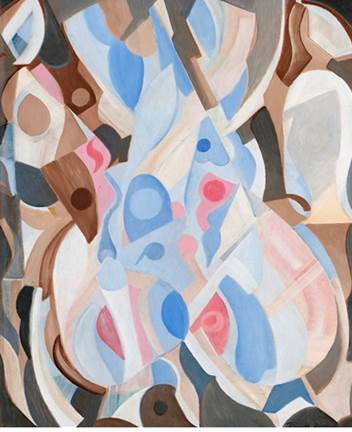
Abstract composition

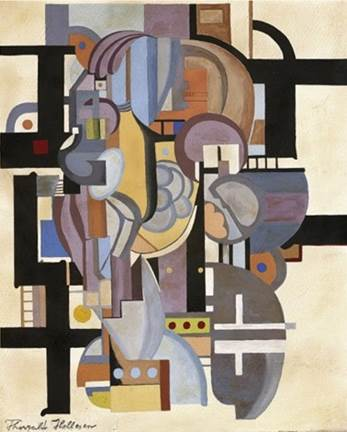
Sketch for a mural

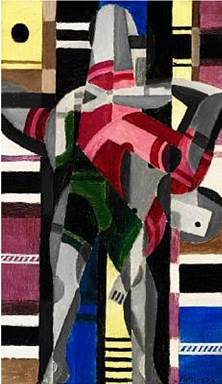
Sketch for a sports hall decoration
