= Entr'acte (film) =

1924 film by René Clair

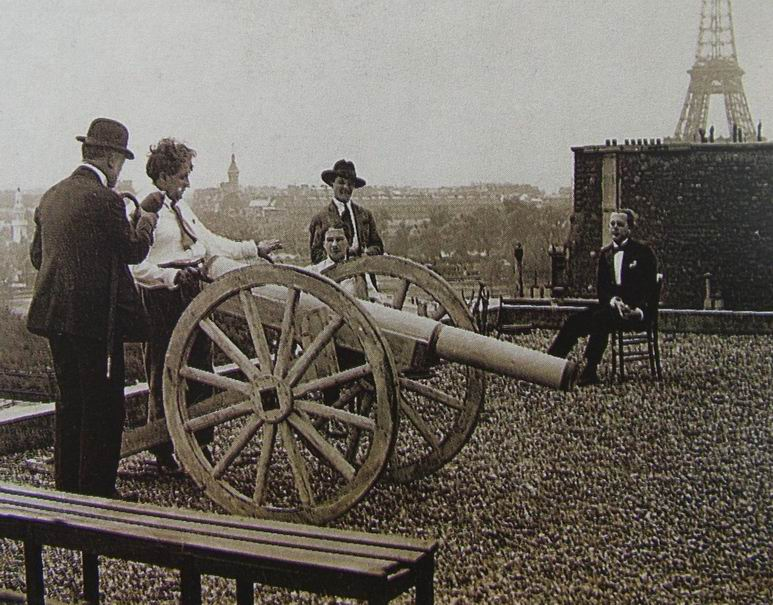
- Erik Satie, Francis Picabia, René Clair, and Jean Börlin in Entr'acte
- Directed by: René Clair
- Written by: René Clair; Francis Picabia
- Produced by: Rolf de Maré
- Starring: Jean Börlin; Inger Frïis; Marcel Duchamp; Man Ray; Francis Picabia; Erik Satie
- Cinematography: Jimmy Berliet
- Music by: Erik Satie
- Distributed by: Société Nouvelle des Acacias
- Release date: 4 December 1924
- Running time: 22 minutes
- Country: France
- Language: French

Entr'acte is a silent French Dada short film directed by René Clair. It premiered on 4 December 1924 at the Théâtre des Champs-Élysées in Paris as a prologue and entr'acte for the Ballets Suédois production of Relâche, based on a book by Francis Picabia, which had settings by Picabia, was produced by Rolf de Maré, and was choreographed by Jean Börlin. The music for both the ballet and the film was composed by Erik Satie.

== Summary ==
=== Prologue ===
On a rooftop, a cannon, via stop motion photography, rolls itself back and forth. In slow motion, two men (Francis Picabia and Erik Satie), jump into the frame and jump up and down. They discuss the cannon and, after smelling a projectile, load it before jumping up and down and jumping out of frame in reverse. The projectile slowly comes out of the cannon toward the camera lens.

=== Entr'acte ===
Images are intercut of Parisian rooftops filmed with the camera tilted at various angles, three dolls with balloons-heads that are inflated and deflated, and a ballet dancer dancing on glass seen from below. Two pairs of white boxing gloves spar over daytime and nighttime images of a city square. Matchsticks arrange themselves on a man's head and ignite, causing him to scratch.

Intercut with images of a rooftop and the city, two men (Marcel Duchamp and Man Ray) play chess on a rooftop until they are blasted away by water. A toy folded-paper boat bobs up and down over bobbing images of rooftops.

More footage of the ballet dancer (Inger Frïis), who is eventually revealed to be wearing pince-nez and a fake beard. Some multiple exposures of male faces.

On a rooftop, a hunter in antiquated clothing (Jean Börlin) points a double-barreled shotgun at an egg-shaped target suspended by string and jostled from below by a stream of water. He shoots the egg, releasing a pigeon, which flies around before landing on his hat. Picabia sees the hunter from another rooftop and shoots him. The hunter falls off the roof.

A group of mourners line up behind a hearse pulled by a dromedary camel. In slow motion, the procession sets off, the well-dressed attendees jumping and skipping along. More footage of the ballet dancer and busy Parisian intersections. The coach becomes separated from the camel and rolls off on its own. The mourners, women and the elderly among them, chase after it as it goes faster and faster. Footage is intercut of automobile traffic and a bicycle race and then a roller coaster ride.

After a frenetic, multiple-exposure montage, the hearse reaches the countryside. The coffin falls off and comes to rest in some grass. The mourners, who have been joined by a man who was out for a run, gradually arrive. They gather around and witness the lid of the coffin open. The hunter, now dressed as a magician, jumps up. Using his magic wand, he makes the coffin, each member of the crowd, and then himself disappear.

A man pokes a hole through the end title card ("Fin") and then jumps through, landing flat on the ground. A foot kicks him in the face, propelling him back through the title card, which, as the footage is reversed, appears to repair itself.

== Production and release ==
For this production, the Dadaists collaborating on the project invented a new mode of production: instantanéisme. The complete film runs for about 20 minutes and uses such techniques as watching people run in slow motion, watching things happen in reverse, looking at a ballet dancer from underneath, watching an egg over a fountain of water get shot and instantly become a bird, and watching people disappear. The cast included cameo appearances by Francis Picabia, Erik Satie, Marcel Duchamp, Man Ray, Jean Börlin (artistic director of the Ballets Suédois), Georges Auric, and Clair himself. The conductor of the orchestra at the premiere was Roger Désormière.

The "Prologue" section runs about 90 seconds (though time indications are approximate, as film and music techniques at the time of the premiere did not allow accurate timing). It was played at the beginning of the ballet, right after the "little overture" ("Ouverturette"), and before the curtain was raised ("Rideau"). The music to this part of the film is called "Projectionnette", and is included as the 2nd item in the Relâche partition. There appears to have been no real effort to synchronize music and action in this part of the film. Probably, the "Projectionnette" music was played two or three times before proceeding to "Rideau".

The "Entr'acte" section runs about 18 minutes and 40 seconds. It was played between the two acts of the ballet. The score for this part of the film is not included in the Relâche partition, but was written down by Satie in a separate score, titled "Cinéma". This part of the music contains "expandable" repeat zones in order to match the start of a new melody with certain events in the film, and, thus, was one of the earliest examples of music to film synchronization. In the score, Satie names 10 sections that are associated with scenes in the film.

In 1974, the film was shown at the Cannes Film Festival.

=== DVD ===
The film was included on the Criterion Collection DVD of Clair's À Nous la Liberté (1931).
