= L'Homme et son désir =

Ballet by Darius Milhaud

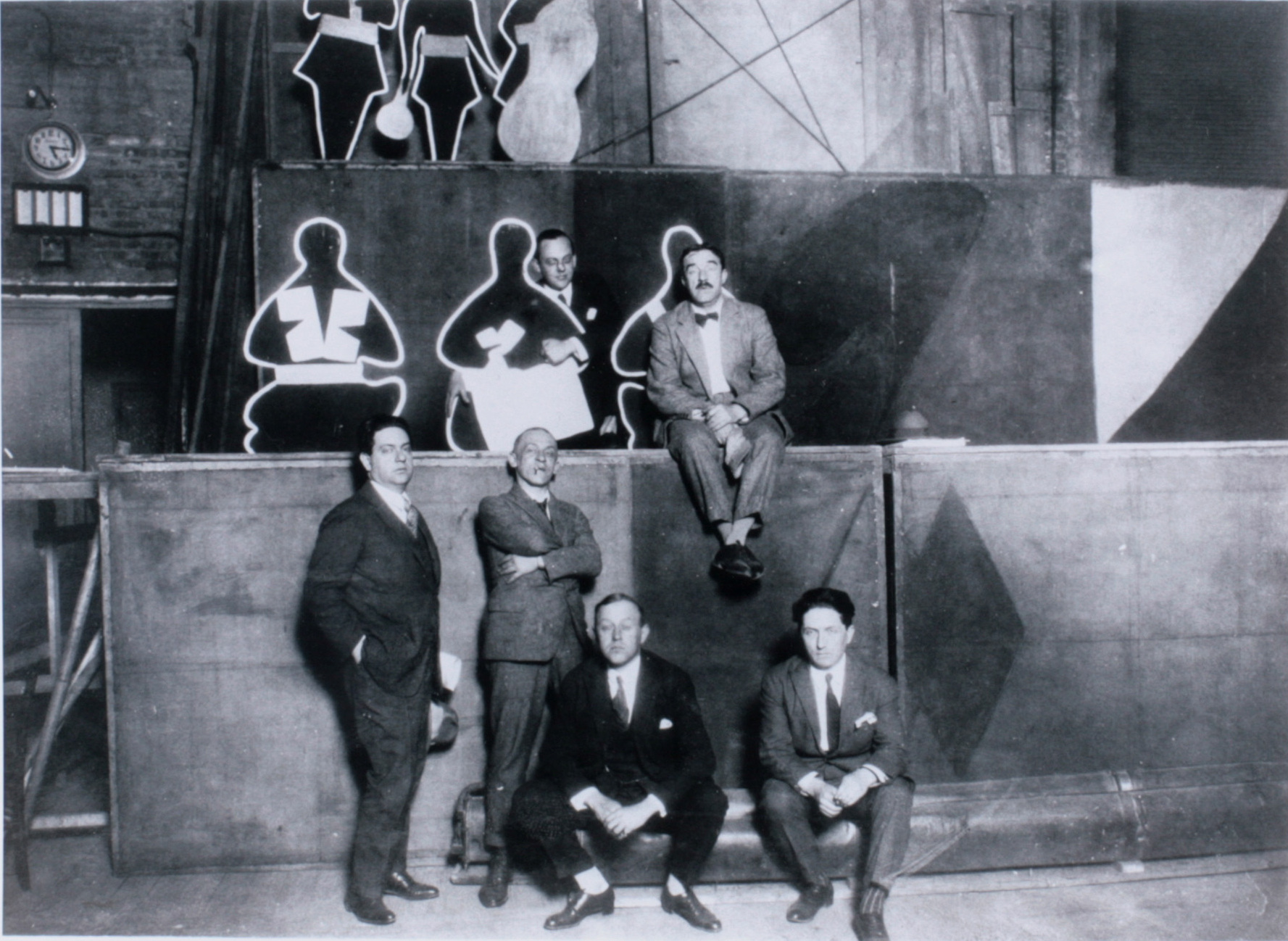
- Music: Darius Milhaud
- Libretto: Paul Claudel
- Premiere: 6 June 1921

L'Homme et son désir, Op. 48, is a ballet composed by Darius Milhaud from 1917–18, based on a scenario of Paul Claudel. It was written in Brazil, where Milhaud had accompanied Claudel as a secretary when the latter was appointed ambassador to Rio de Janeiro.

It was the passage of the Ballets Russes with Vaslav Nijinsky in Rio de Janeiro that triggered it. This was Claudel's first musical collaboration and he then repeated the experience several times with some major works (including Honegger's Jeanne d'Arc au bûcher). The work is also one of Milhaud's first ballets.

The score is written for four voices (wordless) and a small orchestra and a large number of percussion instruments (including a whip and a whistle).

The Premiere took place on 6 June 1921, with a choreography by the Ballets suédois under the orchestral direction of Désiré-Émile Inghelbrecht.

== Structure ==
The ballet is composed of eight parts played as a single movement:

1. Scène I
2. Apparition de la lune
3. L'Homme endormi et le fantôme de la femme morte
4. L'Homme qui dort debout, oscillant comme dans un courant d'eau et comme sans aucun poids
5. Toutes les choses de la forêt qui viennent voir l'homme endormi
6. Danse de la passion
7. Réapparition de la femme qui entraîne l'Homme peu à peu en tournant lentement devant lui sur elle-même
8. La lune I a disparu la première. La lune II disparaît à son tour. Les heures noires se sont écoulées. On voit apparaître les premières heures blanches

A typical performance lasts around 20 minutes.
