= Relâche (ballet) =

1924 ballet by Francis Picabia

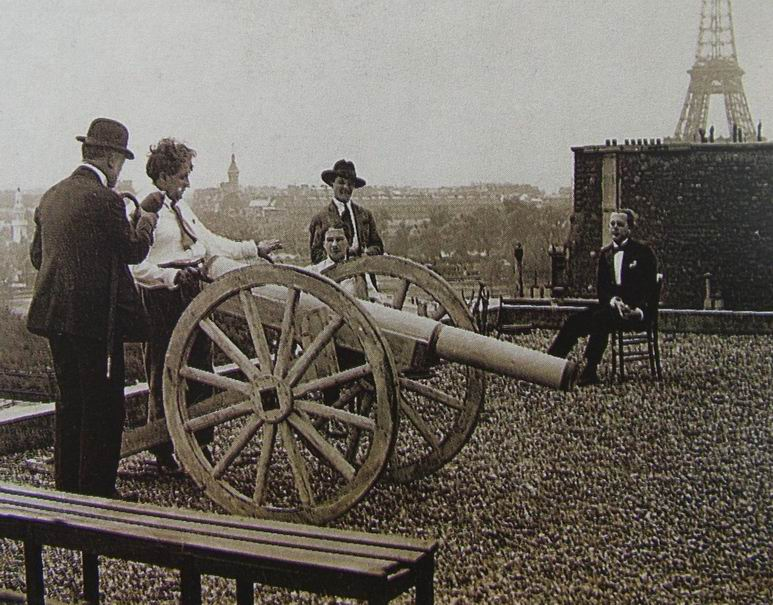
Eric Satie, Francis Picabia, Rene Clair and Jean Biorlin prepare for a November 1924 performance

Relâche is a 1924 "ballet obscène" by Francis Picabia with music composed by Erik Satie.

The title was thought to be a Dadaist practical joke, as relâche is the French word used on posters to indicate that a show is canceled, or the theater is closed. The first performance scheduled for 27 November 1924 was indeed canceled, due to the illness of Jean Börlin, the principal dancer, choreographer, and artistic director of the Ballets Suédois. It went on to be performed 13 times between 4 and 31 December the same year. It was not performed again until 1970, and in 1980 debuted in the United States when it was revived by the Joffrey Ballet in New York, directed by Moses Pendleton.

Picabia commissioned filmmaker René Clair to create a cinematic entr'acte to be shown during the ballet's intermission. The film, simply titled Entr'acte, consists of a scene shown before the ballet and a longer piece between the acts. The nonsensical film features Picabia, Satie, and other well-known artists as actors.

== See also ==
- List of works by Francis Picabia
