= Rolf de Maré =

Swedish art collector

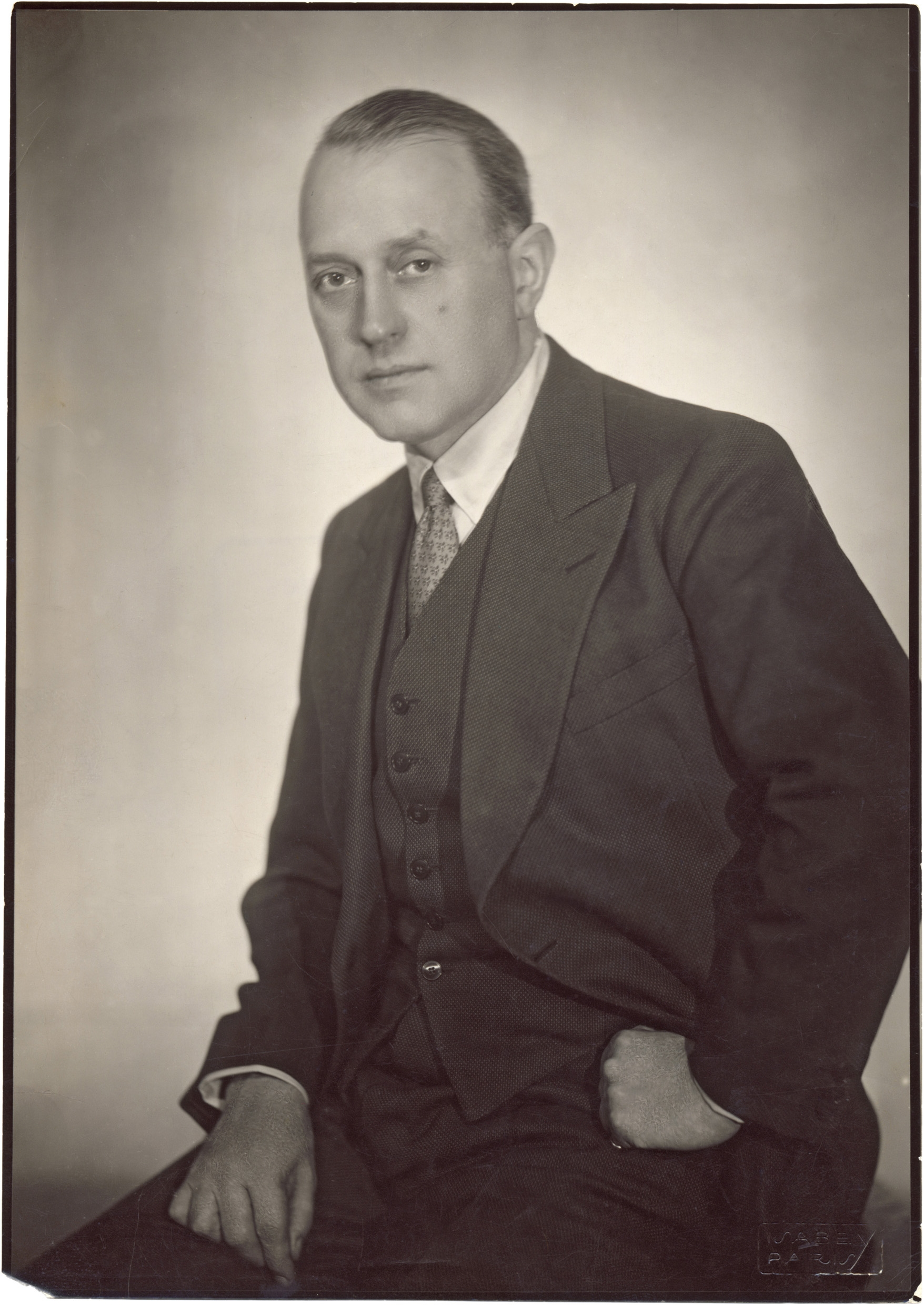
- Rolf de Maré
- Born: 9 May 1888; Stockholm, Sweden
- Died: 28 April 1964 (aged 75); Barcelona, Spain
- Occupations: art collector, ballet leader, museum director
- Years active: 1910s to 1964
- Known for: Ballets Suédois, Les Archives internationales de la Danse

Rolf de Maré (9 May 1888 – 28 April 1964), sometimes called Rolf de Mare, was a Swedish art collector and leader of the Ballets Suédois in Paris in 1920–25. In 1931 he founded the world's first research center and museum for dance in Paris.

== Biography ==
Rolf de Maré was born in Stockholm in 1888 as the son of diplomat Henrik de Maré and sculptor Ellen Roosval von Hallwyl. In 1912 he made friends with Post-Impressionist painter Nils von Dardel who was not particularly well off, but imaginative and talented, while de Maré was enthusiastic and had money.

In 1918, through Dardel, de Maré met Jean Börlin and de Maré became lover and protector of the Swedish dancer.

De Maré created in 1920 the Ballets Suédois at the Théâtre des Champs-Élysées in Paris of which Börlin was first dancer and choreographer. In the autumn of 1924 Giorgio de Chirico curated the scenography and costumes for Pirandello's La Giara.

Börlin died in 1930 and in 1931, de Maré founded Les Archives internationales de la Danse (AID) in Paris in his memory, the world's first museum and research institute for dance. The Archive became a famous centre for studies in dance and visitors came from all over the world to see exhibitions or to study in its vast library. The dance center also published its own magazine and books, arranged lecture demonstrations in the building which de Maré had constructed for his dance centre.

After the World War the archives had grown too large for a private person to maintain, de Maré closed his business in Paris and donated parts of the collections — some 6,000 books, engravings and other items, all concerned mainly with Western dance — to the French government which placed them at the museum and library of the Paris Opera. However, the museum declined to accept two substantial elements of de Maré's collection: firstly, material from the Ballets Suédois, and secondly, the fruits of his expedition of exploration to Indonesia in 1936 — the first to have been undertaken with the purpose of documenting dance.

Therefore, the collection from the Swedish Ballet in Paris and the non-European collections were brought by de Maré to Stockholm to form the Dance Museum, which he opened in 1953 in the basement of the Royal Swedish Opera in Stockholm. On his death he made the Dance Museum the sole heir to his fortune, and this enabled the museum to make further acquisitions.

After dissolving the Ballets Suedois in 1925, de Maré made no attempt to revive its works. The various, concrete collectibles de Maré amassed and that exist today as the bedrock of Stockholm's Dance Museum, illuminate our picture of him as archivist and art collector, all the while they question his role as a connoisseur of a theater based on the art of dancing. Throughout his life, Rolf de Maré was also a distinguished art collector. In the early 1960s, he made an important donation of modernist art to the Moderna Museet. Rolf de Maré died of a stroke in Barcelona in 1964.
