= Jean Börlin =

Swedish dancer and choreographer

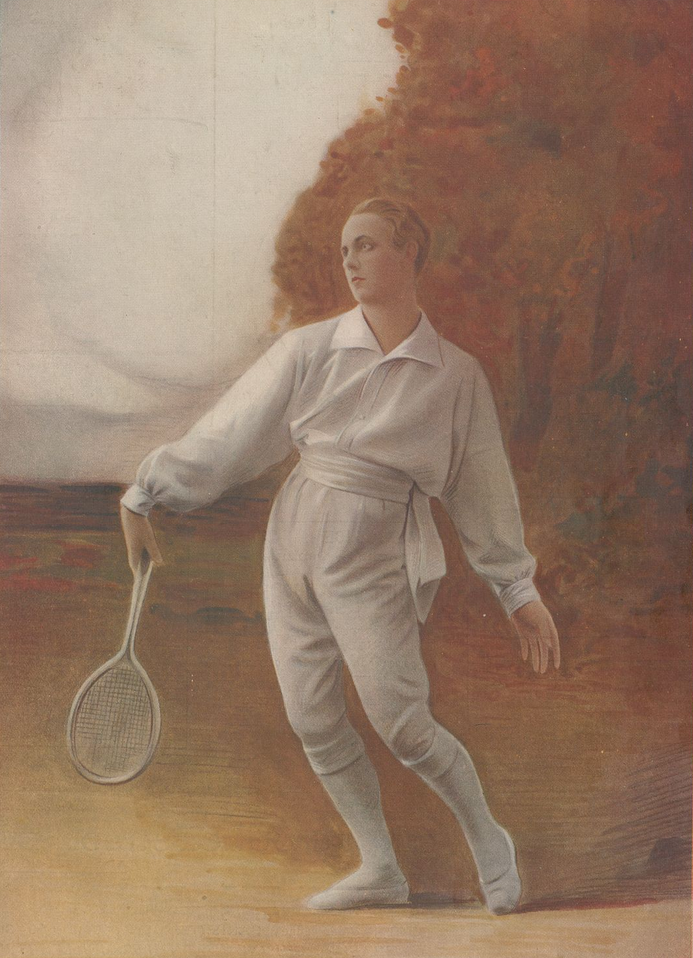
- Born: 13 March 1893; Härnösand, Sweden
- Died: 6 December 1930 (aged 37); New York, US
- Occupations: dancer and choreographer
- Career
- Former groups: Ballets suédois

Jean Börlin (13 March 1893 – 6 December 1930) was a Swedish dancer and choreographer. He worked with Michel Fokine, who was his teacher in Stockholm.

== Biography ==
Jean Börlin was born in Härnösand, Sweden. He was held in high esteem by Michel Fokine, who will later say of the Swedish dancer, "He is the one who looks the most like me! A natural! An ecstasy! The fanatic sacrifice of a bruised body to give the maximum of choreographic expression". Trained at the Royal Swedish Ballet, he joined the troupe in 1905 and was named first dancer by Fokine in 1913. He joined his master in Copenhagen in 1918, then traveled to Europe and discovered modern dance.

Recommended by Fokine, he was recruited for the newly formed Ballets suédois by Rolf de Maré. This marked his first steps as a choreographer; the vast majority of Ballets suédois choreographies bear his name. He danced for the company at a time when it was in constant competition with Sergei Diaghilev's Ballets Russes. From 1920, he became principal dancer, teacher, ballet master and choreographer. Hailed by the French critics, Börlin is considered the successor of Vaslav Nijinsky.

== Personal life ==
Börlin and Rolf de Maré met through their common friend Nils Dardel in 1918, and de Maré became his lover and protector.

Jean Börlin died of organ failure caused by a liver disease in 1930 when he was only 37 years old. Even though he died in New York, he had asked to be buried in Paris, at Père Lachaise Cemetery.

== Main choreographies ==
- 1920 : Sculpture nègre (music by Francis Poulenc, costumes by Paul Colin)
- 1920 : Jeux (music by Claude Debussy, décors by Pierre Bonnard)
- 1920 : Iberia (music by Isaac Albeniz)
- 1920 : Dervishes (music by Alexandre Glazounov)
- 1920 : Nuit de Saint-Jean (music by Hugo Alfven)
- 1920 : Maison de fous (music by Viking Dahl)
- 1920 : Le Tombeau de Couperin (music by Maurice Ravel, décors and costumes by Pierre Laprade)
- 1920 : El Greco (music by Désiré-Émile Inghelbrecht)
- 1920 : Les Vierges folles (music by Kurt Atterberg and Einar Nerman)
- 1921 : La Boîte à joujoux (music by Claude Debussy)
- 1921 : L'Homme et son désir (livret by Paul Claudel, music by Darius Milhaud)
- 1921 : Les Mariés de la tour Eiffel (livret by Jean Cocteau, music by Groupe des Six)
- 1922 : Skating-Rink (livret by Ricciotto Canudo, music by Arthur Honegger, décors and scénographie by Fernand Léger)
- 1923 : Within the Quota (music by Cole Porter, décors and costumes by Gerald Murphy)
- 1923 : Le Marchand d'oiseaux (livret by Hélène Perdriat, music by Germaine Tailleferre)
- 1923 : La Création du monde (livret by Blaise Cendrars, music by Darius Milhaud, décors by Fernand Léger)
- 1924 : Relâche (music by Erik Satie, décors by Francis Picabia)
- 1924 : Le Tournoi singulier (livret by Louise Labé, music by Roland-Manuel)
- 1924 : La Jarre (livret by Luigi Pirandello, music by Alfredo Casella, décors and costumes by Giorgio de Chirico)
- 1929 : Le Cercle éternel (music by Alexandre Tansman, décors and costumes by Serge Gladky)

== Filmography ==
- 1924 : Entr'acte by René Clair
- 1924 : L'Inhumaine by Marcel L'Herbier
- 1924 : Le Voyage imaginaire by René Clair
