= Ballets suédois =

Swedish dance ensemble based in Paris

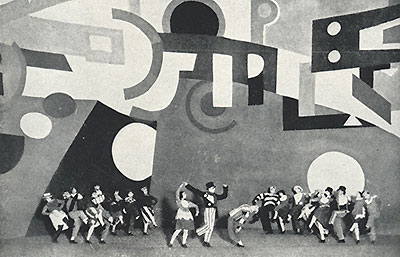
Ballets suédois production of Skating Rink (1922) by Jean Börlin (1893–1930), scenery by Fernand Léger

The Ballets suédois (French pronunciation: [balɛ sɥedwa]; "Swedish Ballets") was a predominantly Swedish dance ensemble based in Paris that, under the direction of Rolf de Maré (1888–1964), performed throughout Europe and the United States between 1920 and 1925, rightfully earning the reputation as a "synthesis of modern art".

The Ballets suédois created pieces that negotiated new terms of the post-World War I European imaginary by combining forms of "dance, drama, painting, poetry, and music with acrobatics, circus, film, and pantomime".

Between 1920 and 1924, the ensemble performed 24 creative pieces, totaling 2,678 performances in 274 cities throughout twelve countries. The collaboration of the choreography of Jean Börlin, the artistic direction of de Maré, and the aesthetic framework of Fernand Léger, provided a rich intercultural cross-section of avant-garde performance in interwar Europe.

The company collaborated with some of the top creative talents in Paris for story creation, set design, and music composition. These included the poets Blaise Cendrars, Paul Claudel, Cocteau and Ricciotti Canudo; the composers Auric, Honegger, Milhaud, Cole Porter, Poulenc and Satie; and the artists de Chirico, Fernand Léger, and Francis Picabia.

Visual design was a strong element in the company's productions, sometimes overpowering the dancing. One of the most striking designs was created by Andrée Parr for L'Homme et son désir (1921). The four-tiered stage was occupied by symbolic figures such as the black-robed Hours of the Night, the Moon, and her reflection. Dancers representing musical instruments (cymbals, bells, and panpipes) wore fanciful headdresses and masks that concealed their faces and gave them the look of abstractions.

Conceived by Cocteau as a satirical celebration of the bourgeois and the banal, Les Mariés de la tour Eiffel (1921) depicted a wedding party set on a terrace of the Eiffel Tower on Bastille Day. A photographer tries to take pictures, but out of his camera emerge an ostrich, a bathing beauty, and a lion; meanwhile, gramophones at either side of the stage comment ironically on the action in the fashion of a Greek chorus. The dancers were encased in elaborate costumes and masks that made it hard for them to hear the music which united the efforts of five members of Les Six: Auric, Honegger, Milhaud, Poulenc, and Germaine Tailleferre.

Börlin's interest in primitive cultures, which was shared by many artists of the early 20th century, inspired La Création du monde (1923). Its source, an African creation myth, was reflected in Milhaud's jazz score and Léger's designs, but most of the choreography was couched in the academic ballet technique. Börlin added a few original touches, however, such as the heron-dancers who moved on stilts.

The company's last production was the Dadaist ballet Relâche (1924), whose title means a cancelled performance. There was no recognizable classical dancing in this ballet, the cast of which included a fireman, an elegant lady, and nine men who at one point doffed their evening clothes to reveal their long underwear. The backdrop, designed by Picabia (who also wrote the scenario), consisted of row upon row of automobile headlamps, which were brightened and dimmed during the performance. René Clair's film Entr'acte, the first to be used in a ballet, was played during the intermission. Following a series of random images, among them the artists Man Ray and Marcel Duchamp playing chess, it culminated with the mock funeral of Börlin, which turns into a comic chase when the hearse runs away.

== Notable productions ==
- 1921: Les Mariés de la tour Eiffel, Paris
- 1923: La Création du monde, with music by Darius Milhaud
- 1924: Relâche, with music by Erik Satie
- A filmed intermission, Entr'acte by René Clair, to be shown with Relâche

== Sources ==
- Nancy Van Norman Baer, Paris Modern: The Swedish Ballet 1920-1925 (San Francisco: Fine Arts Museums of San Francisco, 1995). ISBN 978-0-88401-081-4.
- Felicia McCarren, Dancing Machines: Choreographies of the Age of Mechanical Reproduction (Stanford: Stanford University Press, 2003), pp. 112–129
