= Aïcha Goblet =

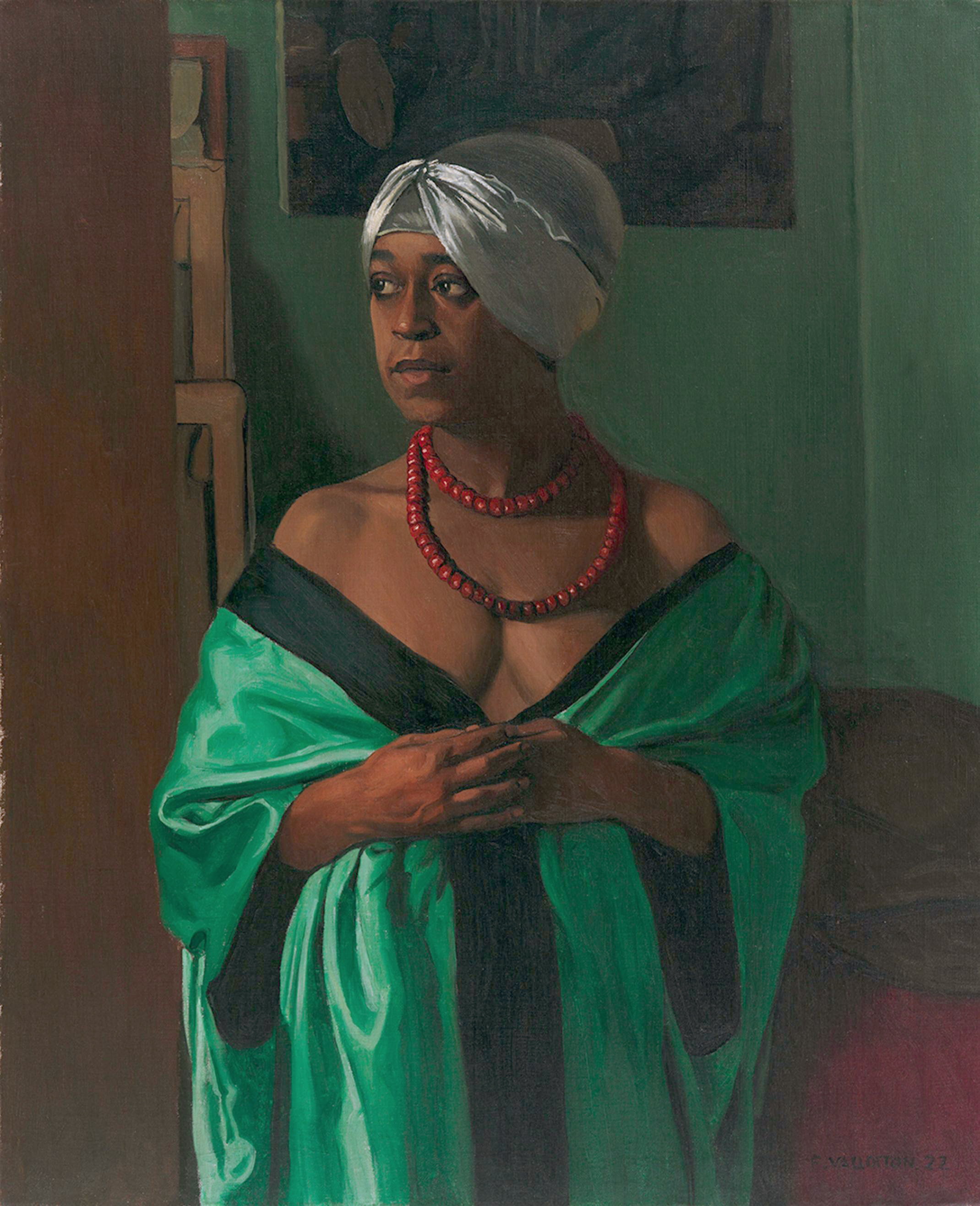
- Born: Madeleine Julie Gobelet; 28 February 1894; Renescure
- Died: 27 June 1972 (aged 78); Paris
- Citizenship: French
- Occupations: Artists' model and dancer
- Known for: Figure of the Années folles in 1920s Paris.

Aïcha Goblet (born Madeleine Julie Gobelet) (28 February 1894 - 27 June 1972) was a French artists' model and dancer, a figure of the Années folles in 1920s Paris.

== Early life ==
Madeleine Julie Gobelet was born on 28 February 1894 at Renescure, a commune in the Nord department in northern France. Her twin brother Henri was born a few hours before her. They were the children of Marthe Joseph Calin and Jules Améry Gobelet. Their father had died in Brazil on 1 September 1893, whilst their mother was pregnant. Their mother travelled back to France a month before the twins' birth. Both parents came from Renescure, and were a domestic servant and day labourer when they married in 1880. Madeleine had an older brother, Jules Charles and two sisters, Marie Antoinette and Marie Julienne, born in 1885 and 1887 in Clairmarais in the Pas-de-Calais.

In 1911, Madeleine settled with her mother and older sister in Nœux-les-Mines. Later, many false or hard-to-verify accounts of her youth were circulated in the press: it was said (or she herself said) that she was born in Hazebrouck or Roubaix, that her parents had ten children, or that she started out as a circus rider at the age of 6. It was suggested that her mother was Flemish, and that her father was South American, Argentinean or from Martinique. In his 1950 book Montparnasse, André Salmon suggested that her father was an artist in a travelling circus. Aïcha later described herself as the only black woman in her family and said that her twin brother was ‘as blond as wheat’.

== Artists' model ==
Goblet recounted different versions of how she became an artists' model in 1911. In one, she was approached in the street in Paris by the painter Jules Pascin, whom she later met again at the Café de l'Ogive; another version claimed that while working in a circus in Clamart, two men approached her and asked her to become a model; she agreed to go to the café du Dôme and meet Pascin there. What is known is that she did become the painter's exclusive model for a time, but never posed nude for him.

After a year, Goblet stopped modelling for Pascin, but remained close to him until his death in 1930. She lived for a time at the Villa Falguière, sculptor Alexandre Falguière's pink villa at no. 14 Cité Falguière, which developed into something of an artists' hotel in 1920s in support of the nearby artists studios. Under the name of Aïcha, she became an icon of Montparnasse, dominated at the time by Alice Prin, alias ‘Kiki’ the unofficial Queen of Montparnasse. She carried a card-case containing cards painted with forget-me-nots and with scalloped gilt edges, engraved with just her name. Other artists of the period took her as their model, including Félix Vallotton, Man Ray, Henri Matisse, Tsuguharu Foujita and Moïse Kisling. Aïsha most often appeared wearing a brightly coloured turban. She also organised numerous debates and meetings, such as the ‘Aïcha dinner’ at La Coupole brasserie.

In 1920, Aïcha inspired the novelist André Salmon to write his novel La Négresse du Sacré-Cœur.

== Performance career ==
That same year, Aïcha began working as a music hall actress and dancer. She appeared in several plays directed by Gaston Baty, alongside the black actor Habib Benglia, with whom she became friends. the plays included Le Simoun (1920), Haya (1922) and À l'ombre du mal (1924) by Henri-René Lenormand. In 1925, in Paul Demasy's play La Cavalière Elsa, based on the novel by Pierre Mac Orlan Aïcha appeared with bare breasts, at a time when nudity was not yet accepted on stage. According to historian Sylvie Chalaye, critics at the time praised her only for ‘her figure and her nudity’. As with Habib Benglia, the press and the public were more interested in her appearance than her acting. In 1928, she appeared nude in Simon Gantillon's Départs, eliciting ambiguous reviews: whilst her performance was praised, it was described through a racist viewpoint and language.

By 1926, Aïcha Goblet was living at 11, rue Jules-Chaplain. She became the companion and model of the painter Samuel Granovsky.

== Later life ==
At the turn of the 1930s, her modelling career over, she continued to frequent the cafés of Montparnasse and recounted her memories to journalists such as Henri Broca and Emmanuel Bourcier.

André Salmon put her in touch with the director of a magazine, who she presented with an outline of her memoirs. Salmon later recounted: "After reading it, he courteously invited Aïcha to come to the studio adjoining the literary office, for the express purpose of stripping off all veils and posing for the camera as simply as she had done in the studio, on the model's board. The result was two fascinating photographs". However, all that emerged from this interview was a short article, illustrated with three nude photographs, published in Mon Paris.

In 1935, Aïcha Goblet appeared in her last play, Hôtel des masques by Albert-Jean. She left Montparnasse for Montmartre, and never returned.

Aïcha Goblet died in 1972, at her home at 100 rue Lamarck in Monmartre, Paris.

== Legacy ==
Michel Fabre has stated that Aïcha Goblet paved the way for Joséphine Baker, as did other black artists such as Lucy (Julie Luce) and her daughter D'al-Al (Simone Luce), despite the obscurity into which they fell in the years after they stopped performing.

In 2018, Villa La Fleur, a private Polish museum, presented portraits of Aïcha Goblet in an exhibition entitled Kobiety Montparnassu (The Women of Montparnasse). The following year, several works depicting Aïcha were included in the exhibition Le Modèle noir, de Géricault à Matisse (The Black Model, from Géricault to Matisse) at the Musée d'Orsay.

== Works featuring Aïcha Goblet ==
(non exhaustive list)

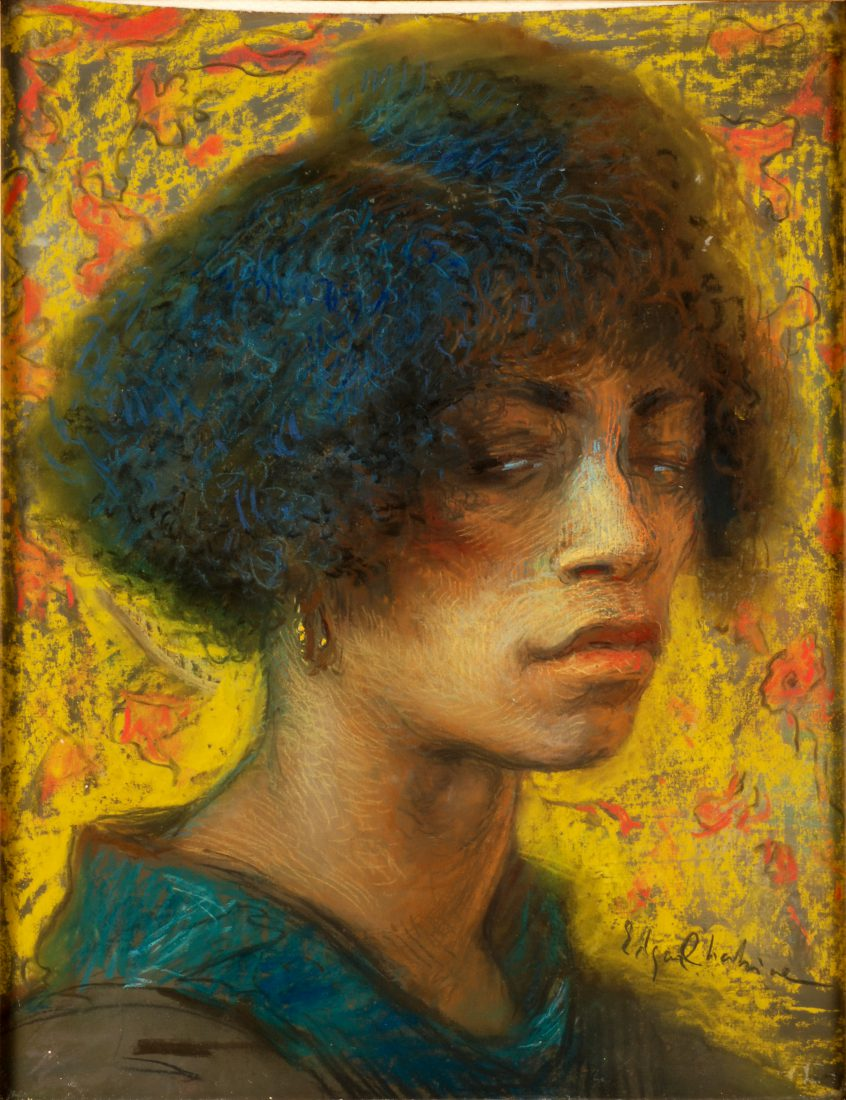
Edgar Chahine, Portrait d'Aïcha, c. 1920, Paris, Musée Arménien de France.

=== Paintings and drawings ===
- Henri Hayden, Portrait d'Aïcha, 1913, oil on canvas, 80.3 x 60 cm, private collection.
- Edgar Chahine, Aïcha, 1913, etching, edition of 50, 36 x 35.7 cm.
- Tsugouharu Foujita, Portrait d'Aïcha, modèle de Montparnasse and various drawings, 1914.
- Henri Matisse, Aïcha et Lorette, 1917, oil on canvas, 37.5 × 46.4 cm, private collection.
- Moïse Kisling, Portrait d'Aïcha, 1919, oil on mahogany panel, 45.3 × 40.5 cm, private collection.
- Henry Ottmann, Courtisane endormie, 1920, oil on canvas, 135.5 × 174.5 cm, Paris, musée national d'Art moderne, inv. LUX.0.143 P.
- Edgar Chahine, Portrait d'Aïcha, c. 1920, pastel, 35 x 27 cm, Paris, Musée arménien de France.
- Félix Vallotton, Aïcha, 1922, oil on canvas, 100 × 81 cm, Hambourg, Kunsthalle de Hambourg, on permanent loan from The Stiftung für die Hamburger Kunstsammlungen, inv. HK-5739.
- Samuel Granovsky, Nude (Aïcha), 1925, pastel on paper, 61 × 79 cm, private collection.
- Samuel Granovsky, Nu de dos, Aïcha, 1926, pastel on paper, 80 × 64 cm, private collection.
- Jacques Mathey, Le Modèle Aïcha, 19??, oil on card, 73 x 91 cm, private collection.
- Kees Van Dongen, Aïcha allongée, 19??, oil on canvas, 50.5 x 79 cm, private collection.

=== Photographs ===
- Man Ray, Le Modèle Aïcha, 1922, private collection.
- Marc Vaux, Portrait d'Aïcha, 19??, Paris, Centre Pompidou-MNAM/CCI-Bibliothèque Kandinsky, fonds Marc Vaux, inv. MV2551.
- Marc Vaux, Portrait d'Aïcha, modèle de Montparnasse (contretype?), 19??, Paris, Centre Pompidou-MNAM/CCI-Bibliothèque Kandinsky, inv. CRE 8.44. Contretype reproduced in Paris Montparnasse, No. 7, 1929, fonds Marc Vaux, Le Verrier box, inv. MV 11816.
- Albert Harlingue, Intérieur d'un café de Montparnasse (Aïcha Goblet in the centre of the image), photograph, circa 1930, Roger-Viollet agency.

=== Sculptures ===
- Cecil Howard, Nubienne, 1912–1913.
- Jeanne Tercafs, Femme malgache, ou La Mulâtresse, or a Portrait d’Aïcha Goblet, c. 1934.

=== Theatre productions ===
- 1920: Le Simoun by Henri-René Lenormand, directed by Gaston Baty, Comédie Montaigne.
- 1922: Haya by Herman Grégoire, Comédie des Champs-Élysées, directed by Gaston Baty: Nyota.
- 1924: À l'ombre du mal by Henri-René Lenormand, directed by Gaston Baty, Studio des Champs-Elysées.
- 1925: La Cavalière Elsa by Paul Demasy, based on the novel by Pierre Mac Orlan, studio des Champs-Élysées: La Deva.
- 1928: Départs by Simon Gantillon, directed by de Gaston Baty, théâtre de l'Avenue.
- 1935: Hôtel des masques d'Albert-Jean, directed by de Gaston Baty, théâtre Montparnasse.

== Bibliography ==
- Emmanuel Bourcier (17 April 1931). "La Vénus de Montparnasse". Paris-Soir: 2.
- Aïcha (June 1936). "Aïcha vous parle". Mon Paris (8): 7–9.
- André Salmon (1950). Montparnasse. Paris: André Bonne. pp. 222–228.
- Jill Berk Jiminez (October 2013). "GOBLET, Aicha". Dictionary of Artists' Models. Routledge. pp. 233–234, 624. ISBN 978-1-135-95921-0. Jiminez2013.

== Documentaries ==
- Montparnasse, by Eugène Deslaw, 1929 (Aïcha Goblet is filmed for a few moments at the end).
- Les Heures chaudes de Montparnasse, documentary series by Jean-Marie Drot, 1963: episode Pascin, l'oublié.
- "Interview d'Aïcha, in L'Art et les hommes : inventaire Montparnasse, émission de Jean-Louis Drot (rushes from the series Les Heures chaudes de Montparnasse, 12 min 33)". Ina MEDIAPRO (in French). 1964.
