= Gaston Baty =

French playwright and theater director (1885–1952)

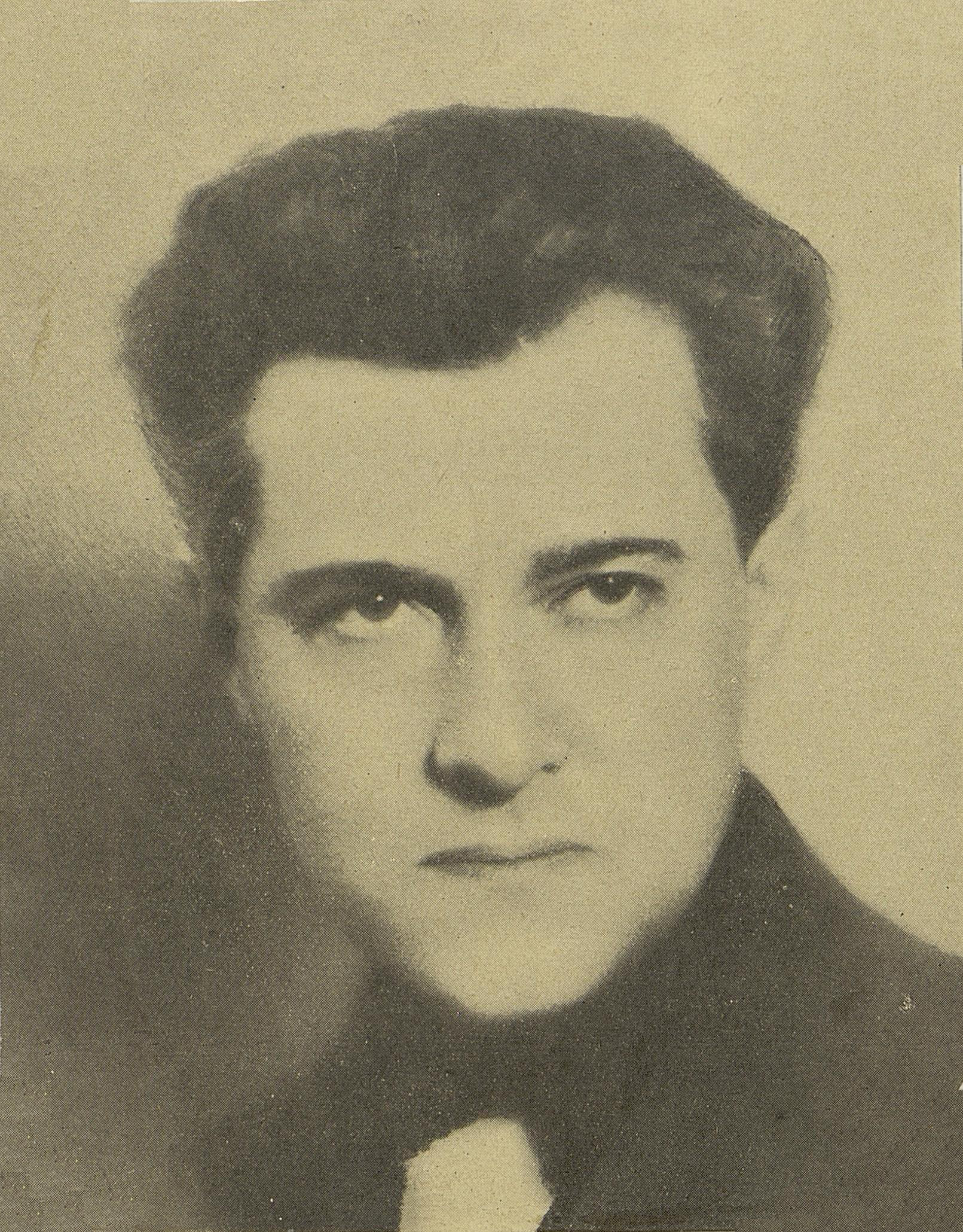
- Born: 26 May 1885
- Died: 13 October 1952 (aged 67)
- Occupations: Playwright and theatre director

Gaston Baty (French pronunciation: [ɡastɔ̃ bati]; 26 May 1885 – 13 October 1952), whose full name was Jean-Baptiste-Marie-Gaston Baty, was a French playwright and theatre director. He was born in Pélussin, Loire, France.

== Career ==
In 1921, Baty formed his own company Les Compagnons de la Chimère [The Companions of the Chimera],^{:157} which mounted productions in a variety of Parisian theatres in the 1920s and 30s.^{:2} He was also a member of Le Cartel des Quatre [The Cartel of Four], a group of four directors in Paris who offered an alternative to both "academic and commercial theatre".^{:178} His stage adaptation of Gustave Flaubert's Madame Bovary was presented in an English translation on Broadway in 1937. Constance Cummings played the title role. Baty is also the author of a play entitled Dulcinea, which has been filmed twice and produced on television in 1989. It is an original play that takes its inspiration from Miguel de Cervantes's great novel Don Quixote and uses some of its characters. The second film version, made in 1963, starred Millie Perkins as Dulcinea, and was released in the U.S. as The Girl from La Mancha. He wrote Vie de l'art théatral, des origines a nos jours in 1932 with René Chavance.

== Theater director ==
- 1919: La Grande Pastorale by Charles Hellem and Pol d'Estoc, Cirque d'hiver

=== 1920–1929 ===
- 1920: Les Esclaves by Saint-Georges de Bouhélier, Théâtre des Arts
- 1920: Le Simoun by Henri-René Lenormand, Comédie Montaigne
- 1921: L'Avare by Molière, Comédie Montaigne
- 1921: 29 degrés à l'ombre by Eugène Labiche, Comédie Montaigne
- 1921: Les Amants puérils by Fernand Crommelynck, Comédie Montaigne
- 1921: Le Héros et le soldat by George Bernard Shaw, Comédie Montaigne
- 1921: L'annonce faite à Marie by Paul Claudel, Comédie Montaigne
- 1921: Haya by Herman Grégoire, Comédie des Champs-Élysées
- 1921: La Belle de Haguenau by Jean Variot, Comédie des Champs-Élysées
- 1922: Césaire by Jean Schlumberger, Comédie des Champs-Élysées
- 1922: La Farce de Popa Ghéorghé by Adolphe Orna, Théâtre des Mathurins
- 1922: Martine by Jean-Jacques Bernard, Théâtre des Mathurins
- 1922: Intimité by Jean-Victor Pellerin, Théâtre des Mathurins
- 1922: Le Voyageur by Denys Amiel, Baraque de la Chimère, Saint-Germain-en-Laye
- 1922: Je veux revoir ma Normandie by Lucien Besnard, Baraque de la Chimère, Saint-Germain-en-Laye
- 1922: Cyclone by Simon Gantillon, Baraque de la Chimère, Saint-Germain-en-Laye
- 1922: L'Aube et le soir de Sainte-Geneviève by Marie Diemer, Baraque de la Chimère, Saint-Germain-en-Laye
- 1923: La Souriante Madame Beudet by Denys Amiel and André Obey, Théâtre de l'Odéon
- 1923: The Emperor Jones by Eugene O'Neill, Théâtre de l'Odéon
- 1923: Le Voile du souvenir by Henri Turpin and Pierre-Paul Fournier, Théâtre de l'Odéon
- 1924: L'Invitation au voyage by Jean-Jacques Bernard, Théâtre de l'Odéon
- 1924: Le Fardeau de la liberté by Tristan Bernard, Théâtre de l'Odéon
- 1924: Alphonsine by Paul Haurigot, Théâtre du Vaudeville
- 1924: Parades by Thomas Gueullette, Studio des Champs-Élysées
- 1924: Maya by Simon Gantillon, Studio des Champs-Élysées
- 1924: À l'ombre du mal by Henri-René Lenormand, Studio des Champs-Élysées
- 1925: Miss Julie by August Strindberg, Studio des Champs-Élysées
- 1925: Déjeuner d'artistes by Jean Gaument and Camille Cé, Studio des Champs-Élysées
- 1925: L'Étrange Épouse du professeur Stierbecke by Albert-Jean, Studio des Champs-Élysées
- 1925: La Cavalière Elsa by Paul Demasy after Pierre Mac Orlan
- 1925: La Chapelle ardente by Gabriel Marcel, Théâtre du Vieux-Colombier
- 1925: Fantaisie amoureuse by André Lang, Théâtre du Vieux-Colombier
- 1926: Le Dompteur ou l'anglais tel qu'on le mange by Alfred Savoir, Théâtre Michel
- 1926: Le Couvre-feu by Albert Boussac de Saint-Marc, Studio des Champs-Élysées
- 1926: L'Homme du destin by George Bernard Shaw, Studio des Champs-Élysées
- 1926: Le Bourgeois romanesque by Jean Blanchon, Studio des Champs-Élysées
- 1926: Une visite by Anne Valray, Studio des Champs-Élysées
- 1926: Têtes de rechange by Jean-Victor Pellerin, Studio des Champs-Élysées
- 1926: Les Chevaux du char by Jacques de Zogher, Théâtre Antoine
- 1926: L'Amour magicien by Henri-René Lenormand, Studio des Champs-Élysées
- 1927: Almicar by Philippe Fauré-Frémiet, Studio des Champs-Élysées
- 1927: La Machine à calculer by Elmer Rice, Studio des Champs-Élysées
- 1928: The Dybbuk by S. Ansky, Studio des Champs-Élysées
- 1928: Cris des cœurs by Jean-Victor Pellerin, Théâtre de l'Avenue
- 1928: Le Premier Hamlet by Shakespeare, Théâtre de l'Avenue
- 1928: Départ by Simon Gantillon, Théâtre de l'Avenue
- 1929: Le Malade imaginaire by Molière, Théâtre de l'Avenue
- 1929: La Voix de sa maîtresse by Charles Oulmont and Paul Masson, Théâtre de l'Avenue
- 1929: Karl et Anna by Leonhard Frank, Théâtre de l'Avenue

=== 1930–1939 ===
- 1930: Feu du ciel by Pierre Dominique, Théâtre Pigalle
- 1930: Le Simoun by Henri-René Lenormand, Théâtre Pigalle
- 1930: The Threepenny Opera by Bertolt Brecht, Théâtre Montparnasse
- 1930: Le Médecin malgré lui by Molière, Théâtre Montparnasse
- 1930: Le Sourd ou l'auberge pleine by Pierre Jean Baptiste Choudard Desforges, Théâtre Montparnasse
- 1931: Terrain vague by Jean-Victor Pellerin, Théâtre Montparnasse
- 1931: Beau Danube rouge by Bernard Zimmer, Théâtre Montparnasse
- 1932: Bifur by Simon Gantillon, Théâtre Montparnasse
- 1932: Café-Tabac by Denys Amiel, Théâtre Montparnasse
- 1932: As You Desire Me by Luigi Pirandello, Théâtre Montparnasse
- 1933: Crime and punishment after Dostoievsky, Théâtre Montparnasse
- 1934: Voyage circulaire by Jacques Chabannes, Théâtre Montparnasse
- 1934: Prosper by Lucienne Favre, Théâtre Montparnasse
- 1935: Hôtel des masques by Albert-Jean, Théâtre Montparnasse
- 1935: Les Caprices de Marianne by Alfred de Musset, Théâtre Montparnasse
- 1936: Madame Bovary after Gustave Flaubert, Théâtre Montparnasse
- 1937: Les Ratés by Henri-René Lenormand, Théâtre Montparnasse
- 1937: Faust by Goethe, Théâtre Montparnasse
- 1937: Le Chandelier by Alfred de Musset, Comédie-Française
- 1937: Madame Capet by Marcelle Maurette, Théâtre Montparnasse
- 1938: The Italian Straw Hat by Eugène Labiche and Marc-Michel, Comédie-Française
- 1938: Arden de Feversham by Henri-René Lenormand, Théâtre Montparnasse
- 1938: Dulcinée by Gaston Baty, Théâtre Montparnasse
- 1939: Manon Lescaut by Marcelle Maurette after abbé Prévost, Théâtre Montparnasse

=== 1940–1949 ===
- 1940: Phèdre by Jean Racine, Théâtre Montparnasse
- 1940: Un garçon de chez Véry by Eugène Labiche, Théâtre Montparnasse
- 1941: Marie Stuart by Marcelle Maurette, Théâtre Montparnasse
- 1941: The Taming of the Shrew by Shakespeare, Théâtre Montparnasse
- 1942: Macbeth by Shakespeare, Théâtre Montparnasse
- 1944: Le Grand Poucet by Claude-André Puget, Théâtre Montparnasse
- 1944: La Queue de la poële by Gaston Baty, Marionnettes de Gaston Baty
- 1944: Emily Brontë by Madame Simone, Théâtre Montparnasse
- 1945: Lorenzaccio by Alfred de Musset, Théâtre Montparnasse
- 1946: Berenice by Racine, Comédie-Française
- 1946: Arlequin poli par l'amour by Marivaux, Comédie-Française
- 1947: L'Amour des trois oranges by Alexandre Arnoux, Théâtre Montparnasse
- 1948: Sapho by Alphonse Daudet and Auguste Bélot, Comédie-Française
- 1948: La Langue des femmes by Jean-Baptiste Marie and La Marjolaine by Gaston Baty, puppets by Gaston Baty, Salle des Archives Internationales de la danse
- 1948: Au temps où Berthe filait by Marcel Fabry, puppets by Gaston Baty, Salle des Archives Internationales de la danse
- 1949: L'Inconnue d'Arras by Armand Salacrou, Comédie-Française
- 1949: La Tragique Et Plaisante Histoire du Docteur Faust by Gaston Baty, puppets by Gaston Baty

=== 1950–1959 ===
- 1952: Les Caprices de Marianne by Alfred de Musset, Comédie de Provence Casino municipal in Aix-en-Provence
- 1952: Phèdre by Jean Racine, Comédie de Provence Casino municipal in Aix-en-Provence
- 1952: Le Médecin malgré lui by Molière, Comédie de Provence Casino municipal in Aix-en-Provence
- 1952: Arden de Feversham by Henri-René Lenormand, Comédie de Provence Casino municipal in Aix-en-Provence
- 1953: Le Chandelier by Alfred de Musset, Comédie de Provence Théâtre du Gymnase (Marseille)
- 1957: Faust by Goethe, Théâtre Montparnasse
