= Jean Loysel =

French composer and lyricist

- Born: Auguste Georges Schmutz; 23 October 1889; Brest
- Died: 29 December 1962 (aged 73)
- Other names: Composer; Lyricist

Auguste Georges Schmutz, called Jean Loysel, (23 October 1889 – 29 December 1962) was a 20th-century French composer and lyricist.

He is mostly known for the duet he formed in the 1920s and 1930s with Georges Matis as lyricist or composer.

After the war, he also collaborated (as a lyricist) with Rolf Marbot (1906–1974), Bert Reisfeld's alter ego.

He also worked with Henri Salvador.

== Works ==
(selection)

- L'Araignée au plafond, musical comedy (20 December 1928), libretto by Albert-Jean; lyrics by Jean Loysel; music by Jean Loysel and Georges Matis. Reprint ISMN 979-004501422-3
- Popaul, three-act operetta.
- Chanson de l'orang-outang, 1929
- Caravane dans la nuit, music by Louis Gasté, recorded among others by Line Renaud, Armand Mestral, from Perle du Bengal, opérette "féérique et nautique", 1954
