= Georges Matis =

Georges Matis (18.. – 18 November 1967) was a 20th-century French Singer-songwriter and pianist.

He is mostly remembered for the duet he formed with Jean Loysel in the 1920s and 1930s as lyricist or composer.

== Works ==
(selection)

- L'Araignée au plafond, musical comedy (20 December 1928), libretto by Albert-Jean; lyrics by Jean Loysel; music by Jean Loysel and Georges Matis. Reedition ISMN 979-004501422-3
- Le Tour d'horizon de René Dorin
- Le Français mesuré
- Le Bouc à Nanon
- La Première Fois valse [for voice and piano]
- Mimi, voici la fin du mois, valse tendre
- L'Oubliée
- Y en a des... java [for voice and piano]
- Y a des parasites
- Tout est relatif [for voice and piano]
- Théoriquement mélodie [for voice and piano]
- Ah ! Les fraises et les framboises by Serge Plaute, E. Wollf and Georges Matis (old song revived in 1926)
