= Servier (disambiguation) =

- Servier Laboratories
- André Servier, Algerian-born French historian
- H. Servier, French composer
- Serviers-et-Labaume, a commune in southern France
