= Marie Kalff =

Dutch actress (1874–1959)

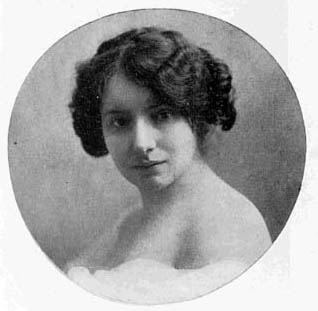
- Marie Kalff, from a 1912 publication
- Born: Johanna Maria Kalff; July 29, 1874; Amsterdam, Netherlands
- Died: October 19, 1959 (aged 85); Paris, France
- Other name: Marie Lenormand (after marriage)
- Occupation: Actress
- Spouse: Henri-René Lenormand
- Relatives: René Lenormand (father-in-law)

Marie Kalff (born Johanna Maria Kalff; 29 July 1874 – 19 October 1959), was a Dutch-born actress, based in Paris.

== Early life ==
Kalff was born in Amsterdam, the daughter of Antonius Kalff and Ellegonda Duranda Rutgers van der Loeff. Her father was a bank director and merchant. She spent some of her childhood in Java, where her father was working.

== Career ==
Kalff moved to Paris and was an actress at the Théâtre Antoine-Simone Berriau and the Théâtre de l'Œuvre there. She was seen regularly on the Paris stage from 1904 to 1929, and was noted especially for interpreting the works of Paul Claudel for the stage. She was also Claudel's confidante. Her gowns were also admired, and featured in theatre magazines.

Kalff also appeared in two silent films directed by Émile Couzinet, La poupée japonaise (1911, short) and L'auberge sanglante (1913), and in one sound picture, Le Bout de la route (1949). In 1950 she traveled to California with her husband, while he was giving a series of lectures on French drama.

Dutch artist Kees van Dongen painted Kalff's portrait in 1905, with the title "Le peignoir rose". The painting sold at Christie's in 2014 for €169,500.

== Personal life ==
Kalff married French playwright Henri-René Lenormand. Lenormand died in 1951; Kalff died in 1959. She left a collection of papers to the Bibliothèque de l'Arsenal.
