= George Lambert (VC) =

Irish Victoria Cross recipient (1819–1860)

- Born: 16 December 1819; Markethill, County Armagh, Ireland
- Died: 10 February 1860 (aged 40); Sheffield, West Riding of Yorkshire, England
- Burial place: Wardsend Cemetery, Sheffield
- Military career
- Allegiance: United Kingdom
- Branch: British Army
- Rank: Lieutenant
- Units: 84th Regiment of Foot
- Conflicts: Indian Mutiny
- Awards: Victoria Cross

George Lambert VC (16 December 1819 – 10 February 1860), born in Markethill, County Armagh, was an Irish recipient of the Victoria Cross, the highest and most prestigious award for gallantry in the face of the enemy that can be awarded to British and Commonwealth forces.

He was 37 years old, and a Sergeant-Major in the 84th Regiment of Foot (later the 2nd Battalion, York and Lancaster Regiment), British Army during the Indian Mutiny when the following deeds took place at Onao, Bithoor and Lucknow for which he was awarded the VC:

84th Regiment. Serjeant-Major George Lambert

Date of Acts of Bravery, 29th July, 16th August, and 25th September, 1857

For distinguished conduct, at Onao, on the 29th of July; at Bithoor, on the 16th of August; and at Lucknow, on the 25th of September.

(Extract from Field Force Orders of the late Major-General Havelock, dated 17th October, 1857.)

He later achieved the rank of lieutenant. He died in Sheffield on 10 February 1860 and was buried at Wardsend Cemetery in the city.

His Victoria Cross is displayed at The York and Lancaster Regiment Museum, Rotherham, South Yorkshire.
