= Dominique Frémy =

French encyclopedist (1931–2008)

- Born: May 5, 1931; Paris, France
- Died: October 2, 2008 (aged 77); Paris, France
- Resting place: Cimetiere de Passy, Paris, France

Dominique Frémy (5 May 1931 – 2 October 2008) was the creator of the Quid encyclopedia. His spouse Michèle and son Fabrice participated in writing it as well. Frémy attended the Cours Hattemer, a private school. He was a diplomaed student of the Institut d'Études Politiques de Paris (English: Paris Institute of Political Studies) and of the Faculté des lettres de Paris. He was employed by Shell in London, but quit his job to produce the Quid encyclopedia with his wife.
