= Arthur Herbert Procter =

English recipient of the Victoria Cross

Squadron Leader The Reverend Arthur Procter VC
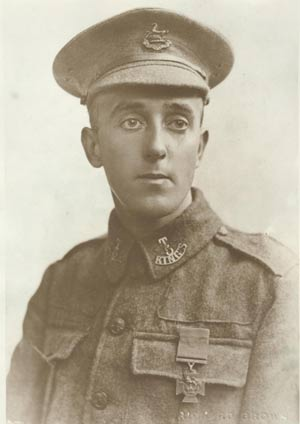
- Born: 11 August 1890; Bootle, Lancashire, England
- Died: 27 January 1973 (aged 82); Sheffield, Yorkshire, England
- Burial place: Sheffield Cathedral (cremated at City Road Cemetery in Sheffield)
- Military career
- Allegiance: United Kingdom
- Branch: British Army; Royal Air Force
- Service years: 1914–1918 (Army); 1941–1946 (Air Force)
- Rank: Private (Army); Squadron leader (Air Force)
- Units: The King's (Liverpool) Regiment; RAF Chaplains Department
- Conflicts: First World War; Second World War
- Awards: Victoria Cross

Arthur Herbert Procter VC (11 August 1890 – 27 January 1973) was an English recipient of the Victoria Cross, the highest and most prestigious award for gallantry in the face of the enemy that can be awarded to British and Commonwealth forces.

== Early life and family ==
He was born in 1890, son of Arthur Richard Procter and his wife Ellen Cumpsty. He was educated at schools in Port Sunlight and Exeter. Beginning employment at Liverpool Corn Exchange, he was a clerk in the provision trade from 1904 until 1914, when in November he enlisted in the King's Liverpool Regiment after the outbreak of the First World War.

In 1917 Procter married Hilda May Codd in Birkenhead. The couple had three sons.

== Award ==
He was 25 years old, and a private in the 1/5th Battalion, the King's Regiment (Liverpool) (part of the 55th (West Lancashire) Division, British Army during the First World War when the following deed took place for which he was awarded the VC.

On 4 June 1916 near Ficheux, France, Private Procter noticed some movement on the part of two wounded men who were lying in full view of the enemy about 15 yards in front of the trenches. He at once went out on his own initiative and, although heavily fired at, ran and crawled to the two men, got them under cover of a small bank dressed their wounds and promised that they would be rescued after dark. He left them with warm clothing and then returned to the trenches, again being heavily fired at. The men were rescued at dusk.

Procter was the first British soldier to be decorated with the VC on the battlefield.

== Further information ==
After demobilisation in 1919, he returned to the provision trade where he worked as a salesman until 1926, when he took up full-time study for Church of England ministry at St Aidan's College, Birkenhead.

He was ordained a deacon in 1927 and priest in 1928, while serving a curacy at St Mary's, Prescot, Lancashire. From 1931 to 1933 he was Vicar of Bosley, and of St Stephen's, Flowery Field, Hyde, (both then in Cheshire) from 1933 to 1944.

In the Second World War he served as a chaplain in the Royal Air Force from 1941 to 1946. His son Cecil was lost in action as RAF aircrew over the North Sea in July 1941.

After the war he was successively Rector of St Mary, Droylsden, Manchester, from 1946 to 1951; Vicar of Claybrooke with Wibtoft, Leicestershire from 1951 to 1963, and of Bradworthy, Devon from 1963 to 1964. After retiring from full-time ministry, he lived in the later 1960s at Shrewsbury, Shropshire, where he was chaplain to the town's British Legion branch and in 1966 he was one of seven winners of the VC who were invited by the Minister of Defence to attend the 50th anniversary Battle of the Somme celebrations in France. He later moved to Sheffield.

He died on 27 January 1973, aged 82, in Sheffield. He was cremated at Sheffield Crematorium in City Road and his ashes buried in All Saints Chapel at Sheffield Cathedral.

== Legacy ==
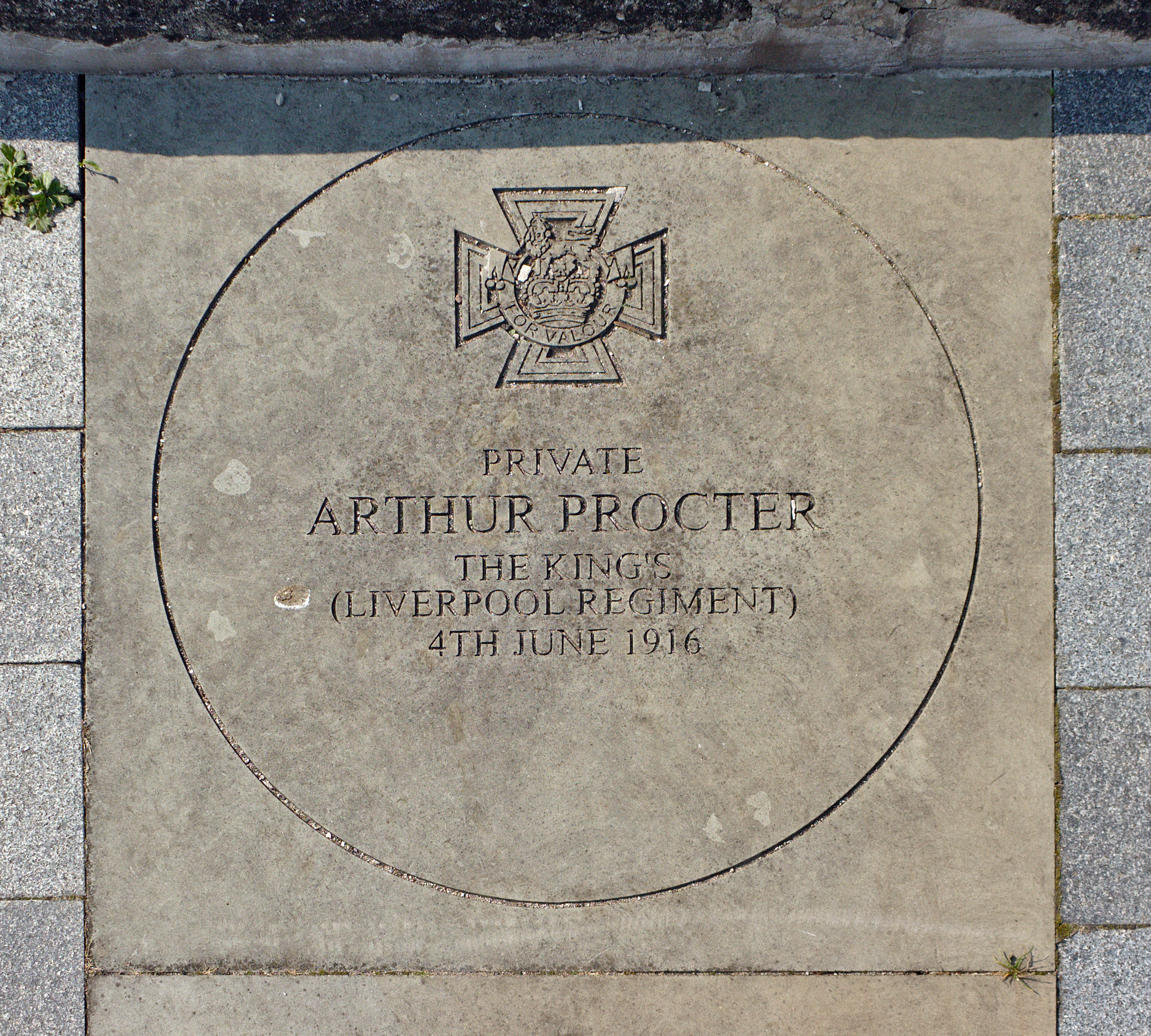
Paving stone memorial in front of the Birkenhead Cenotaph.

Blue plaques have been erected to him by Tameside Metropolitan Borough Council at St Mary's Church, Droylsden, and St Stephen's Church, Hyde.

His Victoria Cross is displayed at the Museum of the King's Regiment, Liverpool, England.

== Bibliography ==
- Gliddon, Gerald (2004) [2012]. VCs of the First World War: Cambrai 1917. The History Press. ISBN 978-0-75-247668-1.
- Murphy, James (2008). Liverpool VCs. Pen and Sword Books. ISBN 978-1844157808.
