= Wardsend Cemetery =

Cemetery in Sheffield, England

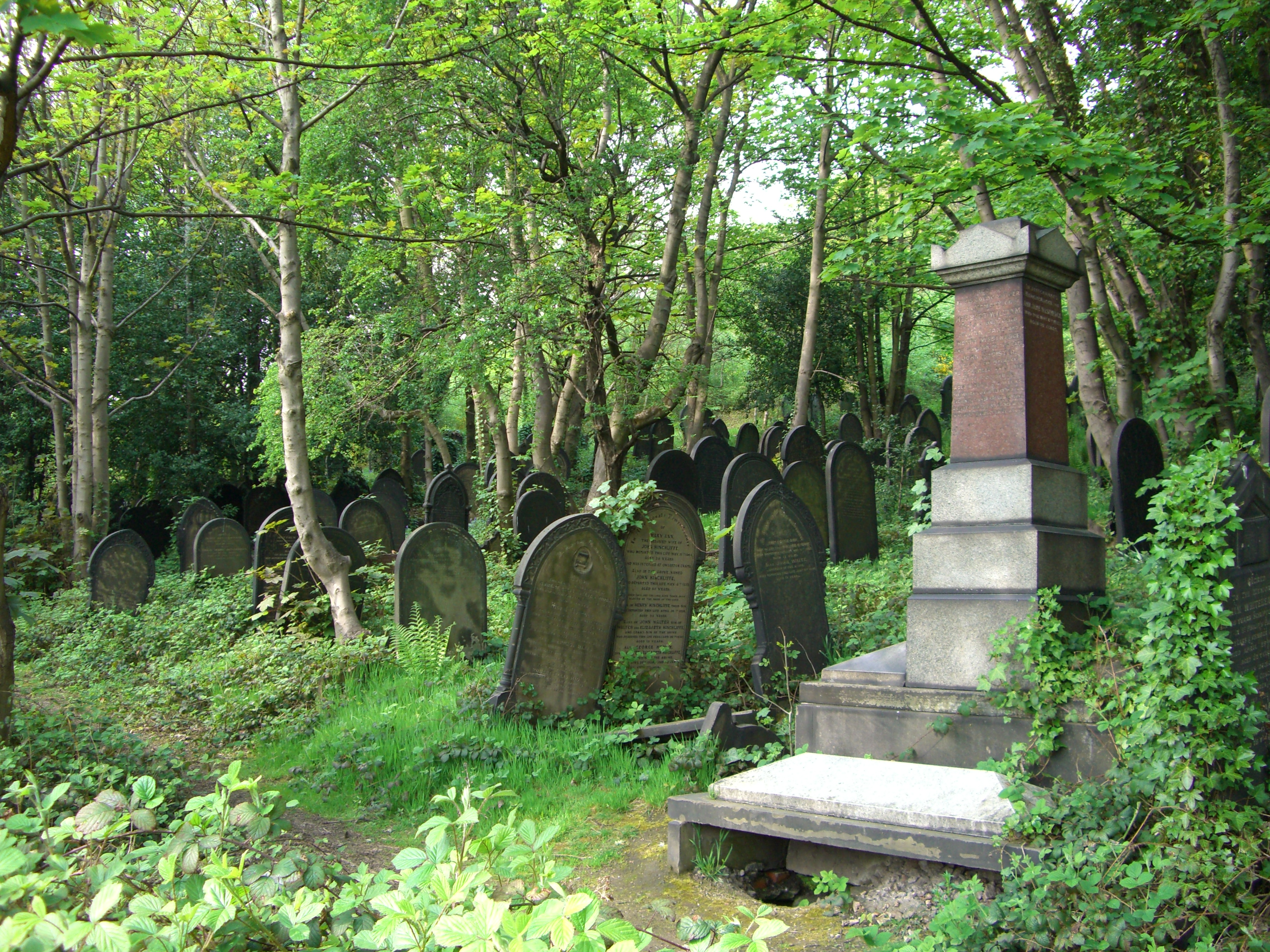
- The cemetery is part of the wider Wardsend Cemetery Local Wildlife Site

Details
- Established: 1859
- Location: Owlerton, Sheffield, South Yorkshire
- Country: United Kingdom
- Coordinates: 53.40887°N 1.49034°W
- Type: Anglican cemetery
- Style: Victorian
- Owned by: Sheffield City Council
- Size: 5.5 acres
- No. of graves: 29,000+
- Website: https://wardsendcemetery.wordpress.com/
- Find a Grave: Wardsend Cemetery

Wardsend Cemetery is a Victorian cemetery in the Owlerton district of Sheffield, England, consecrated by the Archbishop of York in 1859 and closed to legal burial in 1968.

== History ==
The ground on which the cemetery stands was originally purchased in 1857 by John Livesey, vicar of the nearby St Philip's Church, as an overspill burial ground.

The first burial at Wardsend was of a 2-year-old girl named Ann Marie Marsden in 1857. She is, in keeping with tradition, regarded as the "Guardian of the Cemetery".

The graveyard is also noteworthy for being the final resting place of George Lambert VC, a highly decorated Irish soldier, for holding graves of many victims of the Great Sheffield Flood of 1864, and for being the only cemetery in Britain with an active railway line passing through it.

Sheffield Archives offers much material on the history of the cemetery, perhaps most significantly a detailed narrative account of the 1862 riot and subsequent court hearings entitled Extraordinary Doings in a Cemetery in Sheffield by Ivor Haythorne, and a 2013 dissertation project (heavily influenced by the history from below movement spearheaded by E. P. Thompson and George Rudé) called Crisis of Confidence: The Public Response to the 1862 Sheffield Resurrection Scandal by Jordan Lee Smith.

=== 1862 riot ===
On the evening of 3 June 1862 the cemetery was the location of a turbulent riot by angry Sheffield citizens, against accusations that the Reverend John Livesey and his sexton Isaac Howard were neglecting to bury corpses, and instead selling them to the town's medical school for use in anatomical dissection. The rumours were proven false and Livesey and Howard were instead fined by York Assizes for reusing graves in order to save space. However both were later paid compensation for the damage caused to their property during the riot, and Livesey was reinstated as the vicar of St Philip's Church.

Today Livesey Street, now home to the Hillsborough campus of The Sheffield College as well as the back entrance to Owlerton Stadium is named after the Reverend Livesey.

A memorial stone at the nearby Walled Garden in Hillsborough Park alludes to the unrest; it is a stone four feet long by 18 inches wide, designed to lie flat on the ground and cover a grave. The inscription reads:

To the affectionate remembrance of Frank Bacon.
Who departed this life April 2nd 1854, aged three years.
Also Louis Bacon aged four months
Buried in Wardsend Cemetery April 12th 1858.
And was one of the many found in 1862.
Who had been so ruthlessly disinterred.

== Design ==
The cemetery was originally linked at its Hillsborough entrance by Wardsend Bridge, a two-arched stone structure built in the 18th century exclusively to provide access to the burial ground. However, after its destruction by the Sheffield floods of 25 June 2007, it was rebuilt as a 31.2-foot (9.5 m) wide single-span integral bridge, at an estimated cost of £673,000, and re-opened in early 2009.

The cemetery also contains an obelisk dedicated to soldiers who died at Sheffield's Hillsborough Barracks, just down the road from the cemetery.

There are also buried here a number of service personnel who died in the First and Second World Wars but because their graves are now unmaintainable by the Commonwealth War Graves Commission their names are listed on a Screen Wall Memorial in Plot H of nearby City Road Cemetery.

Since its loss of status as a legal burial ground Sheffield City Council have done little to maintain the cemetery and it has fallen into neglect, save for the efforts of a conservation group the Friends of Wardsend Cemetery, who along with offering guided walks of the site, aim to cull the Japanese knotweed that has overgrown the area.
