= Quid (encyclopedia) =

1963–2007 French encyclopaedia

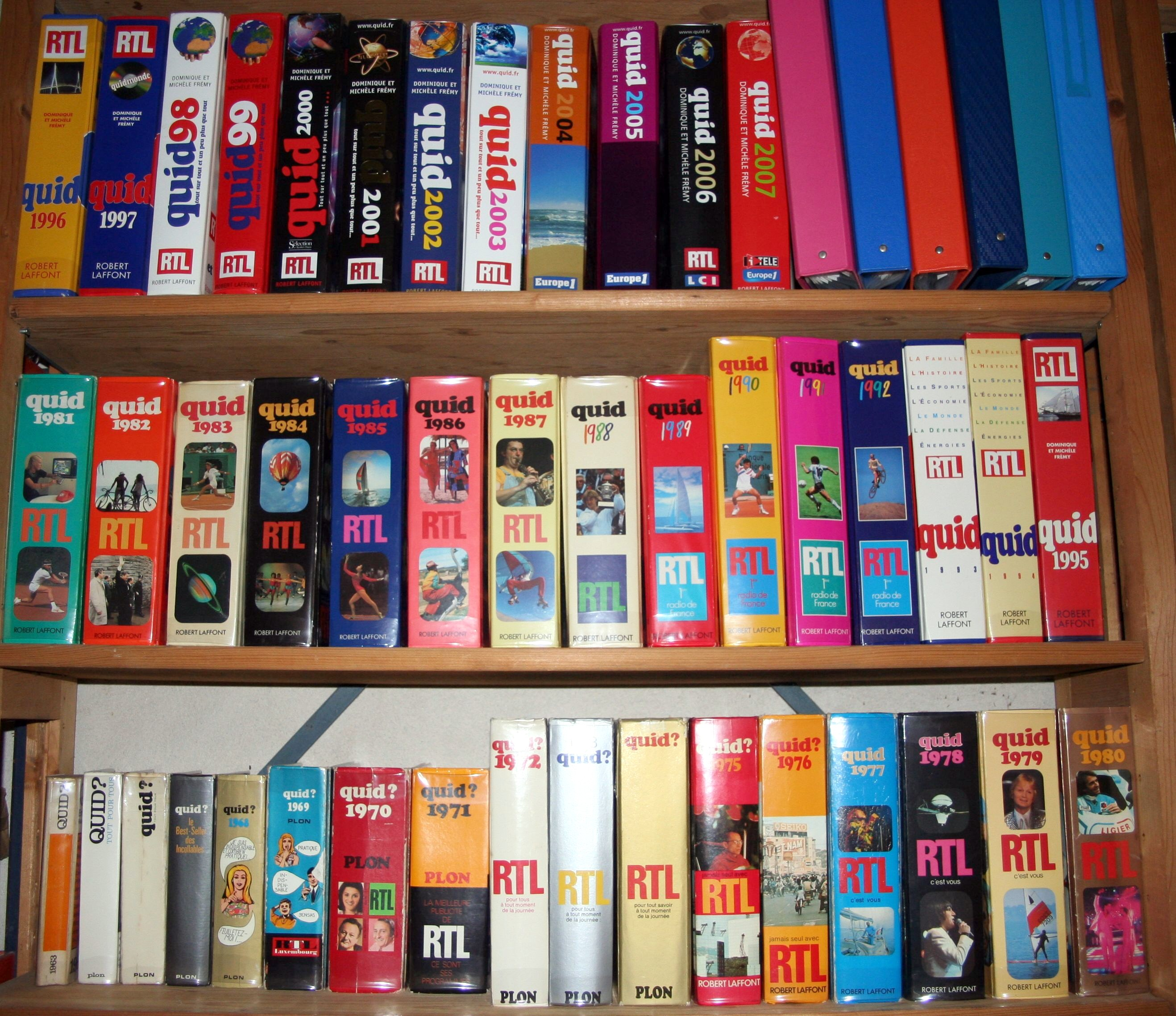
- A collection of Quid editions
- Language: French
- Publisher: Plon, Éditions Robert Laffont
- Publication date: 1963–2007
- Publication place: France

Quid (Note: The word "quid" means "what" in Latin.) is a French encyclopedia, established in 1963 by Dominique Frémy. It was published annually between 1963 and 2007, first by Plon (1963-1974) and later by Éditions Robert Laffont (1975-2007), and was the most popular encyclopedic reference work in France.

The presentation is very compressed, and abbreviations are used extensively in telegraph style. It uses very thin paper to get all the information into one volume. It is published each year in one volume about the size of a large dictionary. The motto of the encyclopedia is "Tout sur tout... tout de suite" (translated as: "Everything on everything... right now"). Examples of the precise information included in Quid are: a) the use of moustaches among Austrian mailmen is forbidden to avoid them being confused with military officers; b) in 1850 there were 1,400,000 inhabitants in Finland, and c) in the West, a woman spends an average of 100 days of her life in ironing.

== History ==
The first edition was published by Plon in the first quarter of 1963 and was sold in 20,000 copies. It was a 632-page illustrations-free paperback. In addition to a brief table of contents, the book included a 10-page index. The author introduced it as a "complete, up-to-date, handy and easy-to-read" book. He announced the book would be published yearly. The next edition was published in the third quarter of 1964: the book was made of a cardboard binding and was a little bit larger (824 pages). The first editions were cosigned by Michèle Frémy, Dominique Frémy's wife. The encyclopedia became larger over the years, reaching the size of a large dictionary. Each edition now needs the contribution of around 12,000 specialists.

The 2007 edition of Quid cost €32; its 2,176 pages contained 2,500,000 items about 650 topics. It sold only about 100,000 copies, compared to more than 400,000 in the 1990s. In February 2008, the 2008 edition was canceled by the publisher, Robert Laffont, which said that print encyclopedias can no longer compete with the free information available on the internet. Frémy, the founder of Quid, said that he would find another publisher and intended to publish a 2009 edition for Christmas 2009.

== Internet edition ==
For some time, Quid was available on the Internet. The original site www.quid.fr disappeared around 2010. In addition to the complete current issue, it offered a daily news website, a world atlas with maps and 6,000 lexical entries on the 36,380 French communes with details about their history, geography, tourist attractions and economic life.

== Special editions ==
Title	Subject
Grand Quid illustré (18 volumes)	Illustrations
Quid de mai 68	May 1968 in France
Quid de Proust	Marcel Proust
Quid de Maupassant	Guy de Maupassant
Quid d'Alexandre Dumas	Alexandre Dumas
Quid de la Tour Eiffel	Eiffel Tower
Quid des Présidents de la République	Presidents of France
Quid: le multimédia (colour supplement with Quid 1996)	Multimedia
Quid Monde: CD-Rom sur les états du monde with Quid 1997	List of sovereign states
