= René Doumic =

French critic and man of letters

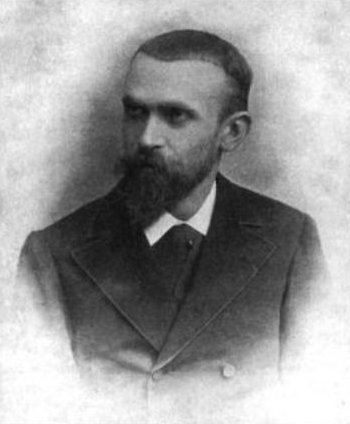
René Doumic

René Doumic (7 March 1860, in Paris – 2 December 1937), French critic and man of letters, was born in Paris, and after a distinguished career at the École Normale began to teach rhetoric at the Collège Stanislas de Paris.

== Life ==
Doumic attended the Lycée Condorcet and the École Normale, both in Paris. He was a contributor to Le Moniteur Universel, the Journal des Débats and the Revue bleue, but was best known as the independent and uncompromising literary critic of the Revue des Deux Mondes.

In 1898, Doumic participated in the French Conferences at Harvard University. He was a Chevalier of the Legion of Honour, president of the Société des gens de lettres (1909), member of the Académie française, and Fellow of the University of Paris. He wrote a number of articles for the Catholic Encyclopedia.

As editor of the Revue des Deux Mondes he published the work of Jewish-Algerian writer Elissa Rhaïs.

== Bibliography ==
- Éléments d'histoire littéraire (1888)
- Portraits d'écrivains (1892)
- De Scribe à Ibsen (1893)
- Écrivains d'aujourd'hui (1894)
- Études sur la littérature française (5 vols., 1896-1905)
- Les Jeunes (1896)
- Essais sur le théâtre contemporain (1897)
- Hommes et idées du XIXe siècle (1903)
- an edition of the Lettres d'Elvire à Lamartine (1905).
