= Cours Hattemer =

Secular private Parisian school

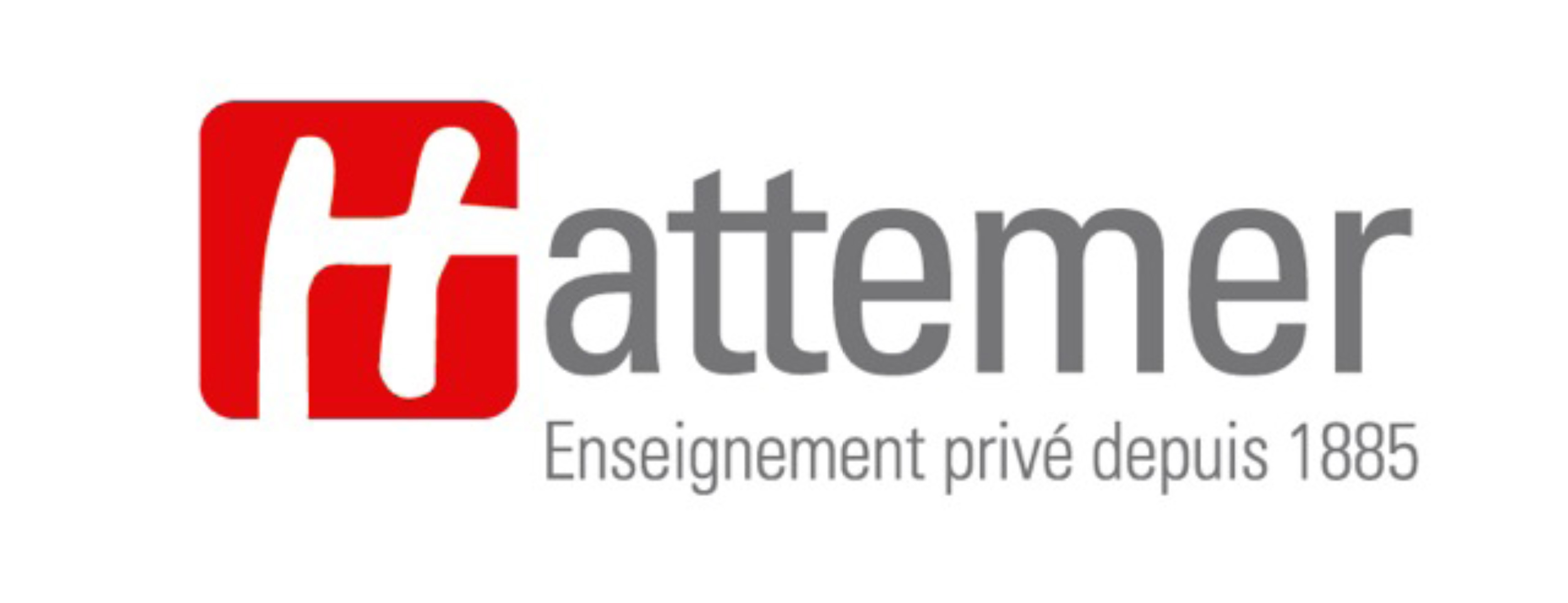

Location
- 52, rue de Londres (Paris 8th) / 43, rue Decamps (Paris 16th); France; 48.878404°N 2.325459°E

Information
- Type: Private, secular
- Established: 1885
- Grades: Kindergarten to Baccalauréat
- Enrollment: 1,500
- Website: www.hattemer.fr

Cours Hattemer is a French private, secular school. It is independent of the state, and has permission to follow its own teaching approach, which is structured and places great stress on repetition to drive home what has been learned. The school has many well-known alumni including the actress Brigitte Bardot and the French President Jacques Chirac.

Hattemer is located in Paris, in the 8th and 16th districts.

== Description ==
Location in Paris

The school was founded by Rose Hattemer of Alsace in 1885. The founder taught some of the great Parisian families towards the end of the 19th century, and developed a method of teaching by correspondence for the children of diplomats, which is still followed today. The school was originally located on rue Clapeyron in the 8th arrondissement of Paris. It is now housed in a five-story building erected nearby on rue de Londres in 1935 to accommodate a growing number of pupils. There is a cafeteria, gym and playground.

The school provides flexible hours, so a student may take time to practice an instrument or train for a sport. When Brigitte Bardot was admitted to the Cours Hattemer at the age of seven during World War II (1939–45) she only had to go to school three days a week, and otherwise studied at home. This gave her time to take dancing lessons. In the period after World War II the school was one of the few that encouraged art, and thereby attracted pupils from the families of actors or public figures. It catered to children who were "special cases" such as Françoise Sagan and her classmate Florence Malraux, daughter of André Malraux, who attended in the early 1950s.

There are about 1,500 students from kindergarten to the Baccalauréat (high school certificate), half of whom learn by correspondence. Classes have 15–25 students.

== Syllabus ==
Hattemer is a private school that is not under contract to the government and so has freedom to set its own curriculum and teaching methods. Students and their parents are screened to ensure they agree that a child who is learning is a happy child. The school's teachers write the textbooks. The school uses structure and repetition in its classes. Constant repetition of content in oral and written questions includes reviews of what was learned in a day, a week and a year.

In 2017, Hattemer joined the international NACE Schools group.

== Notable alumni ==
The walls of the school are lined with photographs of famous alumni, including Brigitte Bardot, Jacques Chirac, Christophe Dechavanne, Jean d'Ormesson, Michel Polnareff, Véronique Sanson and Anne Sinclair. Other notable alumni include:

- Aga Khan IV (1936-2025), businessman, Imam of Nizari Ismailism
- Bảo Đại (1913–97), last emperor of Vietnam
- Alain Calmat (born 1940), skater, surgeon, politician
- Claude Cheysson (1920–2012), politician
- Bruno Cremer (1929–2010), actor
- Bernard Debré (born 1944), urologist, politician
- Patrick Dewaere (1947–82), film actor
- Dominique Frémy (1931–2008), creator of the Quid encyclopedia
- Jacques Friedel (1921–2014), physicist, material scientist
- Jacques de Lacretelle (1888–1985), novelist
- Jacques Laffite (born 1943), racing driver, TV commentator
- Bertrand Meyer (born 1950), computer scientist
- Christine Ockrent (born 1944), journalist
- Michel Poniatowski (1922–2002), politician
- Anne Queffélec (born 1948), classical pianist
- Rainier III, Prince of Monaco (1923–2005), ruler of Monaco
- Édouard de Rothschild (born 1957), businessman
- Françoise Sagan (1935–2004), playwright, novelist
- Jean-Paul Sartre (1905–80), philosopher, playwright, novelist
- Princess Stéphanie of Monaco (born 1965), singer, fashion model.

== Sources ==
- Berest, Anne (2015-06-15). Sagan, Paris 1954. Gallic Books, Limited. ISBN 978-1-910477-15-1.
- Beyer, Caroline (2013-09-20). "Hattemer, l'école où le CE1 s'appelle "10e" et où la répétition est plébiscitée". Le Figaro (in French).
- Cittone, Laurent (2013-12-05). Étienne Péclard, une carrière en mouvement. BoD - Books on Demand. ISBN 978-2-322-03488-8.
- "Historical Background". Hattemer. Archived from the original on 2015-07-01.
- Montclos, Violaine de (2012-10-04). "Hattemer, les secrets d'un miracle scolaire". Le Point (in French).
- "Quelques Anciens Celebres" (in French). Hattemar. Archived from the original on 2015-06-18.
- Singer, Barnett (2006-07-06). Brigitte Bardot: A Biography. McFarland. ISBN 978-0-7864-8426-3.
- Tarlé, Sophie de (2013-04-15). "Nouvel élan pour le cours Hattemer". L'Etudiant (in French).
