= Thomas Worsley Staniforth =

British hymn writer

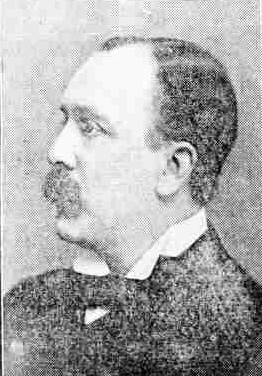
- Born: 7 June 1845; Sheffield, England
- Died: 25 March 1909 (aged 63); Sheffield, England

Thomas Worsley Staniforth (7 June 1845 – 25 March 1909) was a British hymn writer.

== Life ==
Thomas was born in Sheffield, England, to Thomas Staniforth, a Grinder and Cordelia Worsley. His family lived in the Wicker area of the city. Prior to becoming interested in music, Thomas worked as an accounting clerk. By the time of the 1871 Census he had relocated to Brighton and is described as an organist. Thomas primarily worked at St Paul's Church, Brighton as organist and choirmaster and later moved on to a position as music master at Highgate School in London.

On 27 February 1872 his hymn O Thou Our Souls was chosen to be performed at St. Paul's Cathedral during a thanksgiving service for the recovery of the then Prince of Wales Edward VII. Other notable hymns composed by Staniforth include Jerusalem my happy home - composed to celebrate the laying of the foundation stone of St Peter's, London Docks - and St Paul. He was also a regular contributor to the Sheffield Telegraph for whom he wrote articles on church history and music.

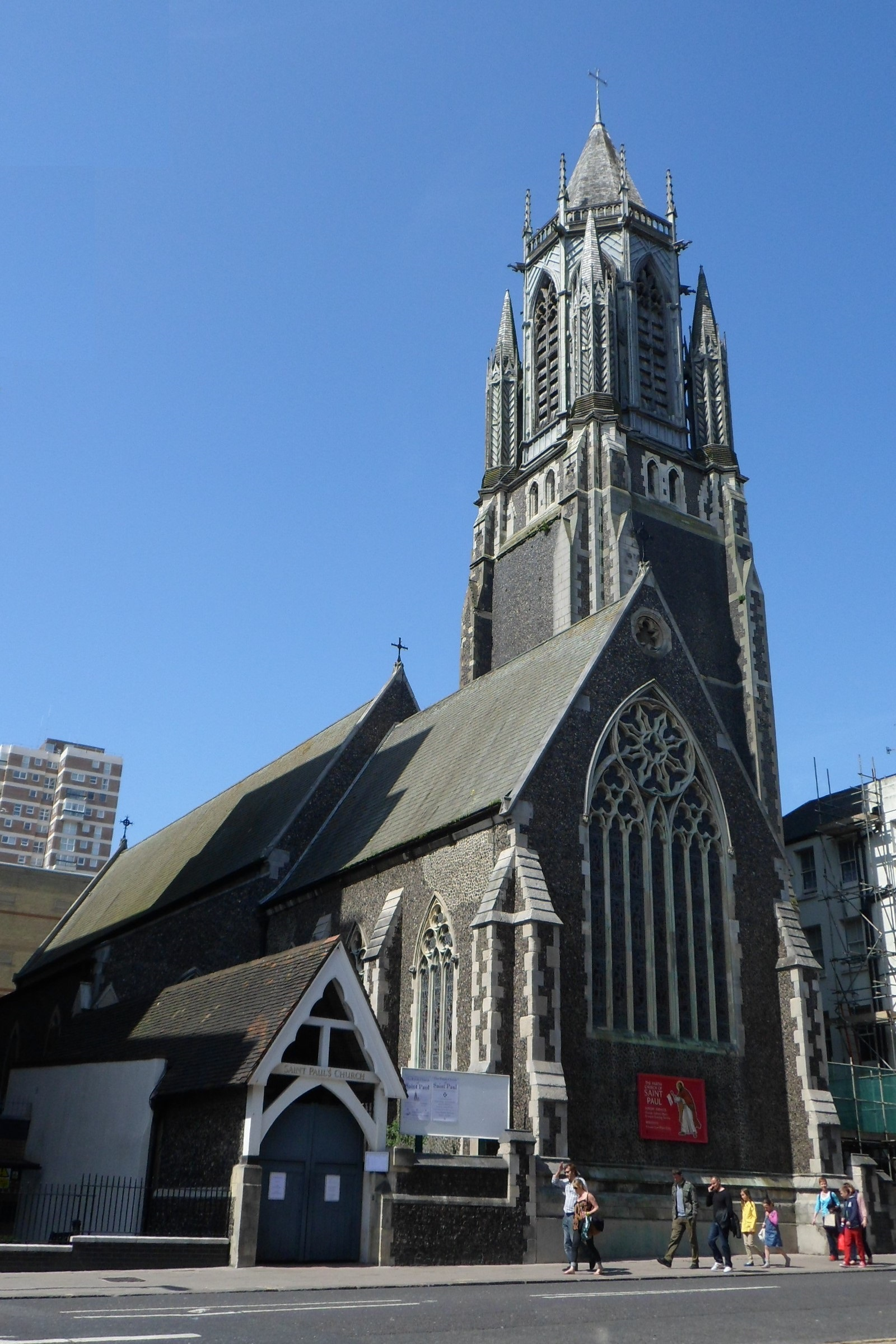
St Paul's Church, Brighton

Towards the end of the century he retired back to Sheffield. On 5 October 1898 he married Sarah Susannah Nicholson (Denton), a widower, at the Wicker Parish church. He died on 25 March 1909 and was buried on 29 March 1909 at City Road Cemetery. His Musical Times obituary noted that Staniforth was "a brilliant and articulate performer on the organ and pianoforte...took a great interest in the musical history of Sheffield [and] was an excellent raconteur".

Staniforth's younger sister was Cordelia Staniforth, who married Herbert Antcliffe of Eckington, Derbyshire. Their son, also Herbert Antcliffe, was a musicologist who edited Staniforth's Rondino Grazioso for piano, published by J H Larway in 1910.
