= Théâtre Montparnasse =

Theatre in Paris, France

- Théâtre Montparnasse-Gaston Baty
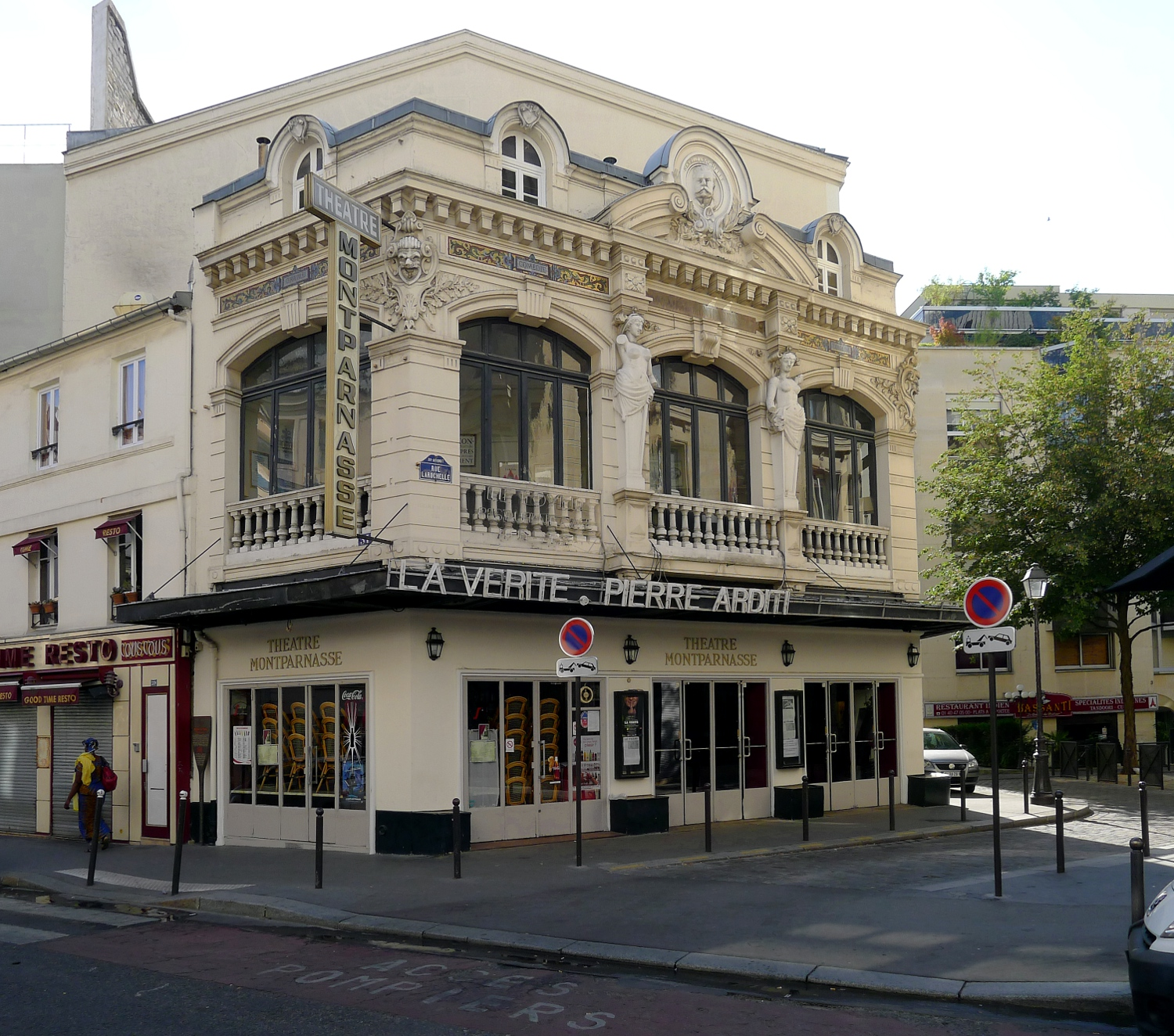
- Interactive map of Théâtre Montparnasse
- Address: 31, rue de la Gaîté, 14th. Paris; Paris
- Coordinates: 48.8409275°N 2.324502°E
- Capacity: main theatre: 715; Petit Montparnasse: 200

Construction
- Opened: 1886
- Architect: Charles Peigniet

Website
- www.theatremontparnasse.com/

The Théâtre Montparnasse (French pronunciation: [teɑtʁ mɔ̃paʁnas]) is a theatre at 31, rue de la Gaîté in the 14th arrondissement of Paris.

== History ==
After the death of famed Paris theatre builder and artistic director Henri Larochelle (1826-1884), his widow, along with former actor and artistic director Louis-Hubert Hartmann, built the present structure, which opened on 29 October 1886, on a site that had been dedicated to theatre since 1817. Architect Charles Peigniet, who helped create the pedestal for the Statue of Liberty in New York Bay, designed the new building.

Although the Théâtre Montparnasse began as a commercial playhouse for melodramatic fare, it occasionally leased its stage to new experimentalist plays of the Independent Theatre movement. A year after the theatre's opening, Hartmann readily agreed to lease his stage to André Antoine, whose revolutionary new company, the Théâtre Libre, had, in spring 1887, earned immediate publicity as an exciting venture devoted to producing new plays. He also generously offered his warehouse of scenery and backdrops. Théâtre Montparnasse became the Théâtre Libre's home for the six programmed evenings between November 1887 and June 1888, where it presented fifteen new works of varying quality. The season's most resounding success was the French premiere of Tolstoy's The Power of Darkness on 10 February 1888, which led to a rare sold-out repeat performance eight days later. By contrast, on 16 January 1891, Paul Fort's Théâtre d'Art presented a failed, five-and-a-half-hour production of Shelley's The Cenci in French translation.

From 1930 to 1943, Gaston Baty directed the theatre, and as a result, it became known as the Théâtre Montparnasse-Gaston Baty. From 1944 to 1964, actress Margaret Jamois directed the theatre.

In 1965, Lars Schmidt bought the theatre and appointed Jerome Hullot artistic director. Schmidt and Hullot introduced many English talents to the French stage, including such authors and actors as Harold Pinter, Peter Shaffer, Noël Coward, Arnold Wesker, and Murray Schisgal. In 1979, they created the Petit Montparnasse theatre on the site of a former warehouse.

In 1984, Schmidt retired, and Myriam Colombi succeeded him, renovating the theatre and adding a bar-restaurant. The current capacity of the main theatre is seven hundred and fifteen seats.

In 1998, renovation and expansion of the Petit Montparnasse began, and it became a hall with two hundred seats, finally reopening in November 2003.

The Théâtre Montparnasse-Gaston Baty was designated a historic monument on 3 April 1984.

== Productions since 1930 ==
=== Productions by Gaston Baty ===
- 1930: The Threepenny Opera by Bertolt Brecht
- 1930: The Doctor in Spite of Himself by Molière
- 1930: Le Sourd ou l'auberge pleine by Pierre-Jean-Baptiste Choudard-Desforges
- 1931: Wasteland by Jean-Victor Pellerin
- 1931: Danube red by Bernard Zimmer
- 1932: Bifur by Simon Gantillon
- 1932: Café-Tabac by Denys Amiel
- 1932: As You Desire Me by Luigi Pirandello
- 1933: Crime and Punishment by Dostoevsky
- 1934: Round trip from Jacques Chabannes
- 1934: Prosper by Lucienne Favre
- 1935: Hotel masks by John Albert
- 1935: Les Caprices de Marianne by Alfred de Musset
- 1936: Madame Bovary by Gustave Flaubert
- 1937: The Failures by Henri-René Lenormand
- 1937: Faust by Goethe
- 1937: Madame Capet by Marcelle Maurette
- 1938: Arden of Feversham by Henri-René Lenormand
- 1938: Dulcinea Gaston Baty
- 1939: Manon Lescaut of Marcelle Maurette by the Abbe Prevost
- 1940: Phèdre by Jean Racine
- 1940: A boy at Very by Eugene Labiche
- 1941: Mary Stuart by Marcelle Maurette
- 1941: The Taming of the Shrew by William Shakespeare
- 1942: Macbeth by William Shakespeare
- 1944: The Grand Poucet by Claude-André Puget
- 1944: Emily Brontë, pièce en 3 actes et 9 tableaux by Simone
- 1945: Lorenzaccio by Alfred de Musset
- 1947: The Love for Three Oranges by Alexandre Arnoux

=== Productions by Marguerite Jamois ===
- 1943: Hedda Gabler by Henrik Ibsen
- 1946: Mourning Becomes Electra by Eugene O'Neill
- 1949: Snow by Marcelle Maurette and Georgette Paul
- 1951: Dangerous Liaisons by Pierre Choderlos de Laclos
- 1955: The Teahouse of the August Moon by John Patrick
- 1956: The Diary of Anne Frank by Frances Goodrich and Albert Hackett
