= Louis Bertrand (novelist) =

French novelist, historian and essayist

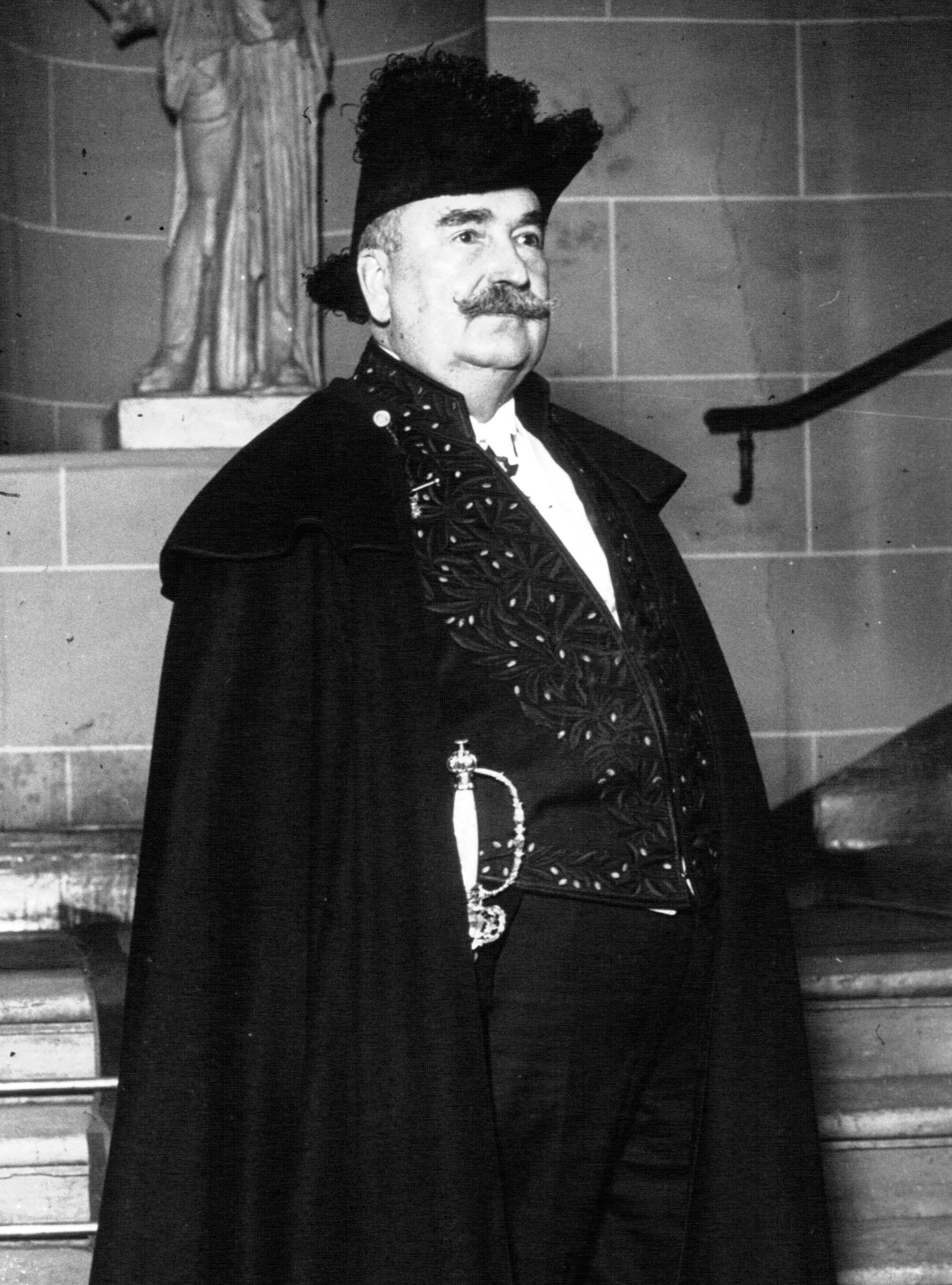
Louis Bertrand

Louis Bertrand (French pronunciation: [lwi bɛʁtʁɑ̃]; 20 March 1866 in Spincourt, Meuse – 6 December 1941 in Cap d'Antibes) was a French novelist, historian and essayist. He was the third member elected to occupy seat 4 of the Académie française in 1925.

== Biography ==
Bertrand was born in France and later moved to Algiers. His first novel Le sang des races (1899) explored this complex identity. It's considered a precursor of Algérianisme, a concept of Algerian literature exploring the discrete Algerian identity of settlers laying claim to an authentic existence in Algeria independent of France itself. Bertrand's work notably "valorizes the colony and its European inhabitants", as Seth Graebner put it "not the palm trees, camels or other exotic backdrops (and certainly not Arabs) but instead the new farms, cities, roads, ports and the Europeans building them." Some have described it as "echoes of a fascist discourse".

Bertrand encouraged the Jewish-Algerian writer Elissa Rhaïs to first publish her work.

== Work ==
Novels

- Le Sang des races, éd. Ollendorff, 1899.
- La Cina, éd. Ollendorff, 1901.
- Le Rival de Don Juan, éd. Ollendorff, 1903.
- Pépète le bien-aimé, éd. Ollendorff, 1904 (reprinted by the same publisher in 1920 under the title Pépète et Balthazar).
- L’Invasion, Bibliothèque Charpentier, 1907.
- Les Bains de Phalère, éd. Fayard, 1910.
- Mademoiselle de Jessincourt, éd. Fayard, 1911
- La concession de Madame Pedtitgand, éd. Fayard, 1912.
- Sanguis martyrum, éd. Fayard, 1918
- L’Infante, éd. Fayard, 1920.
- Cardenio - L'homme aux rubans couleur de feu, éd. Ollendorff, 1922.
- Une destinée (1), Jean Perbal, éd. Fayard, 1925.
- Une destinée (2), Une nouvelle éducation sentimentale, éd. Fayard, 1928.
- Le Roman de la Conquête, 1930.
- Une destinée (3), Hippolyte porte-couronnes, éd. Fayard, 1932.
- Une destinée (4), Sur les routes du Sud, éd. Fayard, 1932.
- Une destinée (5), Mes années d'apprentissage, éd. Fayard, 1939.
- Une destinée (6), Jérusalem, éd. Fayard, 1939.

Essays, historical, biographical and critical works

- La fin du classicisme et le retour à l’antique dans la seconde moitié du XVIII^{e} siècle et les premières années du XIX^{e} en France, Hachette 1897.
- Le jardin de la mort, éd. Ollendorff, 1905.
- La Grèce du soleil et des paysages, Bibliothèque Charpentier, 1908.
- Le Mirage oriental, Librairie académique Perrin, 1910.
- Le Livre de la Méditerranée, éd. Grasset, 1911 (édition définitive en 1923).
- Gustave Flaubert (avec des fragments inédits), Mercure de France, 1912.
- Saint Augustin, éd. Fayard, 1913
- Les plus belles pages de saint Augustin, éd. Fayard, 1916.
- Le sens de l'ennemi, éd. Fayard, 1917.
- Flaubert à Paris ou le mort vivant, éd. Grasset, 1921.
- Sur le Nil, Les Amis d'Edouard, 1921.
- Les villes d'or - Algérie et Tunisie romaines, éd.Fayard, 1921.
- Autour de saint Augustin, éd. Fayard, 1921.
- Louis XIV, éd. Fayard, 1923.
- La vie amoureuse de Louis XIV, éd. Flammarion, 1924.
- Les journées du grand roi, éd. Flammarion, 1925.
- Devant l’Islam, éd. Plon, 1926.
- Ma Lorraine, souvenirs et portraits, A. Delpeuch, 1926.
- Sainte Thérèse, éd. Fayard, 1927
- Idées et portraits, éd. Plon, 1927.
- Les grands aspects du paysage français, A. Delpeuch, 1928.
- Philippe II à l'Escorial, L'Artisan du Livre, 1929.
- La Méditerranée [avec Hubert Robert], Alpina, 1929.
- Philippe II, une ténébreuse affaire, éd. Grasset, 1929.
- Histoire de Napoléon, [illustrations by Albert Uriet], éd. Mame, 1929.
- Au bruit des fontaines d’Aix-en-Provence, Emile Hazan, 1929.
- Nuits d’Alger [lithographies de Suréda], Flammarion, 1929.
- D’Alger la romantique à Fez la mystérieuse, éd. des Portiques, 1930.
- Font-Romeu, éd. Flammarion, 1931.
- Histoire d’Espagne, éd. Fayard, 1932.
- Le livre de consolation, éd. Fayard, 1933.
- La Riviera que j’ai connue, éd. Fayard, 1933.
- Vers Cyrène, terre d’Apollon, éd. Fayard, 1935.
- Celle qui fut aimée d’Augustin, éd. Albin Michel, 1935.
- Hitler, éd. Fayard, 1936.
- L’Espagne, éd. Flammarion, 1937.
- La Lorraine, éd. J. de Gigord, 1937.
- Alger, éd. Fernand Sorlot, 1938.
- Lamartine, éd. Fayard, 1940.
- Jardins d’Espagne, éd. Aubanel, 1940.
- Un grand Africain : le maréchal de Saint-Arnaud, éd. Fayard, 1941.

== Studies of Louis Bertrand ==
- Jacques Alexandropoulos, "De Louis Bertrand à Pierre Hubac: images de l'Afrique antique", in J. Alexandropoulos, P. Cabanel, La Tunisie mosaïque: Diasporas, cosmopolitisme, archéologies de l'identité, Toulouse, Presses Universitaires du Mirail de l'Université de Toulouse, 2000, p. 457-478.
- David Clark Cabeen, The African novels of Louis Bertrand. A phase of the renascence of national energy in France, Philadelphia, Westbrook Publishing Co., 1922.

== See also ==
- André Servier
