= Herbert Antcliffe =

British musicologist, music critic and author (1875–1940)

Herbert Antcliffe (30 July 1875 – 11 September 1964) was a British musicologist, music critic, teacher and author on musical subjects, who established his career in Sheffield and later moved to The Hague in Holland.

== Education ==
Antcliffe was born in Sheffield, son of Herbert Antcliffe of Eckington, Derbyshire and his wife Cordelia Staniforth (younger sister of the hymn composer Thomas Worsley Staniforth, whose music Antcliffe later edited). Antcliffe attended Sheffield University in its formative years where he first encountered the conductor and composer Henry Coward, who remained a friend.

== Organist, teacher and critic ==
From 1895 he established himself as a music critic for the Sheffield Telegraph. He was also organist at St Matthew's Church, Carver Street, Sheffield Treeton Parish Church and St Wilfrid's Church, Sheffield. As a music tutor in Sheffield he taught piano, organ, singing and music theory from his home at 136 Crookesmoor Road, and later at 102 Cell Street.

Antcliffe left Sheffield in 1915, joining the staff of the Evening Standard in London. He took up an organists position at St Alban's Church, North Finchley. After World War 1 he moved to The Hague, where he lived at 73, van Merlenstraat, to further his long-standing expertise in Dutch music. He was awarded the Queen Wilhelmina Honour for services to Dutch music in 1939.

== Author and composer ==
Antcliffe was a regular contributor to British, European, American and South African musical journals from the early 1900s until the 1950s. As well as short studies of Brahms and Schubert (in the Bell's Miniature Series of Musicians) Antcliffe wrote Living Music (1912), sub-titled "a popular introduction to the methods of modern music", and in 1927 self-published Art, Religion and Clothes, a compilation of his articles on music and related subjects. The Chorusmaster (1928) is a practical guide for organising and conducting choirs and choral societies, one of several of his books aimed at amateurs.

He was also an occasional composer of songs, part songs and church music. His choral setting of Wordsworth's A song for the spinning wheel was published in 1914 by Bayley & Ferguson.

== Later life ==
Caught in Holland by the Nazi invasion, Antcliffe was unable to continue his journalistic activities, and with his Dutch wife Helena Borsboom suffered from near-starvation. They returned to Britain in January 1949 to live at 111 London Road, St Leonards-on-Sea. In recognition of his services to British music he was awarded a Civil List Pension.

Helena Antcliff died in October 1961. Herbert Antcliffe died three years later, aged 89. A collection of his archives and manuscripts are held at Sheffield University.

== Publications ==
- Brahms (G. Bell & Sons, 1905)
- Schubert (G. Bell & Sons, 1910)
- Living Music (1912)
- The Successful Music Teacher (1912)
- A Study of Modern Harmony, by René Lenormand, translated Antcliffe (1915)
- The Amateur Singer (1920)
- How to Enjoy Music (1921)
- Musiek in Europa na Wagner (1925)
- 'The Renascence of Dutch Music', 14 page article from The Proceedings of The Musical Association (1925)
- Art, Religion and Clothes (self-published, 1926)
- The Chorusmaster (Paxton, 1928, with an introduction by Henry Coward)
- Short Studies in the Nature of Music (1929)
- Beethoven's own words, compiled and annotated by Philip Kruseman, translated Antcliffe (Hinrichsen's miniature surveys, 1947)
