= Plon (publisher) =

French publishing company, founded in 1852

- Parent company: Editis
- Status: Active
- Founded: 1852
- Founder: Henri Plon and his 2 brothers
- Country of origin: France
- Headquarters location: Paris, France
- Publication types: Books
- Official website: www.lisez.com/plon/21

Plon is a French book publishing company, founded in 1852 by Henri Plon and his two brothers.

== History ==
The Éditions Plon were created in 1852, by Henri Plon and his two brothers. They were given the title of Imprimeur de l’Empereur (Imperial publisher) and published the correspondence of Louis XIII, Marie Antoinette, and Napoleon.

During the 1920s the house published the novels of the Jewish-Algerian writer Elissa Rhaïs.

Plon published Quid, an encyclopedia, from 1963 to 1974.

They were acquired by the Groupe de La Cité, which was later acquired in 1988 by Havas.

In 2001, Havas was itself absorbed by Vivendi, then called Vivendi Universal. The Vivendi group, facing financial troubles, sold several publishing companies, including Plon, to Wendel Investissement, which put it under the umbrella of the Editis group. In 2008, Editis was sold to the Spanish group Planeta.

In July 2010 the Editis Group bought Plon and the company is dissolved.

Since 2018, Sophie Charnavel directs the Plon editions.

At the end of 2018, Vivendi bought Editis for 900 million euros.

In November 2023, Czech Media Invest, which is owned by Czech billionaire Daniel Křetínský, acquired Editis from Vivendi.

== Book series ==
- L'Abeille PLON
- Bibliothèque PLON
- Bibliothèque reliée PLON
- Dictionnaire Amoureux
- Documents et Mémoires
- Feux Croisés
- La Nouvelle Bibliothèque PLON
- Romans
- Terre Humaine
- Tribune Libre
