= City Road Cemetery =

Cemetery in Sheffield, England

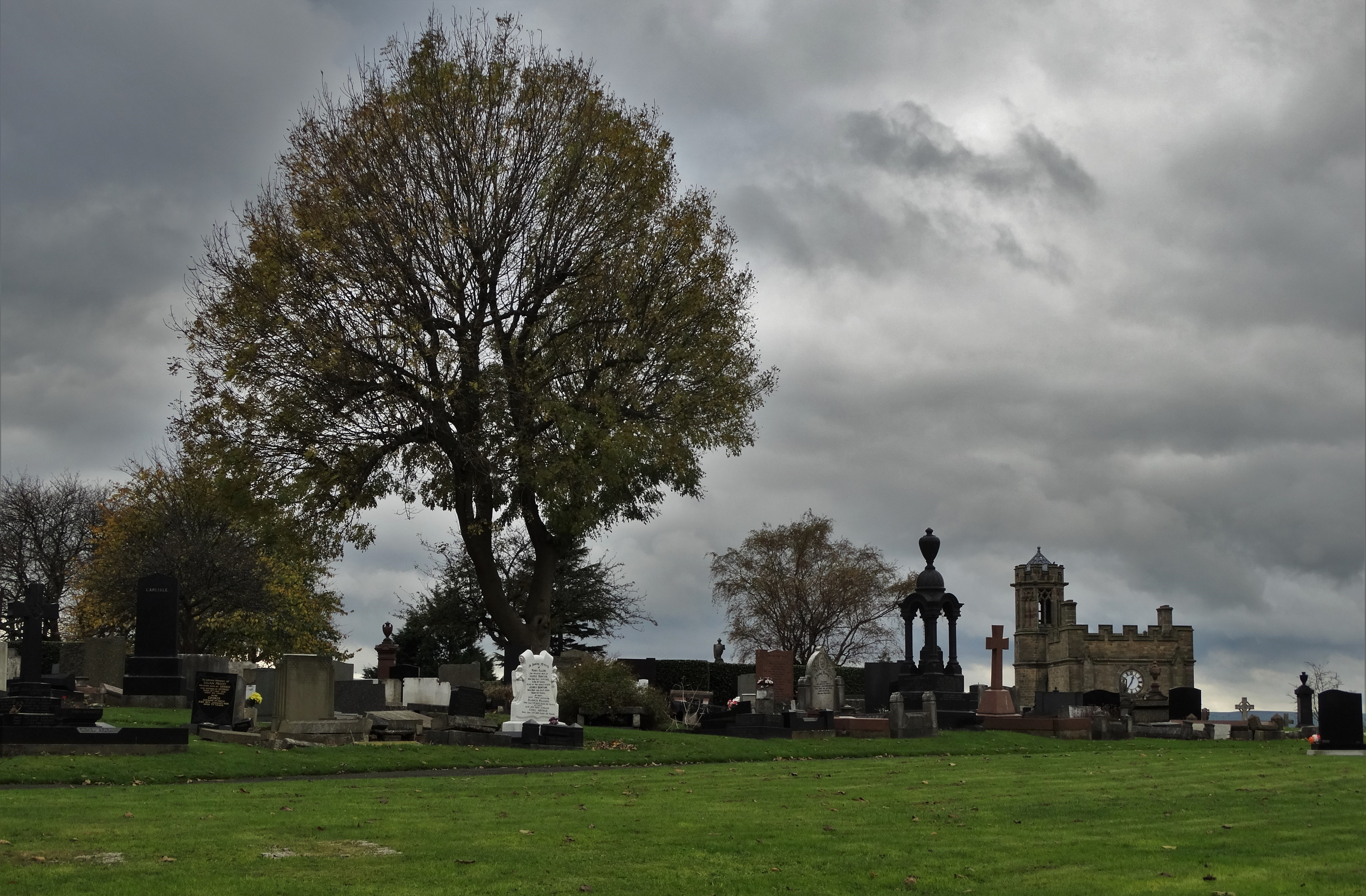
- Cemetery and Catholic mortuary chapel

- Location within Sheffield
- 53°22′11″N 1°26′24″W
- Location: Sheffield, South Yorkshire

History
- Founded: 1881
- Built for: Sheffield Township Burial Board

Site notes
- Architect(s): Messrs M E Hadfield and Son

National Register of Historic Parks and Gardens
- Official name: City Road Cemetery
- Designated: 13 November 2002
- Reference no.: 1001655

The City Road Cemetery is a cemetery in the City of Sheffield, England, which opened in May 1881 and was originally called Intake Road Cemetery. Covering 100 acres (40 ha), it is the largest of the municipal cemeteries in Sheffield and contains the head office for Bereavement Services in Sheffield. The cemetery contains Sheffield Crematorium, whose first cremation was on 24 April 1905.

In 2002 it was designated by Historic England as a Grade II registered park or garden.

== Location ==
The cemetery is located to the east of central Sheffield. It is in the district called Manor, on a gentle hillside. The cemetery is mainly bordered by housing, on the north, east and south faces, and by City Road on the west. On City Road is the main entrance which features Grade II listed gatehouse which houses the reception and halls of remembrance.

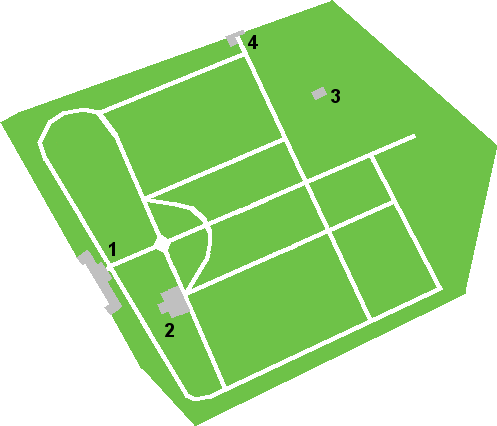

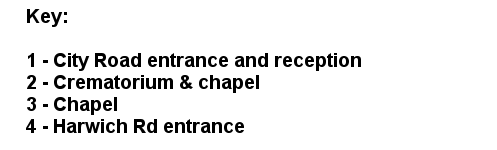

== War graves ==
There are 220 burials or commemorations of Commonwealth servicemen at the cemetery who died in the First World War. A Screen Wall memorial in Section Q, near the main entrance, lists those buried in graves that could not be individually marked by headstones.

There are 147 burials or commemorations of servicemen and women who died in the Second World War, many in a war graves plot in Section H. The plot has a Screen Wall memorial listing servicemen buried in the defunct St Phillip Ward End Church Cemetery whose graves could no longer be maintained by the Commonwealth War Graves Commission. The Commission also erected a memorial, on the west side of the plot, listing 30 servicemen who were cremated at Sheffield Crematorium during the same war and it cares for 9 war graves of foreign nationalities, of which the Belgians have a focal War Memorial in the cemetery.

Also buried in the cemetery are civilian victims of air raids, the largest group (134 who died in the Sheffield Blitz of December 1940) being buried in a communal grave with memorial.

== Notable buildings and structures ==
- The Gatehouse, Grade II listed
- The Crematorium and chapel, Grade II listed
- The Catholic Chapel, Grade II listed
- The Harwich Road gate and gatehouse, Grade II listed
- Belgian War Memorial, Grade II listed
- The Blitz grave, Grade II listed
- War Memorial by Sir R Blomfield, Grade II listed
Listed buildings in City Road Cemetery
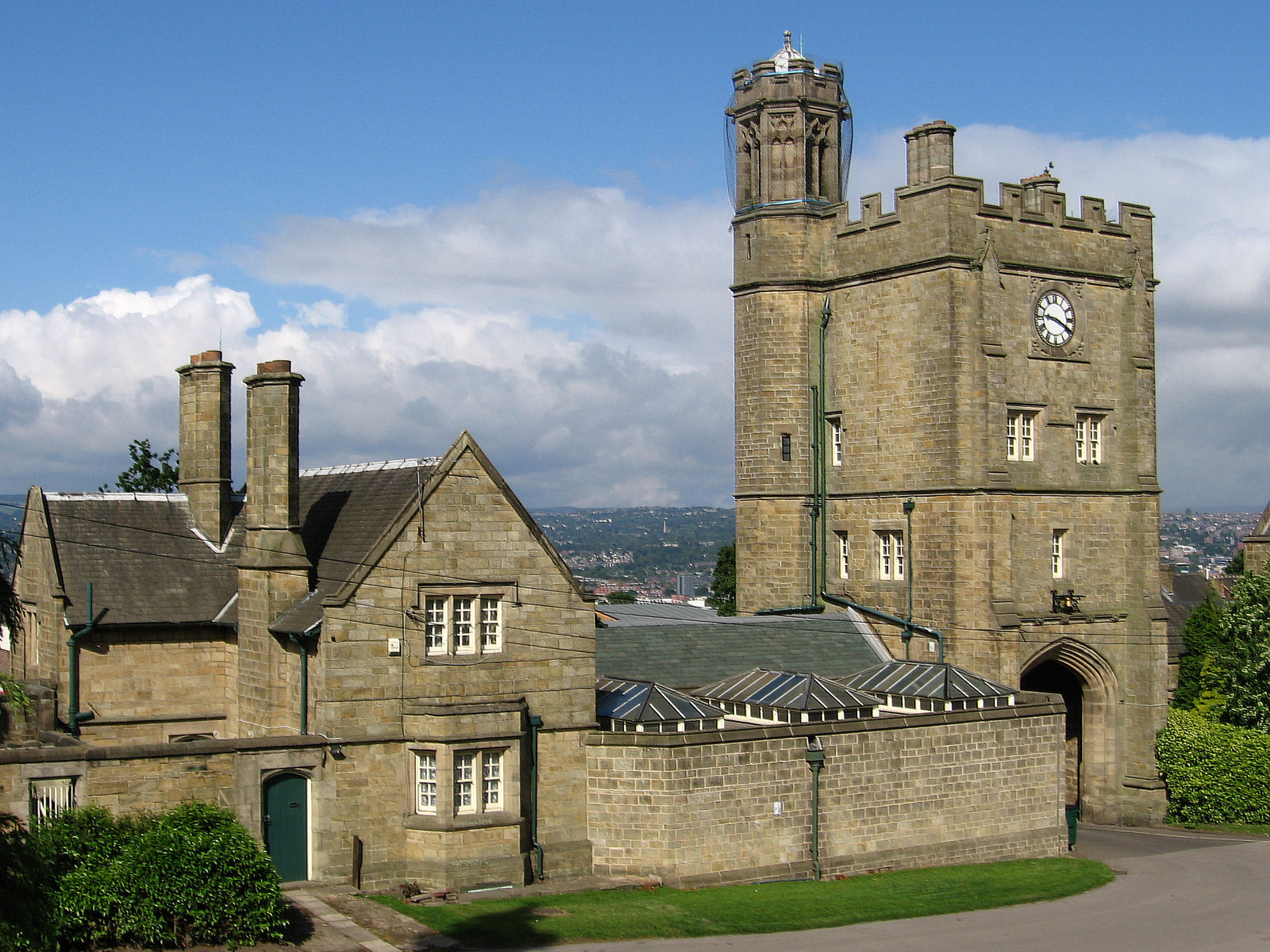
City Road Gatehouse

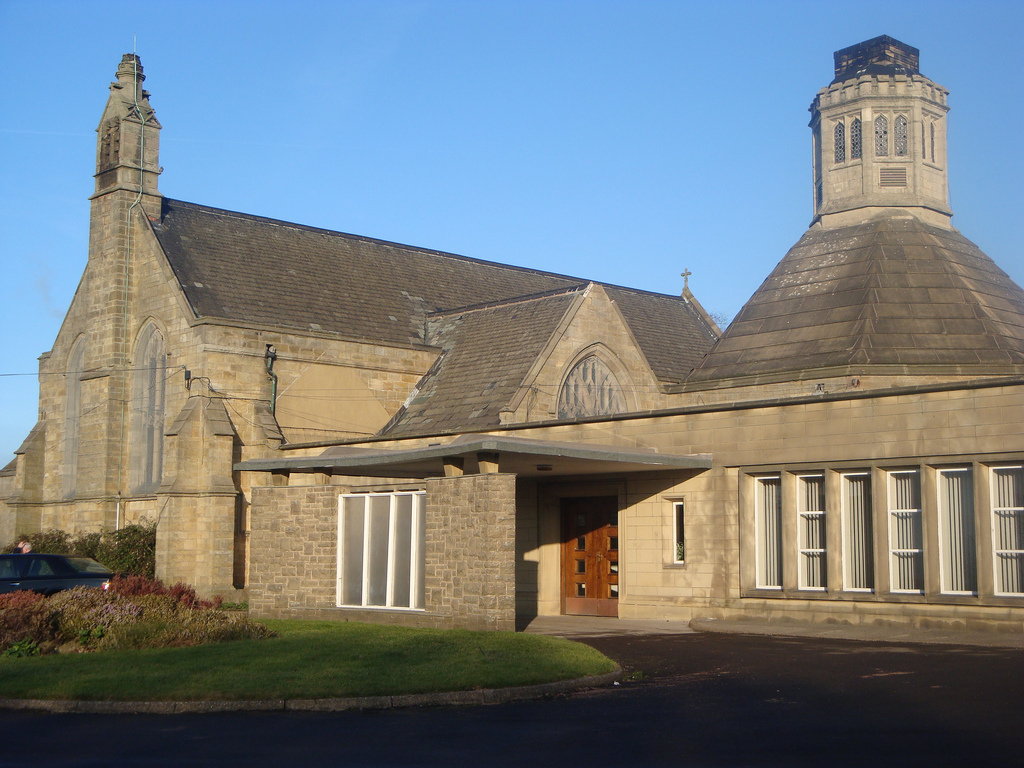
Crematorium and chapel

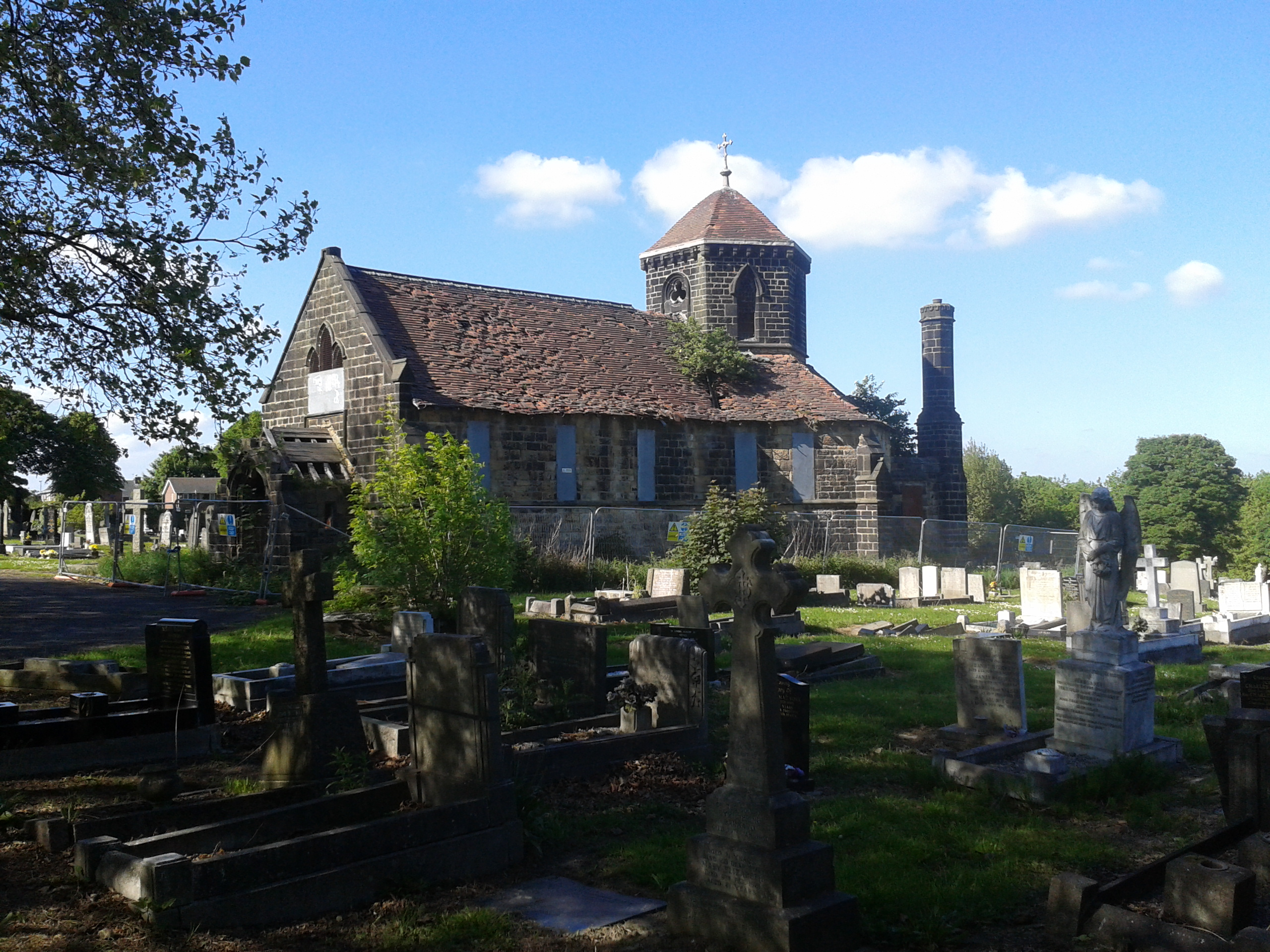
Catholic chapel

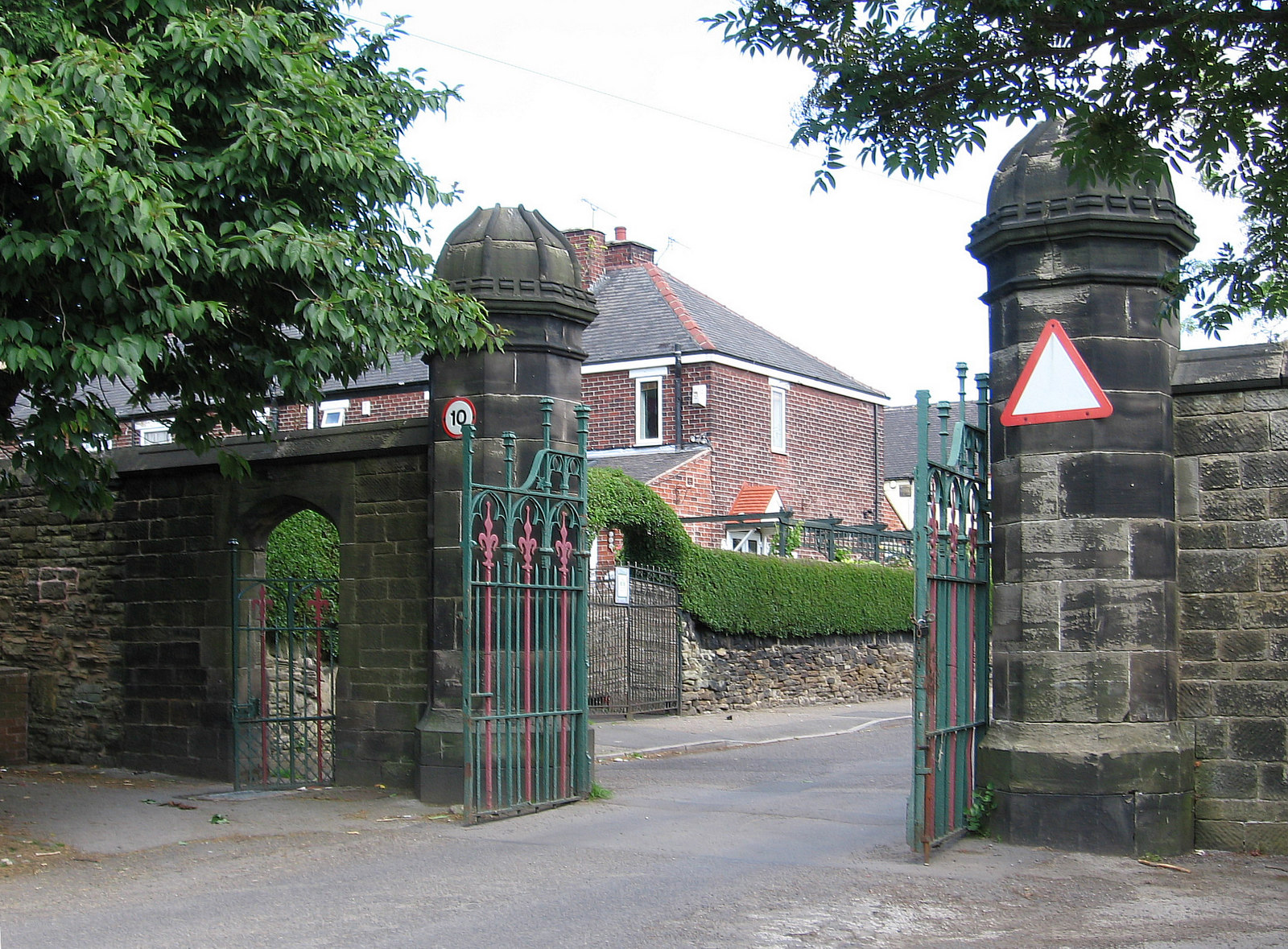
Harwich Road gates

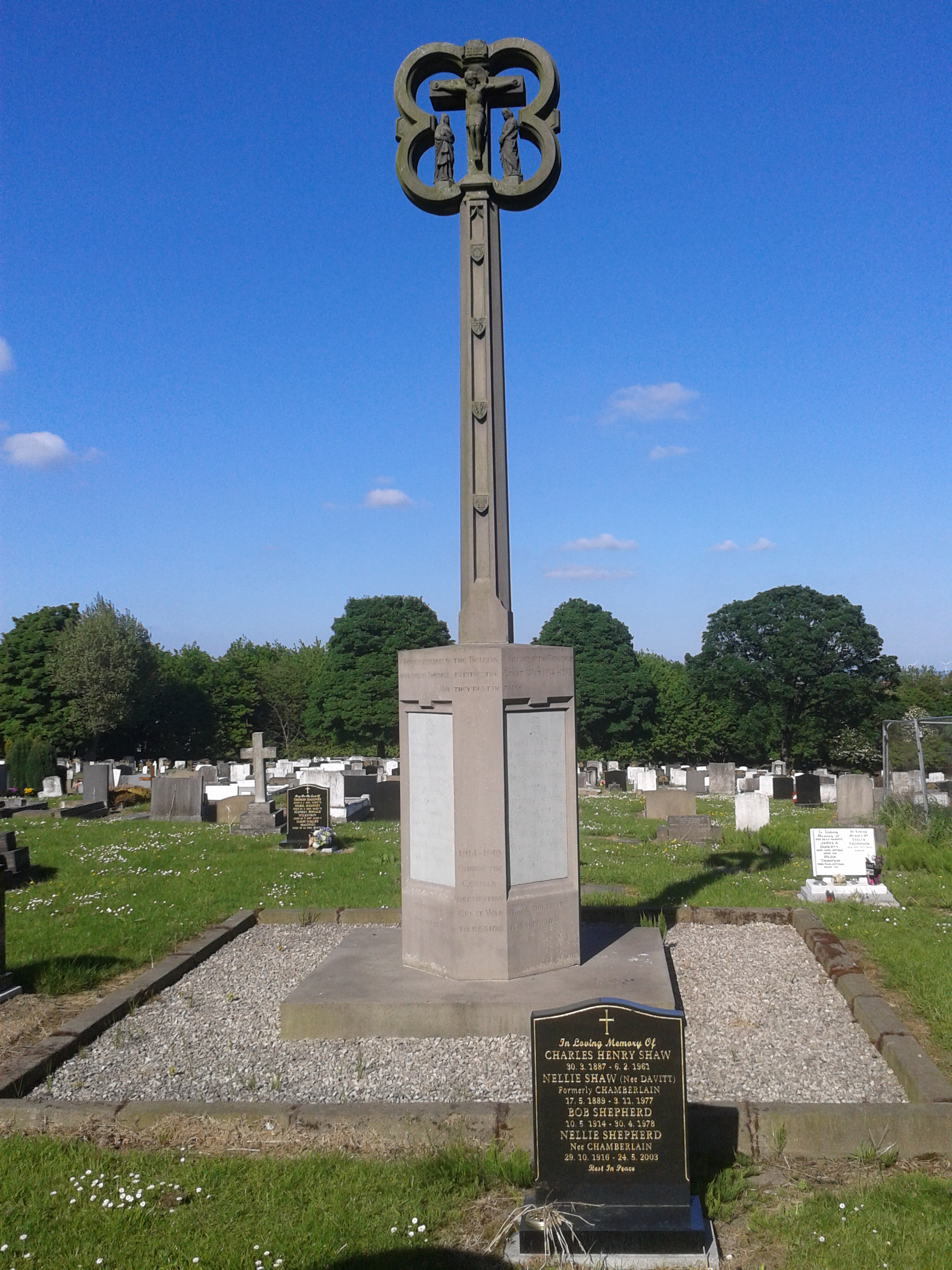
Belgian War Memorial

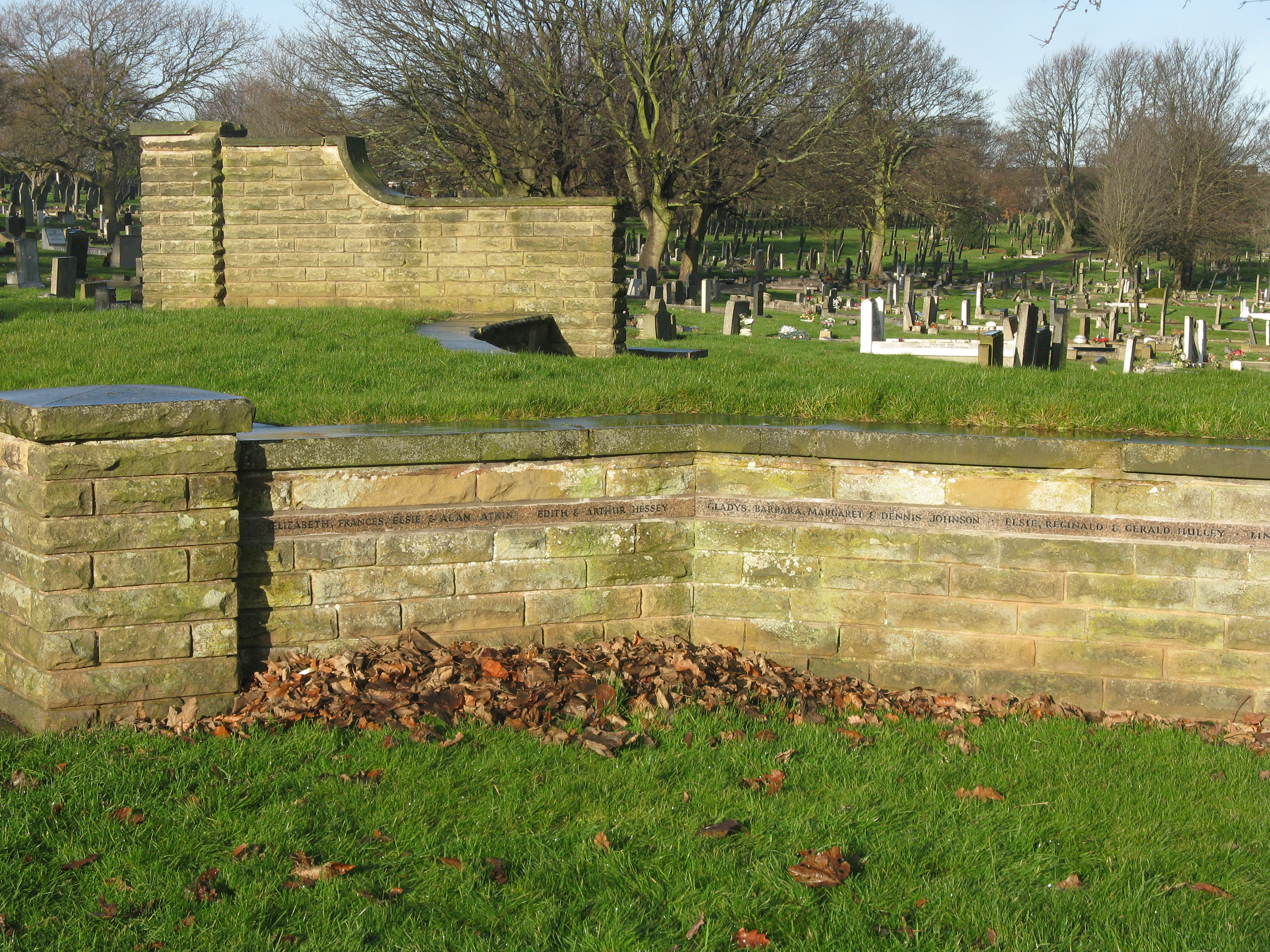
Blitz Grave

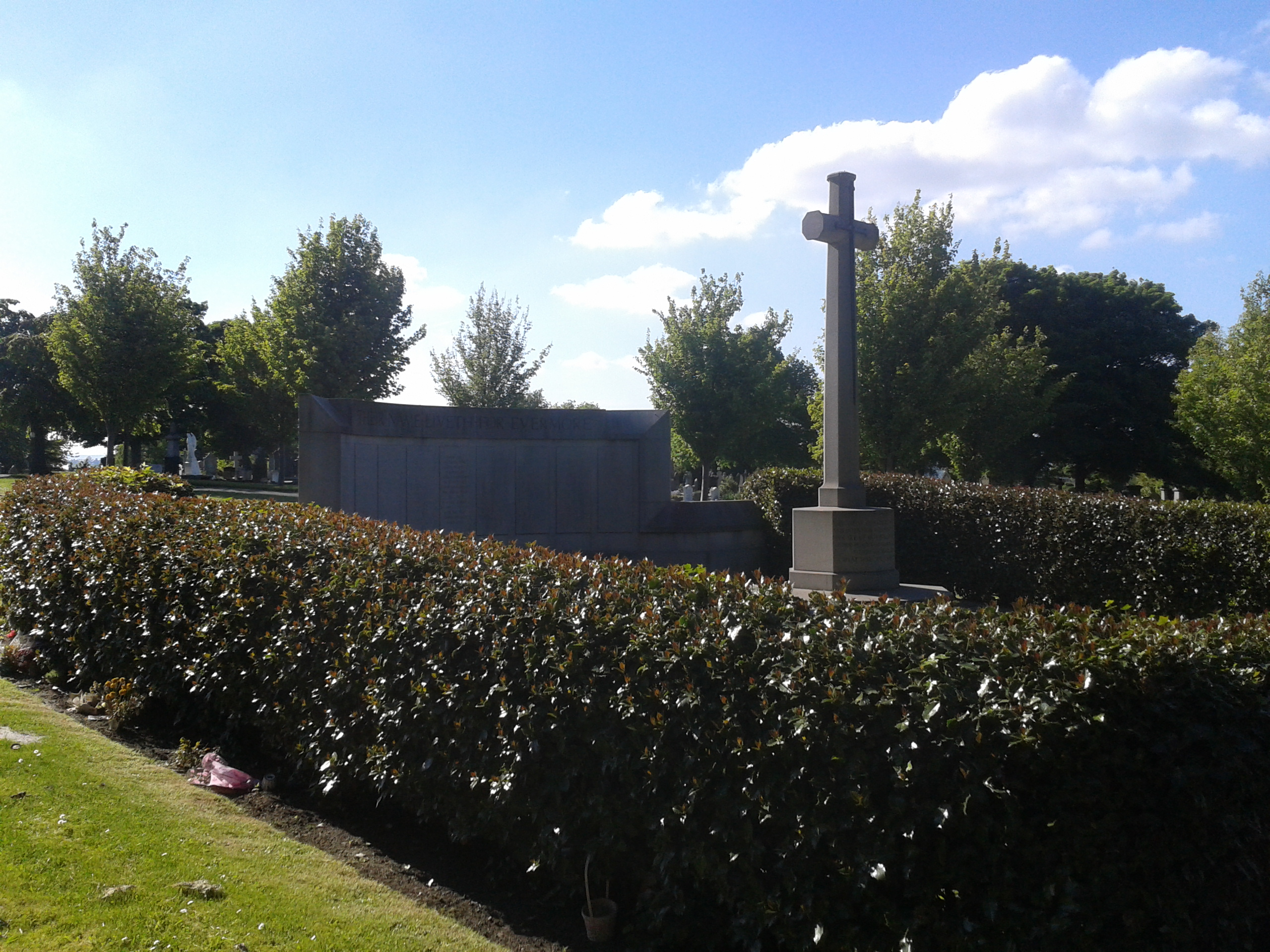
Blomfield War Memorial

== Notable burials or cremations ==
- Rear-Admiral Gerald Cartmell Harrison (1883-1943), Royal Navy officer and cricketer - ashes scattered on the Solent.
- Reverend Arthur Herbert Procter (1890–1973), First World War Victoria Cross recipient, was cremated here – ashes buried at Sheffield Cathedral.
- Thomas Worsley Staniforth (1845–1909), hymn writer.
