= Lucienne Favre =

French writer and playwright (1894–1958)

- Born: 4 January 1894; Paris
- Died: 21 March 1958 (aged 64); Paris
- Occupations: Novelist; Playwright

Lucienne Favre (4 January 1894 – 21 March 1958) was a 20th-century French writer and playwright. She was an algerianist. She was among the first to doubt the authenticity of the Muslim persona of the Jewish-Algerian writer Elissa Rhaïs.

== Publications ==
Novels

- 1925: Dimitri et la Mort, Ferenczi et fils
- 1926: Bab-el-Oued, Crès et Cie
- 1927: L'Homme derrière le mur, preface by Pierre Mac Orlan, Crès et Cie
- 1929: La Noce, ed. Bernard Grasset
- 1930: Orientale 1930, Bernard Grasset, « Les Écrits », 1930; Grand Prix littéraire d'Algérie
- 1933: Tout l'inconnu de la Casbah d'Alger, illustrations by Charles Brouty, Alger, Baconnier
- 1936: « Un dimanche dans la Casbah », Les Œuvres littéraires issue 184, October 1936
- 1941: Mille et un jours, les aventures de la belle Doudjda, Gallimard
- 1937: Dans la Casbah, Grasset
- 1939: Le Bain juif, Grasset
- 1942: Mourad, La Toison d'or
- 1946: Doudjda, Denoël
- 1948: Mourad II, Denoël

Theatre

- 1934: Isabelle d'Afrique
- 1935: Prosper, légende en quatre parties et douze tableaux, Alger, Baconnier, 1935; directed by Gaston Baty at the Théâtre Montparnasse

== Translations ==
- The Temptations of Mourad, translated from the French by Willard R. Trask, New York, W. Morrow, 1948

== See also ==
- Algerianism

== Bibliography ==
- Denise Brahimi, Femmes arabes et sœurs musulmanes, Tierce, 1984, p. 75
- Sakina Messaadi, Les romancières coloniales et la femme colonisée : contribution à une étude de la littérature coloniale en Algérie dans la première moitié du XXe siècle, Éditions ANEP, 2004, p. 44
- Écrivains français d'Algérie et société coloniale 1900-1950, Éditions Kailash, « Les Cahiers de la Sielec #5 », 2008
