= Elissa Rhaïs =

Jewish-Algerian writer

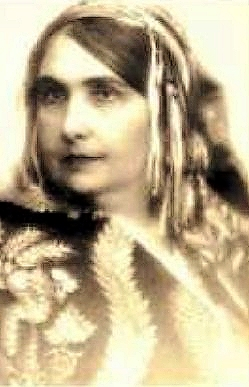
- Born: Rosine Boumendil; 12 December 1876; Blida
- Died: 18 August 1940 (aged 63); Blida
- Citizenship: Algeria
- Occupation: Writer
- Writing career
- Pen name: Elissa Rhaïs
- Language: French
- Genre: Romance
- Notable work: Saâda the Moroccan

Elissa Rhaïs (Hebrew: אליסה ראיס), born Rosine Boumendil (12 December 1876 – 18 August 1940) was a Jewish-Algerian writer, who adopted the persona of a Muslim woman who had escaped from a harem to further her literary career. Her novels were popular in her lifetime, but declined; interest in her life was revived in the 1980s by a claim that all her publications had been ghost-written and that she was illiterate.

== Biography ==
=== Early life ===
Rosine Boumendil was born on 12 December 1876 in Blida to a Jewish family of modest means. Her father, Jacob, was a baker and her mother, Mazaltov (born Seror) was a housewife. She went to a local school until she was placed as a domestic in a Jewish family at the age of twelve. Later, she claimed she had attended the "École des Religieuses de la Doctrine Chrétienne", although it did not open until her 20s. At 18 years old, she married a rabbi named Moïse Amar. The couple had three children: a daughter, who died at eleven years old; a son, Jacob-Raymond (1902-1987); another daughter Mireille (1908-1930). Jacob-Raymond became also a writer and a journalist better known as Roland Rhaïs. He was one of the few Algerian Jews to obtain Algerian nationality after the independence.

Rosine Boumendil and Amar divorced when she was 38 and she remarried a merchant, Mordecai Chemouil. They lived in a villa called the Villa des Fleurs in Algiers, where she opened a literary salon. She became known as a storyteller, claiming that her stories were passed down to her by her mother and grandmother, and therefore part of the rich folk heritage of her native region. She was encouraged by literary critics, such as Louis Bertrand, to send her stories to literary magazines.

=== Literary career ===
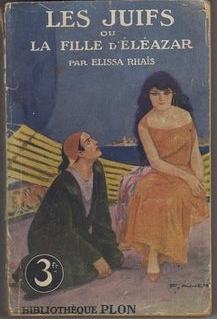
Elissa Rhais- Eleazar

In 1919 Boumendil moved to Paris to pursue a literary career. The novelist and critic Louis Bertrand had written a letter of introduction for her to René Doumic, the editor of the Revue des Deux Mondes, who shortly after published five of her short stories. Subsequently, her first novel, Saada the Moroccan was published by Plon, a Parisian publishing house, using for the first time her pseudonym, Elissa Rhaïs. Saada the Moroccan was a bestseller, eventually running to twenty-six editions. From this time, Rhaïs began to present herself as a Muslim woman who had escaped from a harem, but how instrumental she was in this new persona's construction, or indeed whether she wrote the book and the others that followed at all, has been questioned. It has been suggested that her new identity was created as marketing ploy orchestrated by Louis Bertrand and René Doumic; alternatively that it was an invention of Rhaïs herself.

From 1919 to 1930, numerous novels, novellas and short stories were published under Elissa Rhaïs' name, mostly romances that are set in an exotic north African settings featuring female heroines and Muslim culture in the period surrounding the First World War. Some of her work reflected current affairs: for example La riffaine (1929) was a novel set in the Rif War. They were translated into Norwegian, Finnish, Swedish and Russian.

Rhaïs did establish a literary salon in Paris, which was frequented by writers such as Colette, Paul Morand, Jean Amrouche, as well as the actress Sarah Bernhardt. There, Rhaïs dressed in combinations of Berber and Muslim clothing, suggesting an exotic background which was popularised with a cultural fascination at the time for all things "Oriental". She spoke out against the emancipation of Arab women, noting in Turkey it had led to "widespread immorality". Her popularity in France waned from around 1930, which coincided with the death of her daughter and increasing criticism of the persona in Algeria. Rhaïs retired from public life.

=== Later life ===
During the 1930s, Rhaïs' popularity waned and she returned to live in Blida. She died there on 18 August 1940.

== Selected works ==
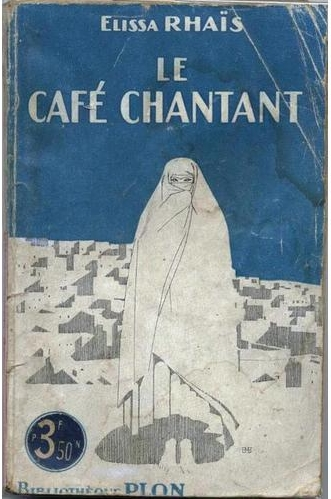
Elissa Rhais – Cafe chantant

=== Novels ===
- Saâda (Paris: 1919)
- Le Café chantant (Paris: 1920)
- Les Juifs ou la fille d’Eléazar (Paris: 1921)
- La Fille des pachas (Paris: 1922)
- La Fille du douar (Paris: 1924)
- La Chemise qui porte bonheur (Paris: 1925)
- L'Andalouse (Paris: 1925)
- Le Mariage de Hanifa (Paris: 1926)
- Le Sein blanc (Paris: 1928)
- Par la voix de la musique (Paris: 1927)
- La Riffaine (Paris: 1929)
- Petits Pachas en exil (Paris: 1929)
- La Convertie (Paris: 1930)

=== Theatre ===
- Le parfum, la femme et la prière (1933)

=== Short stories ===
- Enfants de Palestine in the Weekly Review (August 1931)
- Judith in Le Journal du 15 April 1939 at 24 April 1939

== Reception ==
Whilst popular at the time, her novels were not critically acclaimed. They have been accused of perpetuating stereotypes of Muslim sexuality. Her works were more popular in France than Algeria, but she did have support there from Robert Randau (fr), a leading literary figure there.

At the time there was some doubt about her authenticity, with the novelist Lucienne Favre, writing:

“It seems that in France, we love the Moors in all conditions. This is why there is an old Jewess, a former rabbi's wife, who masquerades as an Arab, and falsely tells stories about our race and our traditions. She thus earns a lot of money, she says."

== Legacy ==
Regardless of the situation that the novels were produced in, Rhaïs has an important place in Judeo-Maghrebian literature, as an early female Jewish-Algerian writer. However her life has continued to be a source of intrigue and fantasy in the media, due to the publication of the novel Elissa Rhaïs, un roman and the subsequent television production.

=== The Tabet Affair ===
In 1982, Paul Tabet, the son of Raoul Tabet, who was both the nephew and the lover of Rhaïs, published at Grasset a book in which he affirmed that his father confessed to him that he was the real author of the novels attributed to Rhaïs. This book caused a sensation in the media and Paul Tabet was interviewed by Bernard Pivot on Apostrophes on 7 May 1982. However, the majority of academic critics specializing in French-speaking Maghreb literature, consider Tabet's allegations to be unlikely. Denise Brahimi, writing in the introduction entitled Lire Elissa Rhaïs speaks of "a poor scandal".

The TV movie Le secret d'Elissa Rhaïs was filmed in 1993 by the director Jacques Otmezguine (fr), based on the book by Paul Tabet but in a romanticized way.
