= Musée Arménien de France =

Museum in Paris, France

Coordinates: 48°52′18″N 2°16′53″E

The Musée Arménien de France is a private museum of Armenian art and archaeology located in the 16th arrondissement of Paris at Fondation Nourhan Fringhian, 59 avenue Foch, Paris, France.

The museum was established in 1949 by Nourhan Fringhian, and has been irregularly open to the public since inception. It represents the culture and traditions of Armenia through ceramics, translated Bibles and other liturgical works, religious objects, amulets, paintings, and about 500 coins.

The museum is currently closed to the public, but the collection remains presented on its website www.le-maf.com.

== See also ==
- List of museums in Paris
