= André Servier =

French critic of Islam

André Servier was a historian who lived in French Algeria at the beginning of the 20th century.

== Career ==
He was chief editor of La Dépêche de Constantine, a newspaper from the city of Constantine in northeastern Algeria. Servier deeply studied North African customs, Ibn Ishaq's Sira, the Ottoman Empire, and the emerging Panislamic movement alongside rising nationalism in the Maghreb and the Middle East. Servier saw himself as continuing Louis Bertrand's work, but adapted to the Islamic background.

A defender of Modernity and European colonization, Servier favored reflective morality against customary morality or authority-enforced puritanism. He had strong opinions about Islam and about the intellectual superiority of European thought and its institutions. He defended the philosophical thought and work of the Western world as a philosophy founded on the idea of freedom and enlightened reason for mankind.

== Main works ==
- Le Nationalisme Musulman en Egypte, en Tunisie, en Algérie : le péril de l'avenir, Constantine, M. Boet. 1913
- L’Islam et la Psychologie du Musulman, Paris, 1923
- Le problème tunisien et la question du peuplement français, 1925

== See also ==
- Louis Bertrand
- Religious law
- Secular ethics
