= René Lenormand =

French composer

René Lenormand (1846–1932), was a French composer, father of playwright Henri-René Lenormand (1882–1951). He was author of Étude sur l'harmonie moderne and well known as a composer of mélodies and music teacher. His students included Marcel Labey.

== Works, editions and recordings ==
Book:

- A Study of Modern Harmony (Etude sur l'harmonie moderne) - Paris 1912; English translation by Herbert Antcliffe, Boston 1915.

Piano Trio Op.30 in G minor (1893) for piano, violin and cello. This trio was recorded by Trio Chausson (Mirare, 2012) Trio Chausson

Several Songs, of which:

- La mort des amants
- Bien loin d'ici
