= Paul Demasy =

Belgian playwright (1884 – 1974)

- Born: Léopold-Benoît-Joseph Paulus; 21 March 1884; Liège
- Died: 30 January 1974 (aged 89); Neuilly-sur-Seine
- Occupation: Playwright

Paul Demasy (21 March 1884 – 30 January 1974) was a francophone Belgian playwright.

== Main works ==
Theatre

- 1919: La Tragédie d'Alexandre
- 1924: Jésus de Nazareth
- 1925: La Cavalière Elsa
- 1926: Dalilah
- 1933: Milmort
- 1925: Panurge
- 1937: Midi à quatorze heures
- 1939: L'Homme de nuit
- 1959: Materna
- 1959: Vannina ou la Survivante
- 1964: L'Indésirable

== Bibliography ==
- Daniel Droixhe, « Le désarroi démocratique dans Panurge (1935) de Paul Demasy », Bruxelles, Académie royale de langue et de littérature françaises de Belgique, 2007.
