= Henri-René Lenormand =

French playwright (1882–1951)

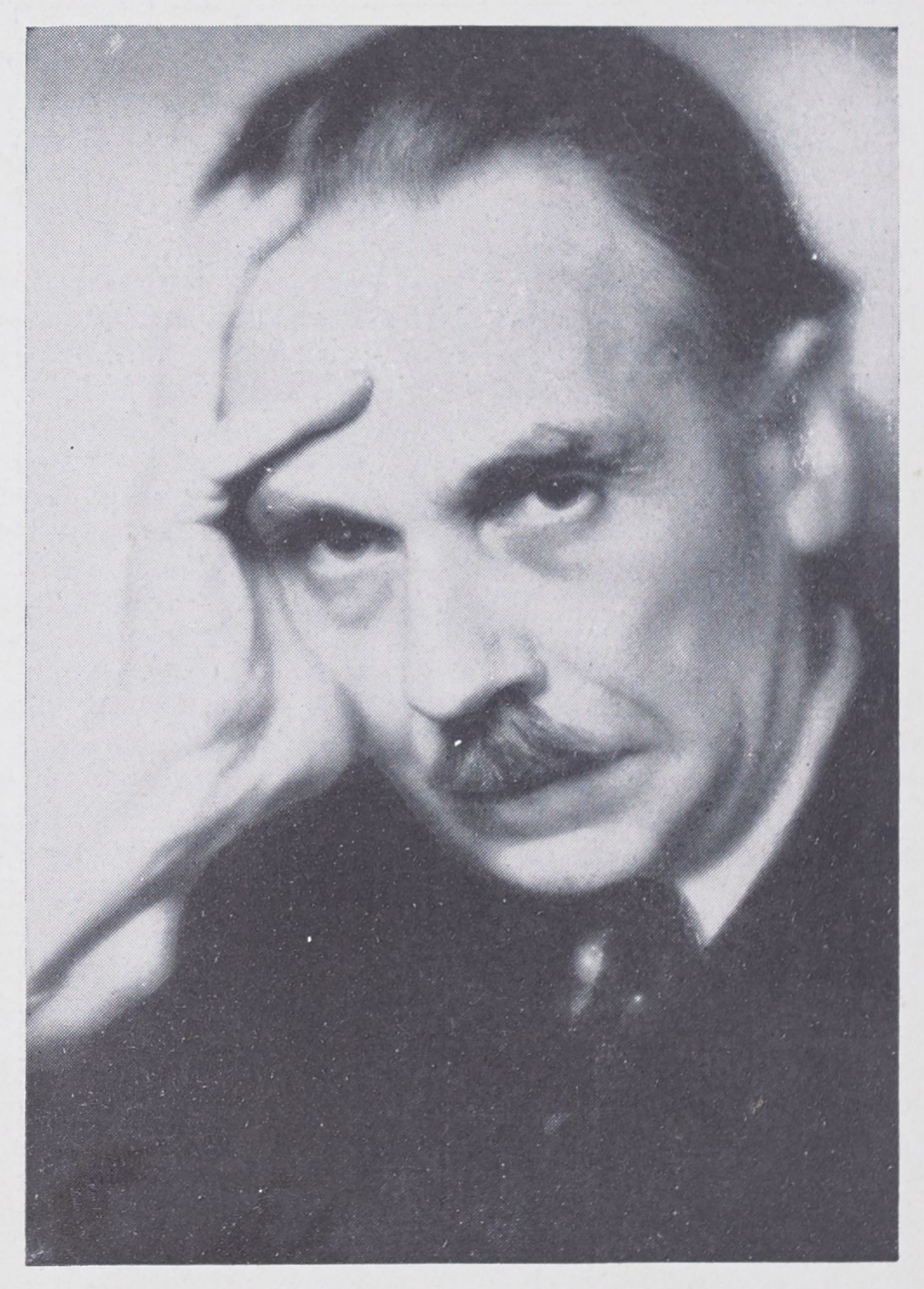
Henri-René Lenormand

Henri-René Lenormand (3 May 1882 - 16 February 1951) was a French playwright. He was born on 3 May 1882 in Paris. His plays, steeped in symbolism, were recognized for their explorations of subconscious motivation, deeply reflecting the influence of the theories of Sigmund Freud. He was the son of a composer, René Lenormand, and was educated at the University of Paris. He married Dutch actress Marie Kalff. Lenormand died on 16 February 1951 in Paris.

== Bibliography ==
- Le Cachet Rouge (1900)
- La Grande Mort (1905)
- Au Désert (1905)
- Le Réveil de l'instinct (1908)
- Les Possédés (1909)
- Terres Chaudes (1913)
- Les Ratés (1920)
- Les Mangeurs de Rêves (1922)
- Mixture (1927)
- La Folle du Ciel (1936)
- Les Pitoëff, souvenirs (1943)
- Confessions d'un auter dramatique (1949)
- Marguerite Jamois (1950)
