= Albert-Jean =

French poet, novelist and playwright

- Born: Marie, Joseph, Albert, François Jean; 28 June 1892; Capestang
- Died: 7 September 1975 (aged 83); Paris
- Occupations: Novelist; Playwright
- Spouse: Italia Ugazio (1893-1995)

Albert-Jean, pen name for Marie, Joseph, Albert, François Jean (28 June 1892 – 7 September 1975), was a 20th-century French poet, novelist and playwright.

Familiar with the Grand-Guignol, Albert-Jean was president of the Société des gens de lettres.

== Main publications ==
Poetry

- 1912: La Pluie au printemps
- 1913: L'Ombre des fumées

Novels

- 1914: Maude et les trois jeunes gens
- 1920: La Dame aux écailles
- 1925: Le Singe. This novel, co-written with Maurice Renard features the writer J.-H. Rosny aîné.
- 1926: Une rose à la main
- 1942: Belles du sud
- 1946: La Maison du vent
- 1950: Le Secret de Barbe-Bleue
- 1950: Amours à Saint-Domingue

Theatre

- 1925: L'étrange histoire du Professeur Stierbecke
- 1925: L'Amant de la morte (at the Grand-Guignol)
- 1933: 600 000 francs par mois
- 1932: Tantale
