= Café de la Rotonde =

Café in Montparnasse, Paris, France

Coordinates: 48°50′33″N 2°19′45″E

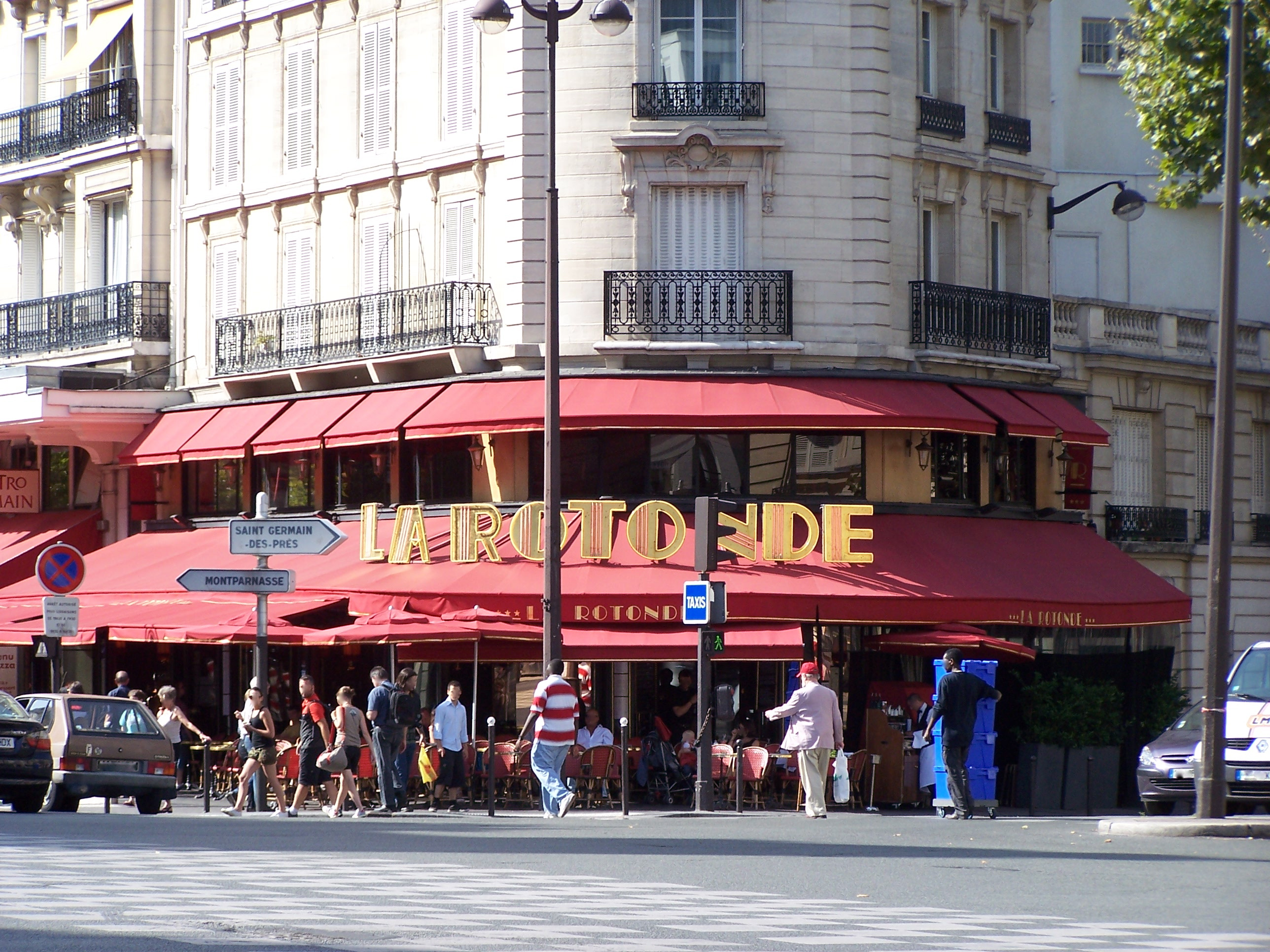
La Rotonde in 2011.

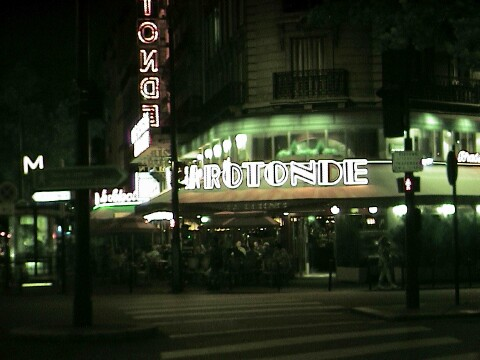
La Rotonde at night, 2002

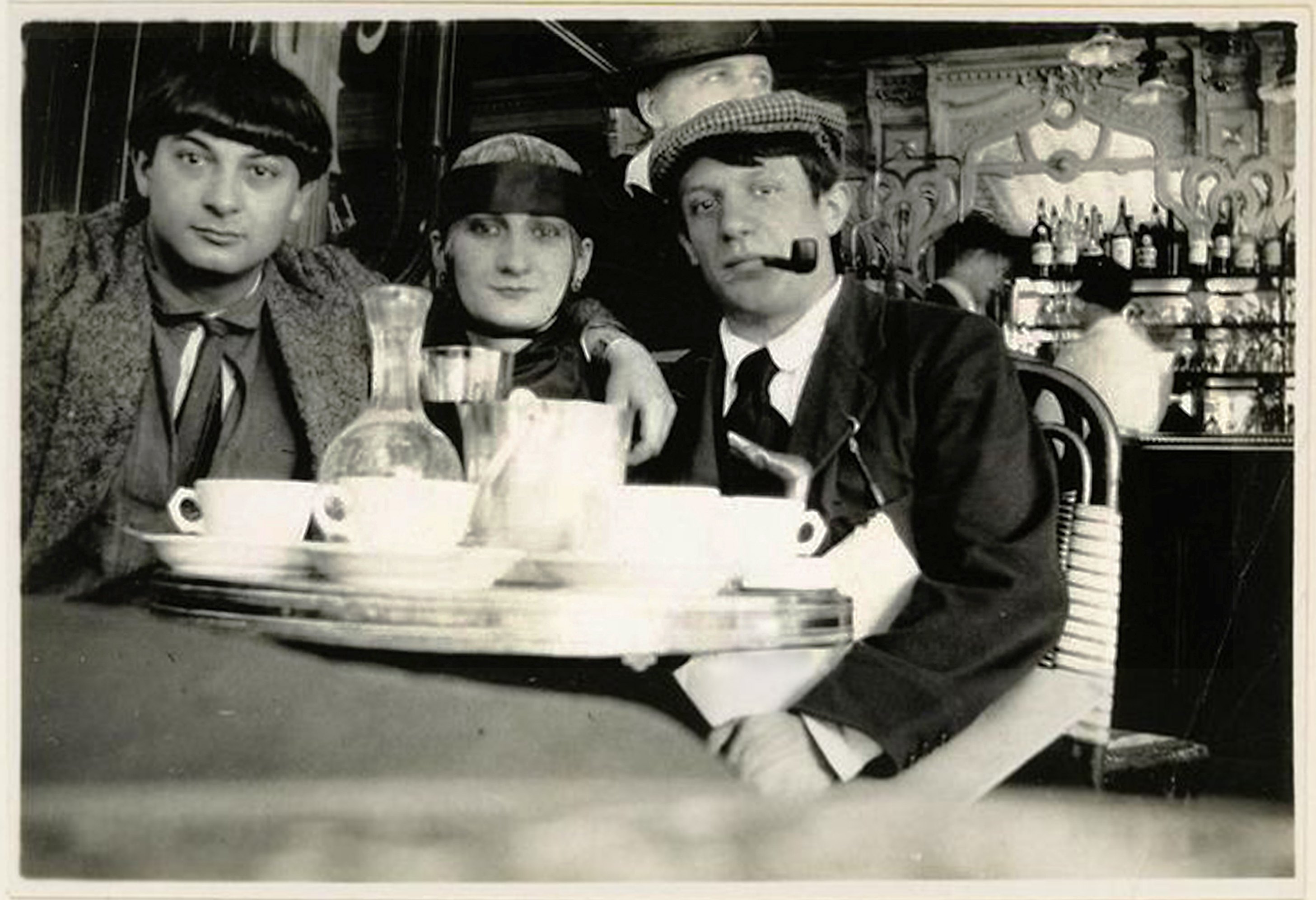
Pablo Picasso (right), Moïse Kisling (left) and model Pâquerette photographed by Jean Cocteau at Café de La Rotonde, August 1916

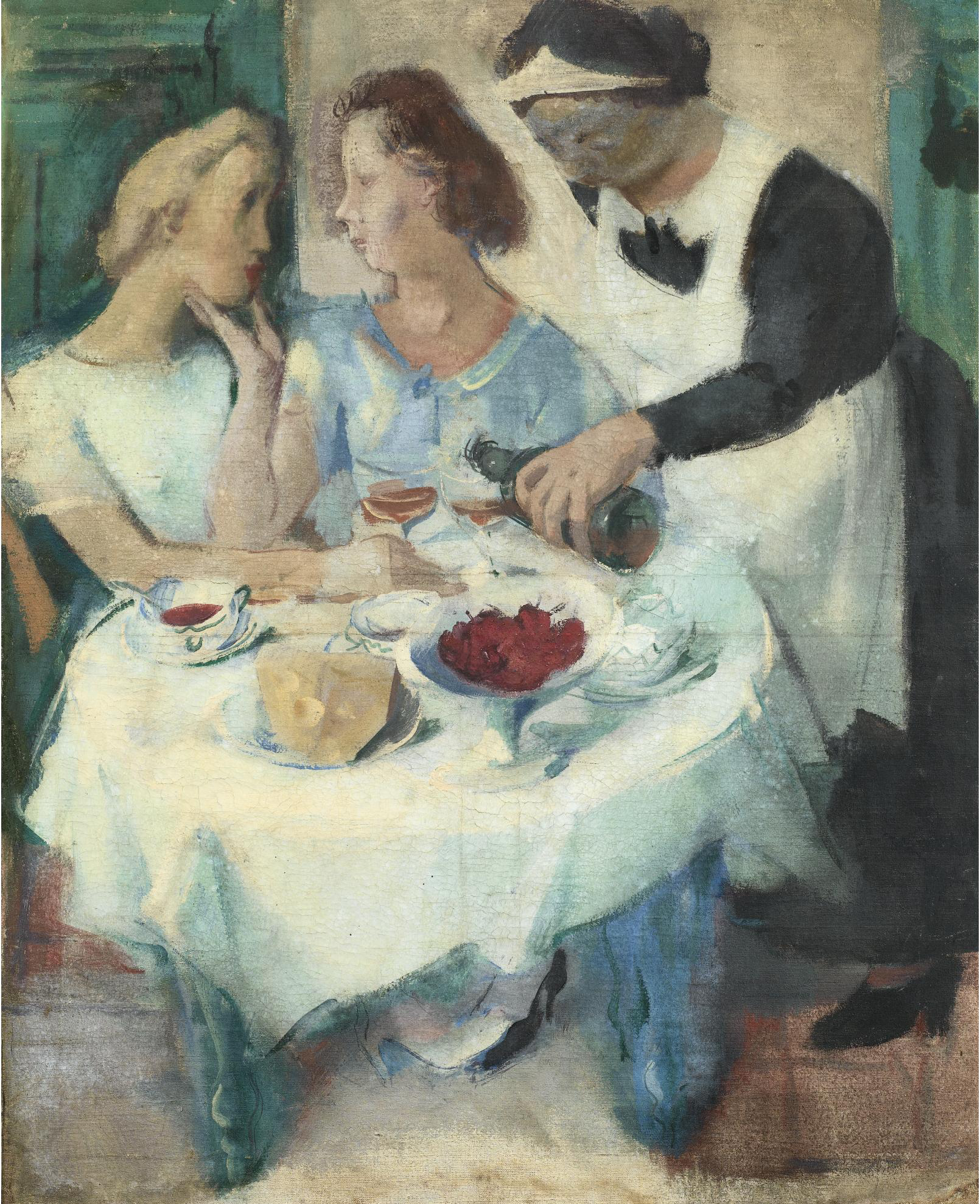
In the Café de la Rotonde (circa 1927) by Alexandre Jacovleff

The Café de la Rotonde is a famous café in the Montparnasse Quarter of Paris, France at 105 Boulevard du Montparnasse, known for its artistic milieu and good food. In its official website, La Rotonde defines itself as a brasserie and restaurant. Located on the Place de Picasso, that also holds the sculpture of Honoré de Balzac by Auguste Rodin called Monument to Balzac at the corner of Boulevard du Montparnasse and Boulevard Raspail, it was founded by Victor Libion in 1911. Based on examples established by La Closerie des Lilas (created in 1847) and Le Dôme Café (created in 1898), La Rotonde, along with La Coupole (created in 1927) and Le Select (created in 1925), was renowned as an intellectual gathering place for notable artists and writers during the interwar period due to its open atmosphere and reasonable prices. Unlike many establishments in Montparnasse, La Rotonde has retained much of its bohemian charm and continues in operation to this day as a popular and chic spot for classic French cuisine lovers and the Parisian artistic intelligentsia.

== Cultural History ==
La Rotonde was frequented by Pablo Picasso around the year 1914 as it was just down the street from his studio at 242 Boulevard Raspail, so he spent many days and nights there alongside his artist and poet friends that included Diego Rivera, Federico Cantú, Ilya Ehrenburg and Tsuguharu Foujita. When the English painter Nina Hamnett arrived in Montparnasse, on her first evening the smiling man at the next table at La Rotonde graciously introduced himself as "Modigliani, painter and Jew". They became good friends. Numerous reproduced paintings by Amedeo Modigliani fill the interior of the Café de la Rotonde today.

In the early years, proprietor Libion allowed starving artists to sit in his café for hours, nursing a ten-centime cup of coffee and looked the other way when they broke the ends from a baguette in the bread basket. If an impoverished painter couldn't pay their bill, Libion would often accept a drawing, holding it until the artist could pay. As such, there were times when the café's walls were littered with a collection of artworks, which today might fill curators of the world's greatest museums with envy. When Peggy Guggenheim moved to Paris in 1920, she increased the popularity of La Rotonde by moving herself and her entourage across the street from Le Dome because La Rotonde allowed women to smoke on the terrace and Le Dome did not.

Life in the cafe was depicted by several of the artists and writers that frequented the cafe, including Diego Rivera, Federico Cantú, Ilya Ehrenburg, and Tsuguharu Foujita, who depicted a fight in the cafe in his etching A la Rotonde of 1925. A later 1927 version, Le Café de la Rotonde, was part of the Tableaux de Paris of 1929.

Picasso portrayed two diners in the cafe in his painting In the cafe de la Rotonde in 1901; as did the Russian artist Alexandre Jacovleff a.k.a. Alexander Yevgenievich Yakovlev in the similarly titled In the Cafe de la Rotonde. Despite its title, Picasso's painting was created before the opening of La Rotonde; its setting is another café called L'Hippodrome.

Ernest Hemingway mentions La Rotonde in Chapter VI of his novel The Sun Also Rises (1926) in this passage: “The taxi stopped in front of the Rotonde. No matter what café in Montparnasse you ask a taxi-driver to bring you to from the right bank of the river, they always take you to the Rotonde.”

Billy Klüver's 1997 book, A Day with Picasso, is based on a group of photographs taken at lunch on a sunny afternoon at Café de la Rotonde in 1916 by Jean Cocteau, of Pablo Picasso and Modigliani and friends; including André Salmon, Max Jacob and Pâquerette, a model for the designer Paul Poiret.

On 6 April 2023, the outside awning was set on fire by protestors during the pension reform strikes that caused minimal long-term damage. The cafe was chosen as it's considered to be one of President Emmanuel Macron's favourite cafes.
