= Le Dôme Café =

Restaurant in Paris, France

Coordinates: 48.8419°N 2.3291°E

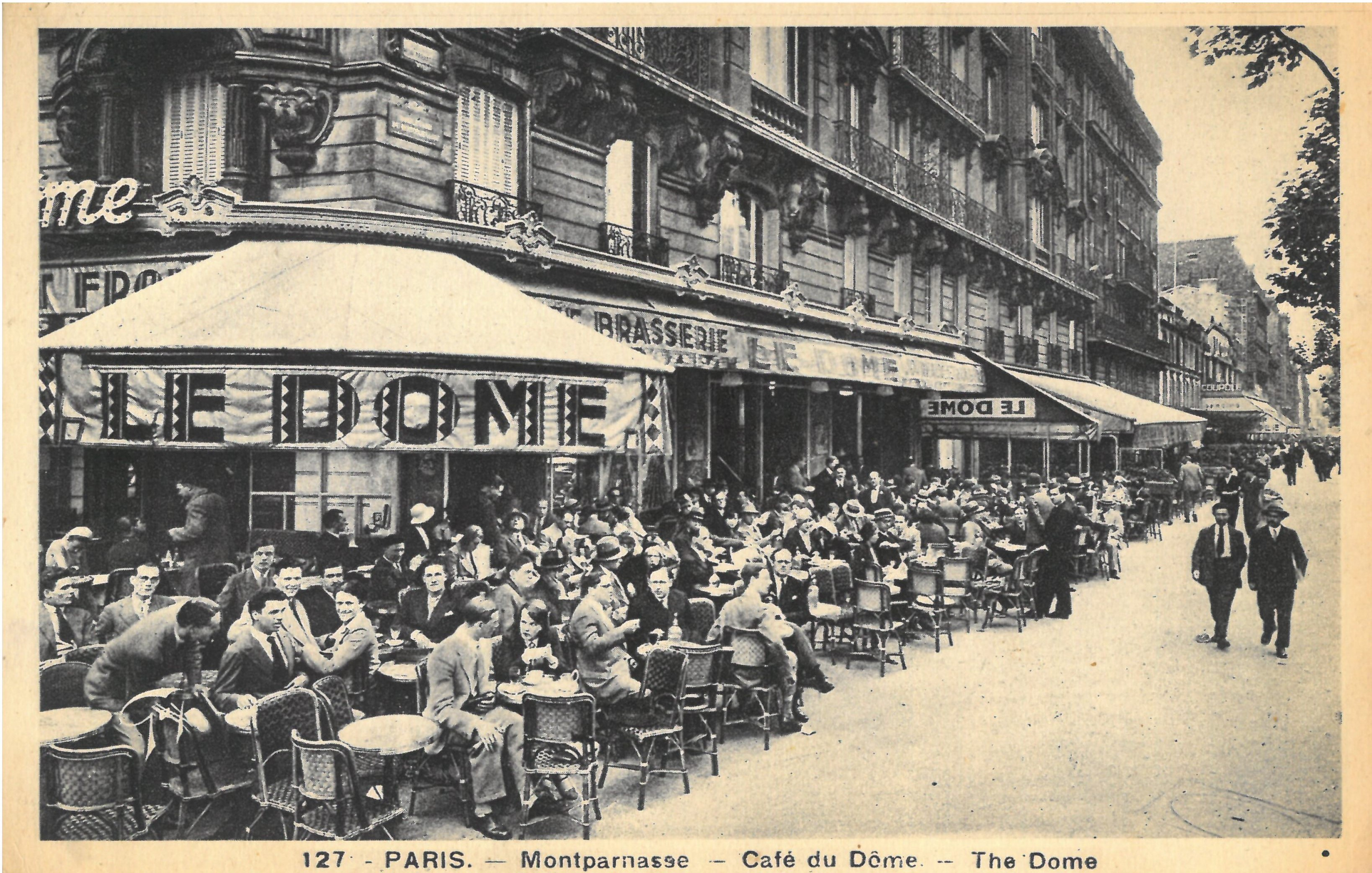
Le Dôme in the early part of the 20th century

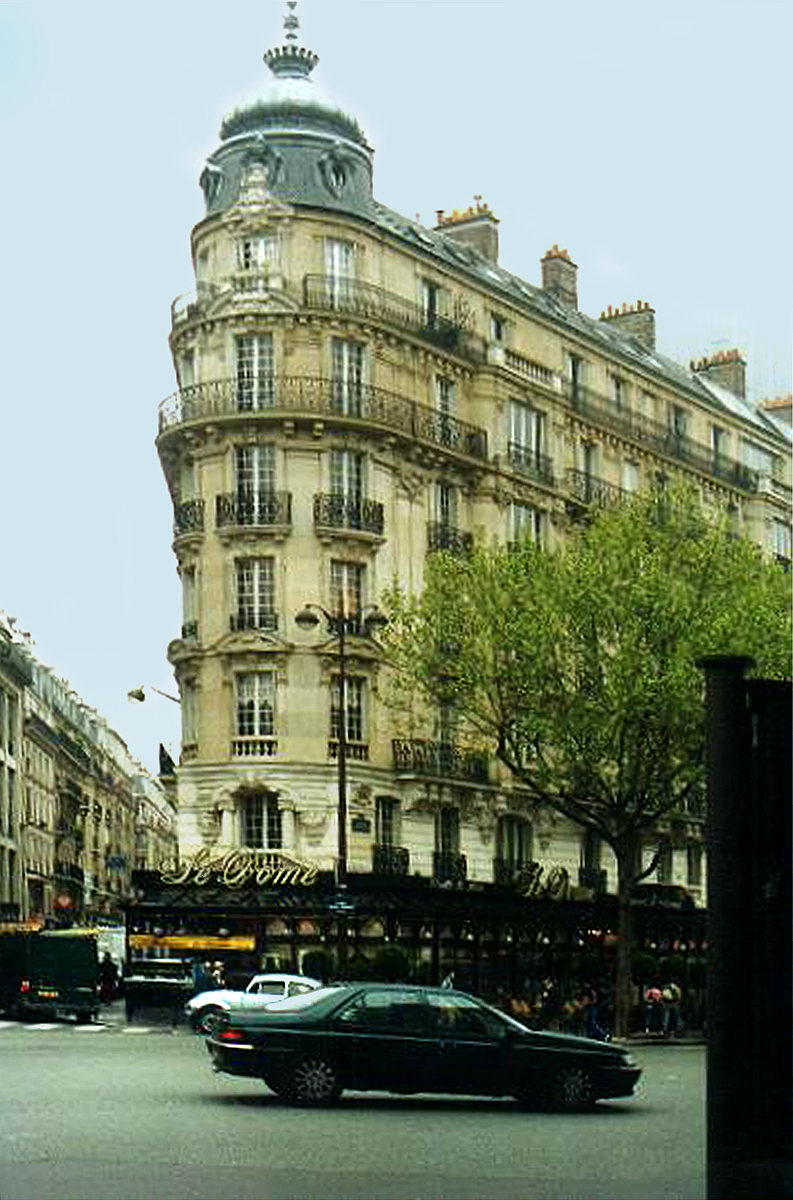
Building with the Café du Dôme on the ground floor taken in 2006

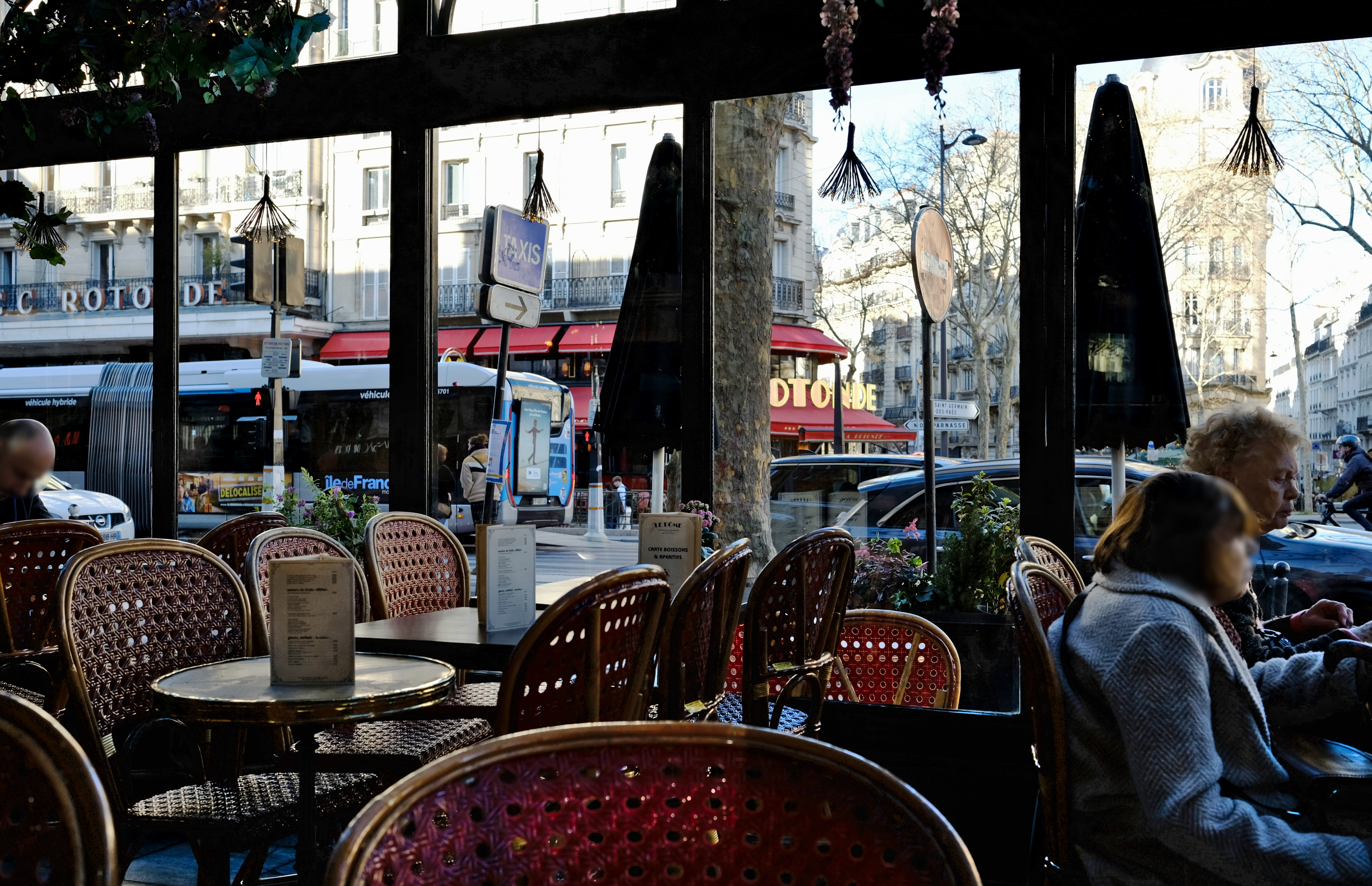
Le Dôme in 2025.

Le Dôme Café (French pronunciation: [lə dom]) or Café du Dôme is a restaurant in Montparnasse, Paris that first opened in 1898 (128 years ago). Based on the example established by La Closerie des Lilas (created in 1847) and followed by Café de la Rotonde (created in 1911), Le Select (created in 1925), and La Coupole (created in 1927), Le Dôme was renowned as an intellectual gathering place for artists and writers during the interwar period. Le Dôme created and disseminated gossip and provided message exchanges and an 'over the table' market that dealt in artistic and literary futures. It was frequented by painters and sculptors of the School of Paris as well as writers, poets, models, art connoisseurs and dealers.

Le Dôme later became the gathering place of the American literary colony and became a focal point for artists residing in Paris's Left Bank.

A poor artist used to be able to get a Saucisse de Toulouse and a plate of mashed potatoes for $1. Today, it is a top fish restaurant (the Michelin Guide once gave it one star), with a comfortably old-fashioned decor. The food writer Patricia Wells said, "I could dine at Le Dôme once a week, feasting on platters of briny oysters and their incomparable sole meunière."

== Address ==
108 bd. Montparnasse, Paris, 75014
Closest Métro: Vavin

== Dômiers ==
The term Dômiers was coined to refer to the international group of visual, and literary artists who gathered at the Café du Dôme, including:

- Lajos Tihanyi (1885-1938)
- Samuel Beckett (1906–1989)
- Walter Benjamin (1892–1940)
- Thomas Hart Benton (1889–1975)
- Robert Capa (1913–1954)
- Leonora Carrington (1917–2011)
- Henri Cartier-Bresson (1908–2004)
- Aleister Crowley (1875–1947)
- Constant Detré (1891–1945)
- Max Ernst (1891–1976)
- Leonor Fini (1907–1996)
- Ernesto de Fiori (1884–1945)
- Tsuguharu Foujita (1886–1968)
- Yitzhak Frenkel (1899–1981)
- Paul Gauguin (1848–1903)
- Sreten Stojanović (1898-1960)
- Ida Gerhardi (1862–1927)
- Khalil Gibran (1883–1931)
- Ernest Hemingway (1899–1961)
- Elmyr de Hory (1906–1976)
- Youssef Howayek (1883–1962)
- Gwen John (1876-1939)
- Wassily Kandinsky (1866–1944)
- Moïse Kisling (1891–1953)
- Eva Kotchever (1891-1943)
- Vladimir Lenin (1870–1924)
- Sinclair Lewis (1885–1951)
- Sándor Márai (1900–1989)
- Henry Miller (1891–1980)
- Amedeo Modigliani (1884–1920)
- Anaïs Nin (1903–1977)
- Méret Oppenheim (1913–1985)
- Jules Pascin (1885–1930)
- Pablo Picasso (1881–1973)
- Ezra Pound (1885–1972)
- Man Ray (1890–1976)
- Louis Schanker (1903–1981)
- Chaïm Soutine (1893–1943)
- Ernesto Sábato (1911–2010)
- Ré Soupault (1901–1996)
- Gerda Taro (1910–1937)
- Mika Waltari (1908–1979)

== References in Literature ==
- Henry Miller, Tropic of Cancer (1934)
- Elliot Paul, The Mysterious Mickey Finn: or Murder at the Cafe Du Dome (1939)
- Ernest Hemingway: references members of the Parisien literary scene meeting at the Dôme in The Torrents of Spring (1926); The Sun Also Rises (1926) and With Pascin at the Dôme in A Moveable Feast (1964)
- "Paris", lyrics by Édith Piaf
- Aleister Crowley's magical retirement frequenting Du Dome
- Simone de Beauvoir, She Came to Stay (1943)
- Josip Kosor, U Café du Dôme(1919)
- Jean-Paul Sartre, Intimacy (1939), The Age of Reason (1947)
- Ernesto Sábato, Abaddon el Exterminador (1976)
- Anaïs Nin, Delta of Venus (1977)
- W. Somerset Maugham, The Razor's Edge (1944)
- Jean Rhys, Good Morning, Midnight (1939)
- Sinclair Lewis, Dodsworth (1929)
- Pierre Drieu la Rochelle, Gilles (1939)

== See also ==
- Café de la Rotonde
- Le Select
- The School of Paris
