= Gabriel Montenegro Gutiérrez =

Salvadoran politician (1925–2014)

Third Delegate to the Salvadoran Presidency
- In office July 1, 1977 – October 15, 1979

Personal details
- Born: Gabriel Oswaldo de Jesús Montenegro Gutiérrez; October 15, 1925 Santa Ana, El Salvador
- Died: July 9, 2014 (aged 88) San Salvador, El Salvador.
- Spouse: Hilda Palomo Salazar
- Children: Five
- Parent(s): Gabriel Montenegro Soberón and Eva Gutiérrez
- Education: Purdue University
- Profession: Chemist; Entrepreneur; Politician

Gabriel Oswaldo de Jesús Montenegro Gutiérrez was a chemist, entrepreneur, and politician from El Salvador. He was also Secretary of the International Society of Naturopathic Physicians under Arthur Schramm (President), During the presidency of Carlos Humberto Romero He was fourth in line for the position of President of El Salvador.

== Early life and family ==
Gabriel Montenegro Gutiérrez was born in Santa Ana, El Salvador to Gabriel Montenegro Soberón, a Guatemalan immigrant, and Eva Gutiérrez from Santa Ana, El Salvador.

He married Hilda Palomo Salazar, a Salvadoran socialite, daughter of Manuel Palomo Trabanino and María Elda Salazar Iraheta. The former was the eldest son of Dr. Manuel Palomo Cuellar, one of the founders of the Salvadoran Red Cruz, and Angela Trabanino González. Angela was the eldest daughter of José Antonio González Portillo, the mayor of Santa Tecla, El Salvador who served several terms. José Antonio was the right hand of his brother, Santiago González Portillo, President of El Salvador (15 April 1871 – 1 February 1876), and, the later, María Elda Salazar Iraheta, a first cousin of the famous Salvadoran artists Salarrue and Toño Salazar, since she was a daughter Estaban Salazar Angulo and Matilde Iraheta, a daughter of the Salvadoran War Hero, General Francisco Iraheta Larreta.

Gabriel and Hilda had five sons: Ricardo Francisco Javier, Gabriel Ernesto, Fernando Rafael, José Eduardo and, Raul Antonio.

== Education ==
After completing his formative years in El Salvador, He continued his education in Purdue University.
