= Caroline Caugant =

French novelist

Caroline Caugant (born 1975, Paris) is a French graphic designer and novelist.

== Early life ==
Caugant was born in Paris in 1975. She was educated at the Lycée Jean Jacques Rousseau in Montmorency, Val-d'Oise.

She studied literature at Sorbonne University.

== Career ==
After graduating university, she worked as a graphic artist as well as a writer.

Caugant has written three published novels. Water (the sea, rivers, islands) is a recurring motif in her novels.

Her third novel, Insula, was shortlisted for the 2024 Evok Collection Prix Littéraire and the 2024 Prix de la Closerie des Lilas.

== Works ==
- Une baigneuse Presque ordinaire. Acmé. 2014.
- Les Heures Solaires. Éditions Stock. 2019.
  - English translation: Sunlight Hours. Hodder & Stoughton. 2020.
- Insula. Éditions de Seuil. 2024.
