= Ricardo Montenegro =

El Salvadorian businessman and politician (born 1949)

Ricardo Montenegro Palomo

President of CCIES - Chamber of Commerce and Industry of El Salvador
- In office 1991–1993
- Preceded by: Ricardo F. Simán Dabdoub
- Succeeded by: Eduardo Zablah Touché

President of FECAMCO - the Federation of Chambers of Commerce of Central America
- In office 1992–1993
- Preceded by: Emilio Bruce Jiménez
- Succeeded by: Arturo Guirola Batres

Minister of Treasury of El Salvador
- In office 1 June 1994 – 29 November 1994
- Preceded by: Edwin Henry Sagrera Bogle
- Succeeded by: Manuel Enrique Hinds Cabrera

President of INSAFORP – Salvadoran Institute of Professional Development
- In office 2011–2023

Personal details
- Born: Ricardo Francisco Javier Montenegro Palomo; 9 November 1949 (age 76) West Lafayette, Indiana, U.S.
- Spouse: Ana Lacayo de Montenegro
- Children: Two
- Parent(s): Gabriel Montenegro Gutiérrez and Hilda Palomo Salazar
- Education: Externado San José; Purdue University
- Profession: Businessman; Politician

Ricardo Francisco Javier Montenegro Palomo is a businessman and politician from El Salvador. He was the Minister of Treasury of El Salvador in the first months of Armando Calderón Sol's Presidency

== Early life and family ==
Ricardo Francisco Javier Montenegro Palomo was born on November 9, 1949, in West Lafayette, Indiana, while his father was a student at Purdue University. He was the first child of Gabriel Montenegro Gutiérrez and his wife, Hilda Palomo Salazar. While the Montenegro Palomo family was based in West Lafayette, Indiana, their second child, Gabriel Ernesto, was born.

In 1951 his family moved to San Salvador, El Salvador, where they settled down. After this move Gabriel and Hilda had three more sons, Fernando Rafael, José Eduardo and Raul Antonio.

His father Dr. Gabriel Montenegro Gutiérrez was born to Gabriel Montenegro Soberón, a Guatemalan immigrant, and Eva Gutiérrez from Santa Ana, El Salvador. Dr. Montenegro was a chemist and entrepreneur, who during the presidency of Carlos Humberto Romero was fourth in line for the position of President of El Salvador.

His mother, Hilda Palomo Salazar, was the daughter of Manuel Palomo Trabanino and María Elda Salazar Iraheta. The former was the eldest son of Dr. Manuel Palomo Cuellar, one of the founders of the Salvadoran Red Cruz, and Angela Trabanino González. Angela was the eldest daughter of José Antonio González Portillo, the mayor of Santa Tecla, El Salvador who served several terms. José Antonio was the right hand of his brother, Santiago González Portillo, President of El Salvador (15 April 1871 – 1 February 1876), and, the later, María Elda Salazar Iraheta, a first cousin of the famous Salvadoran artists Salarrue and Toño Salazar, since she was a daughter of Estaban Salazar Angulo and Matilde Iraheta, a daughter of the Salvadoran War Hero, General Francisco Iraheta Larreta.

== Education ==
Montenegro attended Externado San José a private school in San Salvador, El Salvador. He continued his education in Purdue University his family's alma mater.

== 1980s ==
In 1983 Ricardo Montenegro Palomo became one of the founding members of FUSADES, The Salvadoran Foundation for Economic and Social Development.

== 1990s ==
In 1991 Ricardo Montenegro Palomo was named President of CCIES (Chamber of Commerce and Industry of El Salvador) a title he held until 1993. During his time as President of CCIES, he also held the Presidency FECAMCO (Federation of Chambers of Commerce of Central America), for the 1992 term.

Ricardo Montenegro Palomo was part of the Salvadoran delegates that participated in the 1992 Peace Talks at Chapultepec Castle in Mexico City.

In 1994, during the first months Armando Calderón Sol's presidency, he was named Minister of Treasury of El Salvador.

Montenegro subsequently became the CEO of UNIFERSA, a large fertilizer company in El Salvador that was formed in 1999 by the merger of three previously existing companies, one of which was SERTESA.

== Post-retirement ==
After retiring from the private sector, Ricardo Montenegro, has remained active in the community promoting education. He was the President of INSAFORP – Salvadoran Institute of Professional Development until December 2023 when INSAFORP closed its operations in El Salvador.
