= Le Select =

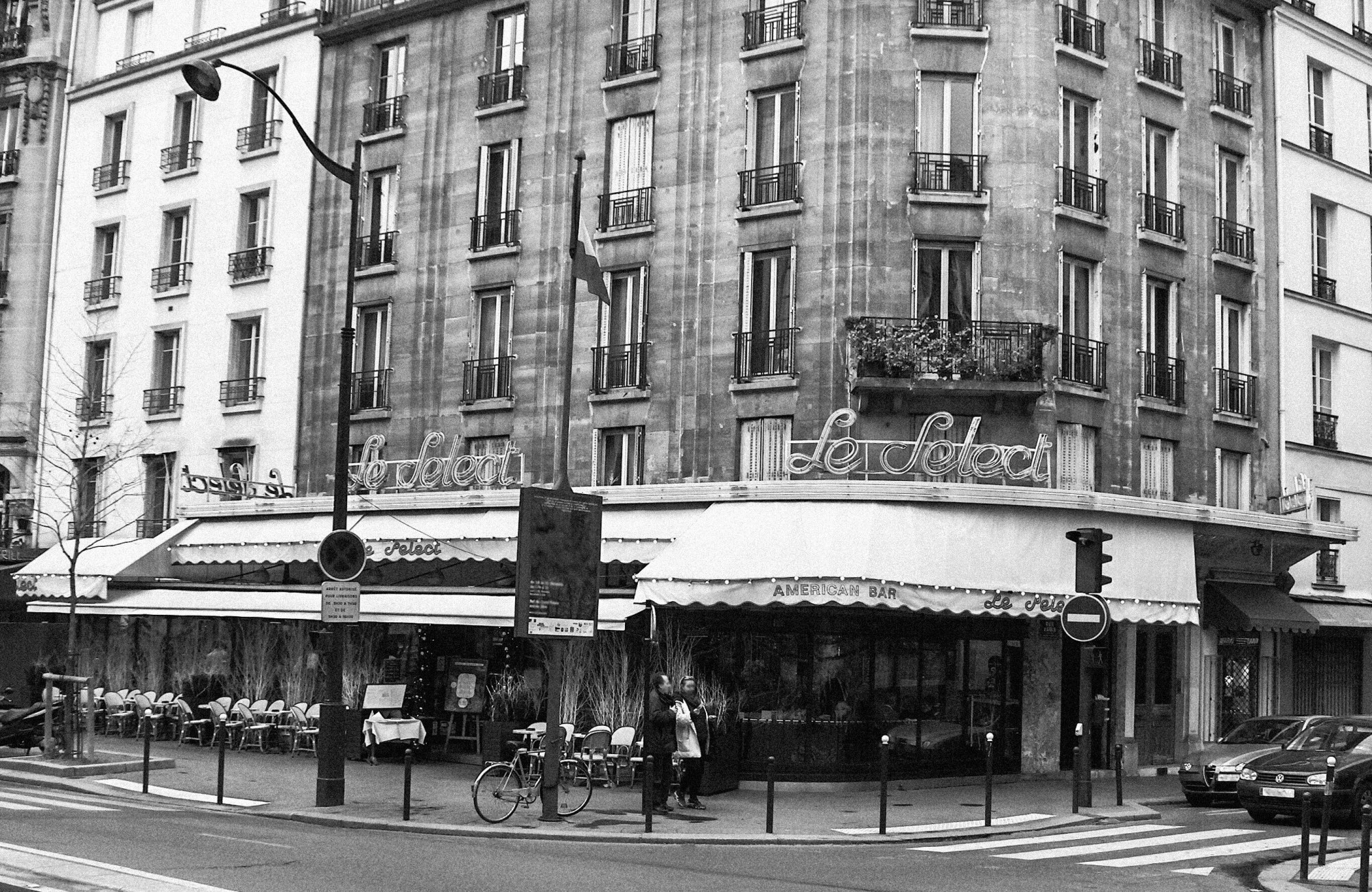
- Interactive map of Le Select

Restaurant information
- Established: 1923
- Location: 99, boulevard du Montparnasse, Paris, France
- Website: www.leselectmontparnasse.fr/en/

Le Select is a Parisian brasserie founded in 1923 in the 6th arrondissement at 99 Boulevard Montparnasse, in the Notre-Dame-des-Champs neighborhood. It was one of the more prominent meeting places of the Parisian intellectuals between the two world wars, with a significant place in the Bohemian Culture of the period.

== History ==
Along with Le Dôme, La Rotonde, Closerie des Lilas and La Coupole, Le Select was one of the cafés for artists and intellectuals that animated the life of Montparnasse, particularly around the Vavin crossroads, which is now the Pablo Picasso plaza.

Scott Fitzgerald, Ernest Hemingway, Picasso, and Agnès Capri were regulars.

During the Nazi Occupation, prominent homosexual figures from the artistic milieu such as Serge Lifar, Jean Marais, Suzy Solidor, and Antoinette Hendrika Nijhoff-Wind frequented it regularly, as well as places like Le Monocle, Chez Jane Stick, and Le Bœuf sur le toit.

Following the Second World War, the cafe was still frequented by what remained of the Jewish School of Paris, including Isaac Frenkel, Mane-Katz and others artists.
