= Montparnasse =

Neighbourhood of Paris, France

Coordinates: 48°50′N 2°19′E

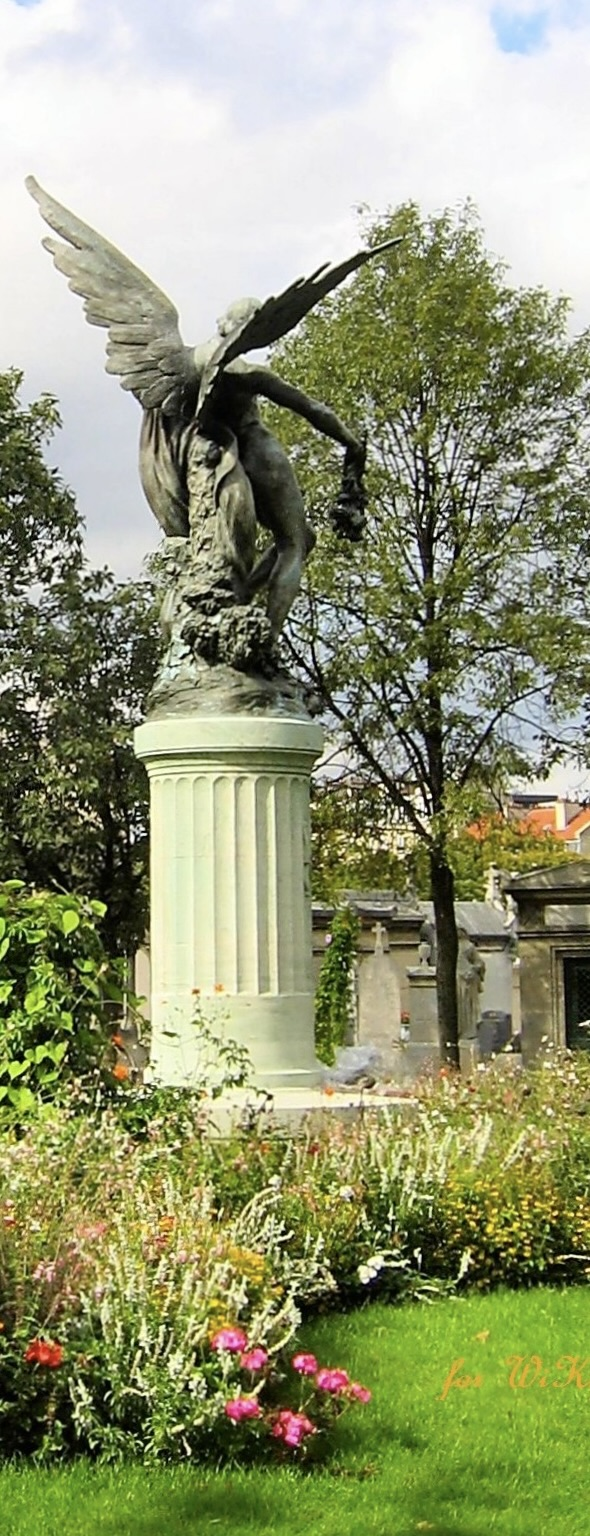
Montparnasse cemetery

Montparnasse (French: [mɔ̃paʁnas]) is an area in the south of Paris, France, on the left bank of the river Seine, centred at the crossroads of the Boulevard du Montparnasse and the Rue de Rennes, between the Rue de Rennes and boulevard Raspail. It is split between the 6th, 14th, and 15th arrondissements of the city. Montparnasse has been part of Paris since 1669.

The area also gives its name to:

- Gare Montparnasse: trains to Brittany, TGV to Rennes, Tours, Bordeaux, Le Mans; rebuilt as a modern TGV station;
- The large Montparnasse – Bienvenüe métro station;
- Cimetière du Montparnasse: the Montparnasse Cemetery, where, among other celebrities, Charles Baudelaire, Constantin Brâncuși, Jean-Paul Sartre, Simone de Beauvoir, Man Ray, Samuel Beckett, Serge Gainsbourg and Susan Sontag are buried;
- Tour Montparnasse, a lone skyscraper.

Students in the 17th century who came to recite poetry in the hilly neighbourhood nicknamed it after "Mount Parnassus", home to the nine Muses of arts and sciences in Greek mythology. The hill was levelled to construct the Boulevard Montparnasse in the 18th century. During the French Revolution many dance halls and cabarets opened their doors, becoming gathering points for artists. The area is also known for cafés and bars, such as the Breton restaurants specialising in crêpes (thin pancakes) located a few blocks from the Gare Montparnasse. The Pasteur Institute is located in the area. Beneath the ground are tunnels of the Catacombs of Paris.

During the Interwar period, Montparnasse was the central hub of the School of Paris.

== Artistic hub ==
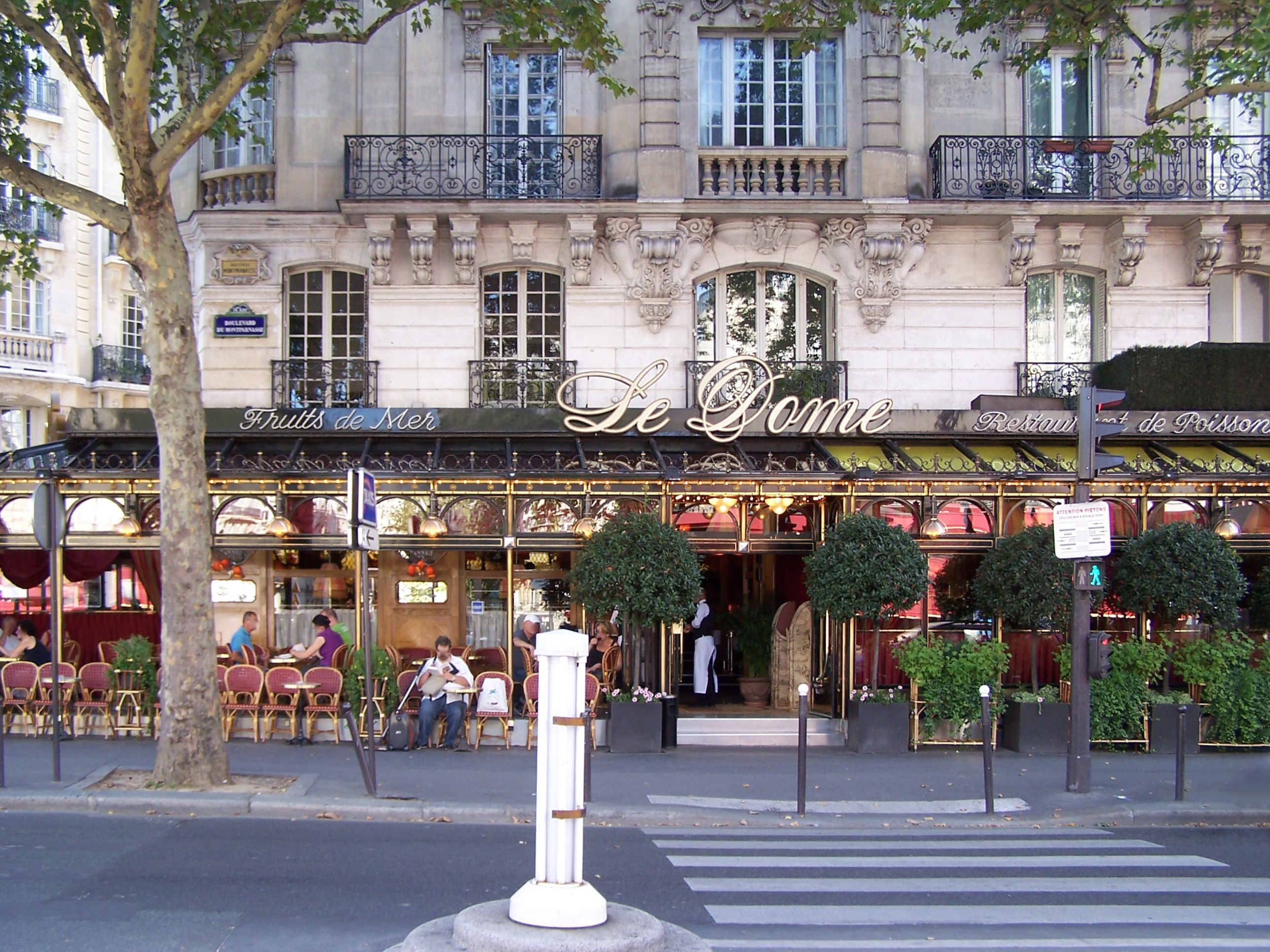
Le Dôme Café

In the 18th century, students recited poems at the foot of an artificial hillock of rock rubble from the Catacombs of Paris. Ironically, they decided to baptise this mound Mount Parnassus, named after the Mount Parnassus celebrated in Ancient Greek literature. In the early 20th century, many Bretons who were driven out of their region by poverty arrived by train at Gare Montparnasse, in the heart of the Montparnasse district, and settled nearby.

Montparnasse became famous in the Roaring Twenties, referred to as les Années Folles (the Crazy Years), and the 1930s as the heart of intellectual and artistic life in Paris. From 1910 to the start of World War II, Paris' artistic circles migrated to Montparnasse as the alternative to the Montmartre district which had been the intellectual breeding ground for the previous generation of artists. The Paris of Charles Baudelaire, Robert de Montesquiou, Zola, Manet, France, Degas, Fauré typically indulged in the Bohemianism cultural refinements of Dandyism.

The cultural scene during the late-1920s for expatriates in Montparnasse and the 6th arrondissement is described in John Glassco's 1970 book Memoirs of Montparnasse. Virtually penniless painters, sculptors, writers, poets and composers came from around the world to thrive in the creative atmosphere of Montparnasse and for the cheap rent at artist communes, such as La Ruche. Living without running water, in damp, unheated Ateliers, many sold their works for a few Francs just to buy food. Jean Cocteau once said that poverty was a luxury in Montparnasse. First promoted by art dealers such as Daniel-Henry Kahnweiler, today works by those artists sell for millions of euros.

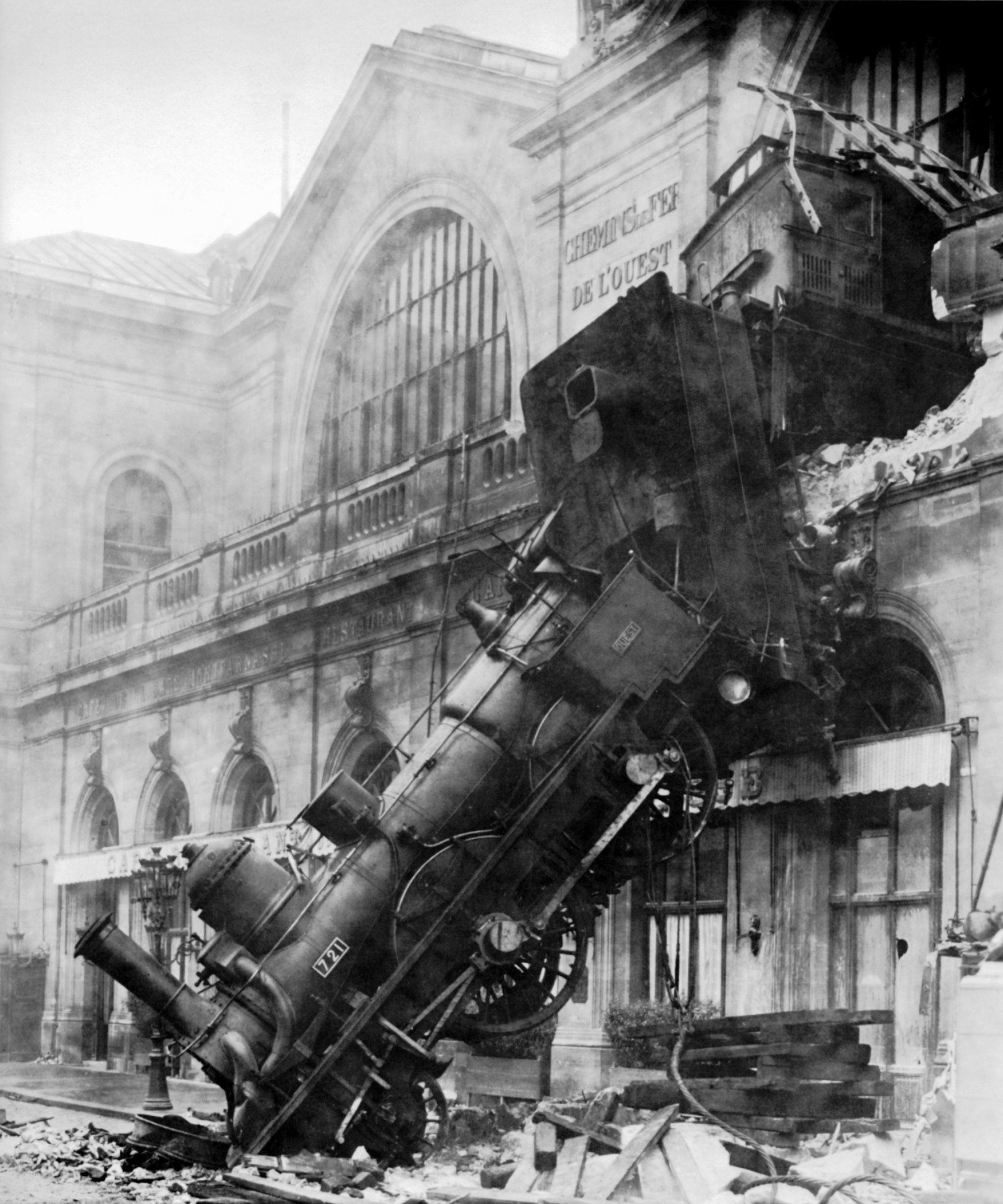
The 1895 Montparnasse derailment at Gare Montparnasse

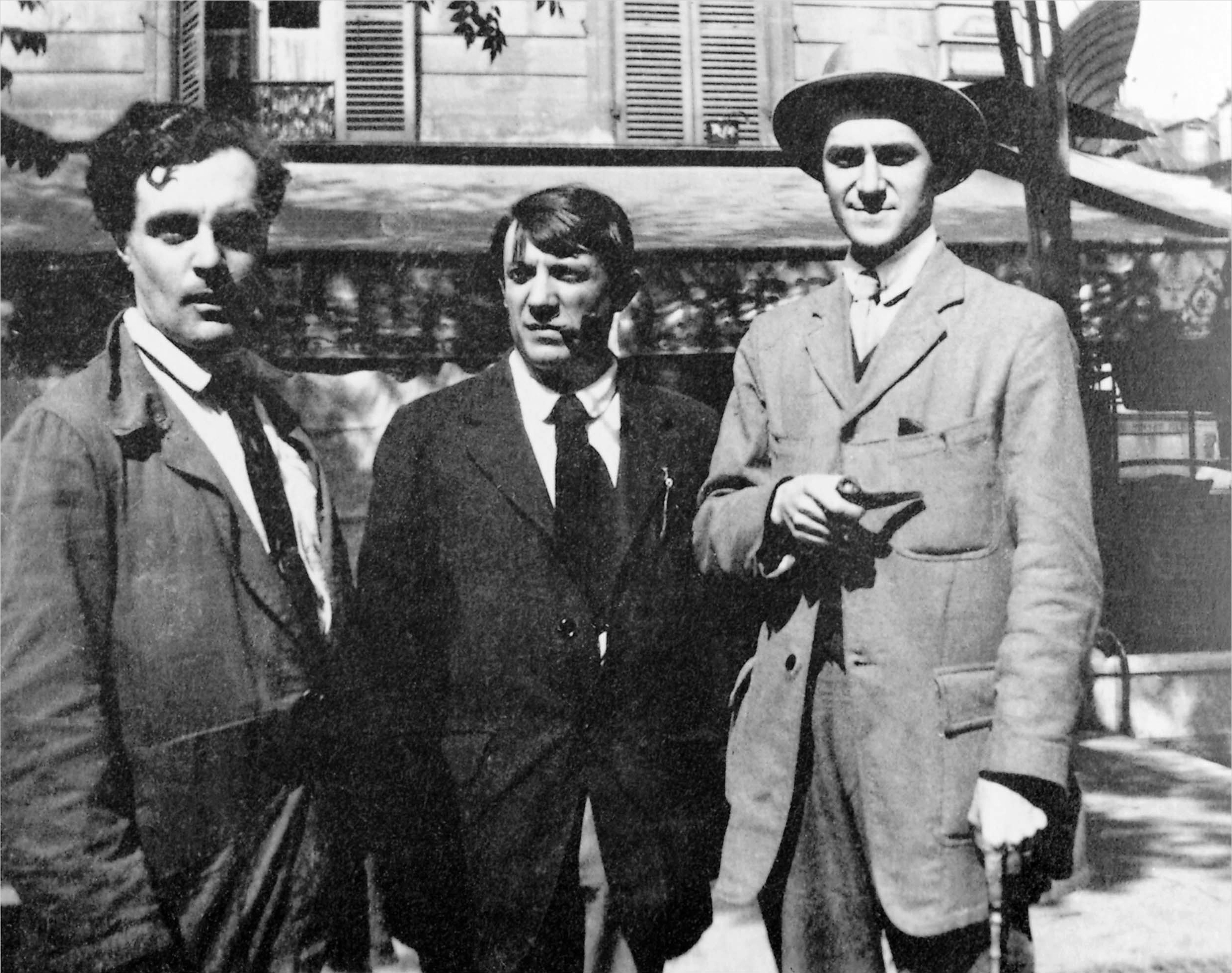
Modigliani, Picasso and Salmon, at La Rotonde, by Cocteau, 1916.

In post-World War I Paris, Montparnasse was a euphoric meeting place for the artistic world. Fernand Léger wrote of that period: "man...relaxes and recaptures his taste for life, his frenzy to dance, to spend money...an explosion of life-force fills the world." They came to Montparnasse from all over the globe - from Europe, including Russia, Hungary and Ukraine, from the United States, Canada, Mexico, Central and South America, and from as far away as Japan. Manuel Ortíz de Zárate, Camilo Mori and others made their way from Chile where the profound innovations in art spawned the formation of the Grupo Montparnasse in Santiago.

A few of the other artists who gathered in Montparnasse were Jacob Macznik, Pablo Picasso, Guillaume Apollinaire, Ossip Zadkine, Julio Gonzalez, Moise Kisling, Jean Cocteau, Erik Satie, Marios Varvoglis, Marc Chagall, Nina Hamnett, Jean Rhys, Fernand Léger, Jacques Lipchitz, Max Jacob, Blaise Cendrars, Chaïm Soutine, James Joyce, Ernest Hemingway, Yitzhak Frenkel Frenel, Michel Kikoine, Pinchus Kremegne, Amedeo Modigliani, Ford Madox Ford, Toño Salazar, Ezra Pound, Max Ernst, Marcel Duchamp, Suzanne Duchamp-Crotti, Henri Rousseau, Constantin Brâncuși, Eva Kotchever, Claude Cahun and Marcel Moore, Paul Fort, Juan Gris, Diego Rivera, Federico Cantú, Angel Zarraga, Marevna, Tsuguharu Foujita, Marie Vassilieff, Léon-Paul Fargue, Alberto Giacometti, René Iché, André Breton, Alfonso Reyes, Pascin, Nils Dardel, Salvador Dalí, Henry Miller, Samuel Beckett, Emil Cioran, Reginald Gray, Endre Ady, Joan Miró, Hilaire Hiler, Magdalena Rădulescu, and, in his declining years, Edgar Degas.

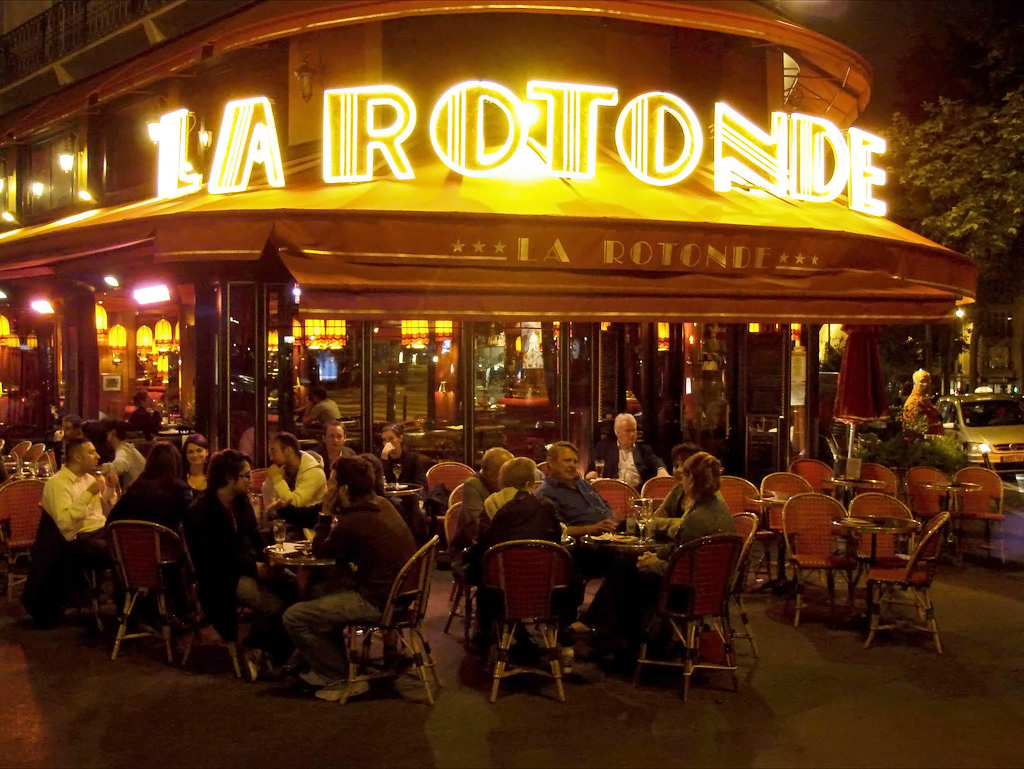
La Rotonde at night, 2007

Montparnasse was a community where creativity was embraced with all its oddities, each new arrival welcomed unreservedly by its existing members. When Tsuguharu Foujita arrived from Japan in 1913 not knowing a soul, he met Chaïm Soutine, Amedeo Modigliani, Jules Pascin and Fernand Léger virtually the same night and within a week became friends with Juan Gris, Pablo Picasso and Henri Matisse. In 1914, when the English painter Nina Hamnett arrived in Montparnasse, on her first evening the smiling man at the next table at Café de la Rotonde graciously introduced himself as "Modigliani, painter and Jew". They became good friends and Hamnett later recounting how she once borrowed a jersey and corduroy trousers from Modigliani, then went to La Rotonde and danced in the street all night.

Between 1921 and 1924, the number of Americans in Paris swelled from 6,000 to 30,000. While most of the artistic community gathered here were struggling to eke out an existence, well-heeled American socialites such as Peggy Guggenheim, and Edith Wharton from New York City, Harry Crosby from Boston and Beatrice Wood from San Francisco were caught in the fever of creativity. Robert McAlmon, and Maria and Eugene Jolas came to Paris and published their literary magazine Transition.

In 1927, Harry Crosby and his wife Caresse established the Black Sun Press in Paris, publishing works by such future luminaries as D. H. Lawrence, Archibald MacLeish, James Joyce, Kay Boyle, Hart Crane, Ernest Hemingway, John Dos Passos, William Faulkner, Dorothy Parker and others. As well, Bill Bird published through his Three Mountains Press until British heiress Nancy Cunard took it over.

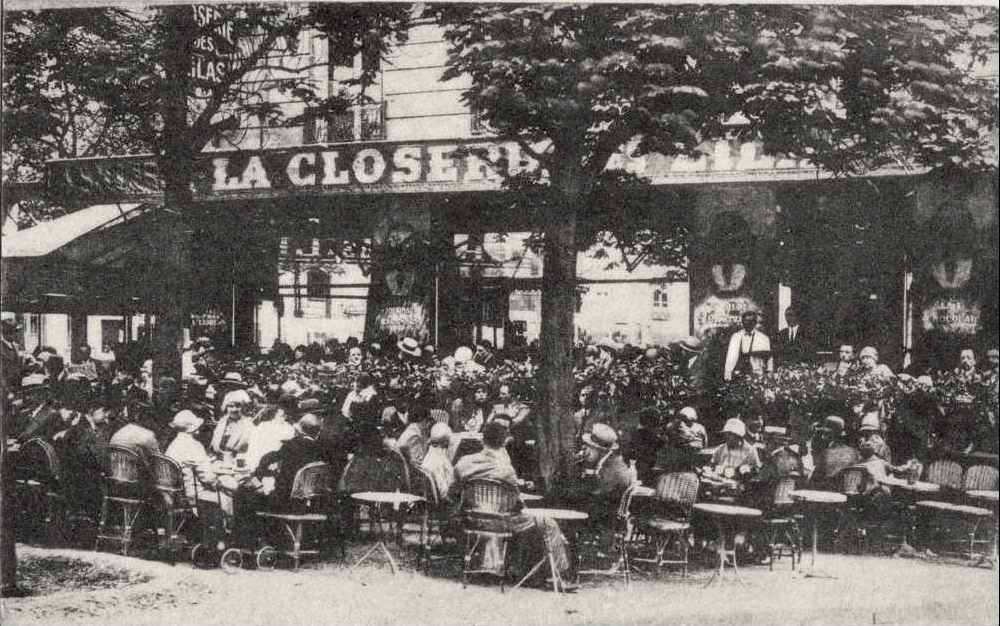
Cafés rented tables to poor artists for hours at a stretch. Several, including La Closerie des Lilas, remain in business today.

The cafés, bistros and bars of Montparnasse were a meeting place where cultural ideas and connections were hatched and mulled over. The cafés at the centre of Montparnasse's night-life were in the Carrefour Vavin, now renamed Place Pablo-Picasso.

In Montparnasse's heyday from 1910 to 1920, the cafés Le Dôme, Closerie des Lilas, La Rotonde, Le Select, and La Coupole—all of which are still in business—were the places where starving artists could occupy a table all evening for a few centimes. If they fell asleep, the waiters were instructed not to wake them. Arguments were common, some fueled by intellect, others by alcohol, and if there were fights, and there often were, the police were never summoned. If you could not pay your bill, people such as La Rotonde's proprietor, Victor Libion, would often accept a drawing, holding it until the artist could pay. As such, there were times when the café's walls were littered with a collection of artworks.

There were many areas where the artists congregated, one of them being near Le Dôme at no. 10 rue Delambre called the Dingo Bar. It was the hang-out of artists and ex-patriate Americans and the place where Canadian writer Morley Callaghan, who came with his friend Ernest Hemingway, both still unpublished writers, met the already-established writer F. Scott Fitzgerald. When Man Ray's friend and Dadaist, Marcel Duchamp, left for New York City, Man Ray set up his first studio at l'Hôtel des Ecoles at no. 15 rue Delambre. This is where his career as a photographer began, and where James Joyce, Gertrude Stein, Kiki of Montparnasse, Jean Cocteau and the others filed in and posed in black and white.

The rue de la Gaité in Montparnasse was the site of many of the great music-hall theatres, in particular the famous "Bobino".

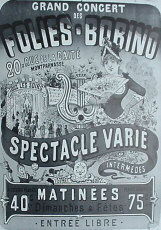
Great artists performed at the Bobino Nightclub.

On their stages, using then-popular single name pseudonyms or one birth name only, Damia, Kiki, Mayol and Georgius, sang and performed to packed houses. And here too, Les Six was formed, creating music based on the ideas of Erik Satie and Jean Cocteau.

The poet Max Jacob said he came to Montparnasse to "sin disgracefully", but Marc Chagall summed it up differently when he explained why he had gone to Montparnasse: "I aspired to see with my own eyes what I had heard of from so far away: this revolution of the eye, this rotation of colours, which spontaneously and astutely merge with one another in a flow of conceived lines. That could not be seen in my town. The sun of Art then shone only on Paris."

While the area attracted people who came to live and work in the creative, bohemian environment, it also became home for political exiles such as Vladimir Lenin, Leon Trotsky, Porfirio Diaz, and Simon Petlyura. But, World War II forced the dispersal of the artistic society, and after the war Montparnasse never regained its splendour. Wealthy socialites like Peggy Guggenheim, an art collector who married artist Max Ernst, lived in the Hôtel Lutetia and frequented the artist studios of Montparnasse, acquiring pieces that would come to be recognized as masterpieces now in the Peggy Guggenheim Museum in Venice, Italy.

The Musée du Montparnasse opened in 1998 at 21 Avenue du Maine and closed in 2015. Although operating with a tiny city grant, the museum was a non-profit operation. The Gallery of Montparnasse was one of the first to introduce abstract expressionism in France in the 1940s, and still holds contemporary art exhibitions today.

== Economy ==
The quarters of the 14th arrondissement, including Montparnasse

The SNCF head office

SNCF, the French rail company, has its head office in Montparnasse near the 14th arrondissement.

Prior to the completion of the current Air France head office in Tremblay-en-France in December 1995, Air France had its headquarters in a tower located next to the Gare Montparnasse railway station in Montparnasse and in the 15th arrondissement; Air France had its headquarters in the tower for about 30 years.

== Education ==
The Vandamme Library (Bibliothèque Vandamme) is located in the neighbourhood.
