= Juan Eduardo David Posada =

Cuban artist

- Born: April 25, 1911; Las Villas, Cuba
- Died: August 8, 1981 (aged 70); Havana
- Occupation: Artist

Juan Eduardo David Posada (born 25 April 1911, Las Villas, Cuba — died 8 August 1981, Havana) was a Cuban artist. He is known best for his drawings, illustrations, caricatures, and paintings.

== Personal life ==
David spent his early years in Spain with his mother and returned to Cuba in 1919. As a young adult, he worked in Cienfuegos, Cuba, and began studying art under Adolfo Meano. He had his first solo exhibition in 1931, displaying thirty caricatures at a photography shop in Santa Clara. The exhibition earned him comparisons to the Salvadoran caricaturist, Toño Salazar.

David had two siblings, Eduardo "Lolo" David and Maria "Lila" David.

At the same time, he formed Ariel, a political group that opposed the regime of President Gerardo Machado, with Carlos Rafael Rodríguez, Raúl Aparicio, and Rafael Viego. His political activities led to several arrests, and eventually to his departure from Santa Clara to Havana, in 1935. While in Havana, he continued to exhibit his work and worked with many magazines, including Isla, Resumen, Mediodía, Social, Patria, Grafos, and Bohemia.

== Individual exhibitions ==
- 1931: Fotografía Santiago, Cienfuegos, Cuba
- 1937: David, Havana
- 1949: Lake Success, New York City
- 1962: David: Dibujos y Caricaturas, Havana
- 1978: 40 Caricaturas y algunas intromisiones. David, Havana
- 1981: Exposición Homenaje. 70 Aniversario. Juan David, Havana
- 2002: Juan David: La realidad trascendida, Museo Nacional de Bellas Artes, Havana

== Collective exhibitions ==
- 1939: XI Salón de Humoristas, Círculo de Bellas Artes, Havana
- 1948: Arte Cubano Contemporáneo," Tegucigalpa, Honduras
- 1968: Pittura Cubana Oggi, Istituto Italo Latinoamericano, Rome, Italy
- 1970: Salón 70, Museo Nacional de Bellas Artes, Havana
- 1994: Nuevas Adquisiciones, Museo Nacional de Bellas Artes, Havana

== Awards ==
- 1939: XI Salón de Humoristas, Círculo de Bellas Artes, Havana
- 1950: First Prize Personal Caricature XVI Salón de Humoristas, Havana
- 1950: Second Prize Dibujo Humorístico, XVI Salón de Humoristas, Havana
- 1955: First Cartoon Prize, XXI Salón de Humoristas, Museo Nacional de Bellas Artes, Havana

== Collections ==
His works can be found in Museo del Humor, San Antonio de los Baños, Havana, and in the Museo Nacional de Bellas Artes, Havana.
