= Moïse Kisling =

French painter

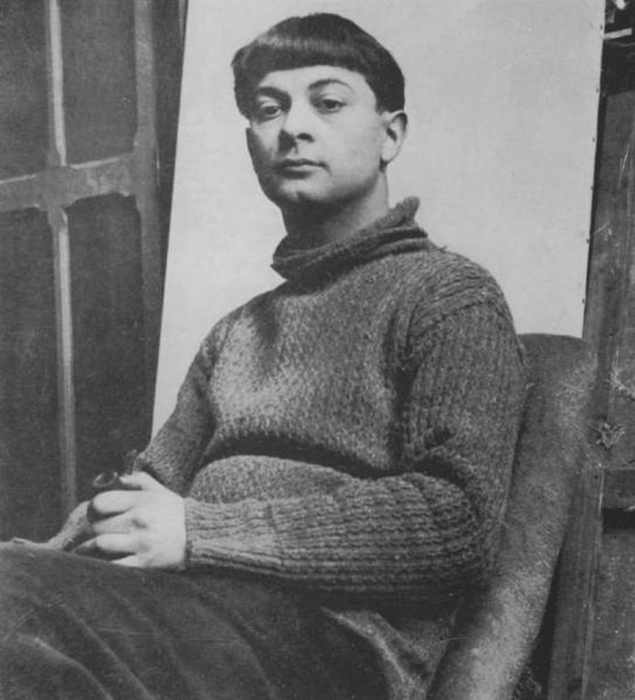
- Moïse Kisling, c.1916
- Born: Mojżesz Kisling; 22 January 1891; Kraków, Grand Duchy of Cracow, Austria-Hungary
- Died: 29 April 1953 (aged 62); Bandol, France
- Monuments: School of Paris
- Other names: Maurice Kisling, Kiki Kisling
- Known for: Painting
- Spouse: Renée Kisling
- Children: 2

Moïse Kisling (born Mojżesz Kisling; 22 January 1891 – 29 April 1953) was a Polish painter. Born in Kraków, then part of Austria-Hungary, to Jewish parents, Kisling studied at the Academy of Fine Arts. He left for Paris in 1910 at the age of 19. After moving to Montmartre, Kisling became a member of the Parisian avant-garde known also as the School of Paris, and developed close professional relationships with painters Amedeo Modigliani and Jules Pascin, among others. Kisling gained recognition for portraying the female form and completed numerous nudes and portraits during his career.

He became a French national in 1924, after serving and being wounded with the French Foreign Legion in World War I. In 1940, despite being 49, Kisling rejoined the army for World War II but moved to the United States following the French Army's surrender and the impending threat to Jews in occupied France. In the U.S., he exhibited his works in New York City and Washington and settled in Southern California. After World War II and the defeat of Nazi Germany, Kisling returned to France. He lived his later years continuing his artwork until his death in 1953, after a brief illness.

His works are held by museums globally, including the Harvard Art Museums, British Museum, and the Metropolitan Museum of Art, among other institutions.

== Early life and education ==
Born in Kraków, Austria-Hungary on 22 January 1891 to Jewish parents. He studied at the Academy of Fine Arts in Krakow with Jozef Pankiewicz. His teachers encouraged the young man to go to Paris, France, considered the international center for artistic creativity in the early 20th century. In 1910, Kisling moved to Montmartre in Paris initially living on Rue des Beaux-Arts, and a few years later to Montparnasse.

At the outbreak of World War I, he volunteered for service in the French Foreign Legion. He was seriously wounded in 1916 in the Battle of the Somme. He married Renée Kisling (née Gros) in 1916, and together they had two sons, Jean (1922) and Guy Kisling (1922). He acquired French nationality by naturalization in 1924.

== Career ==
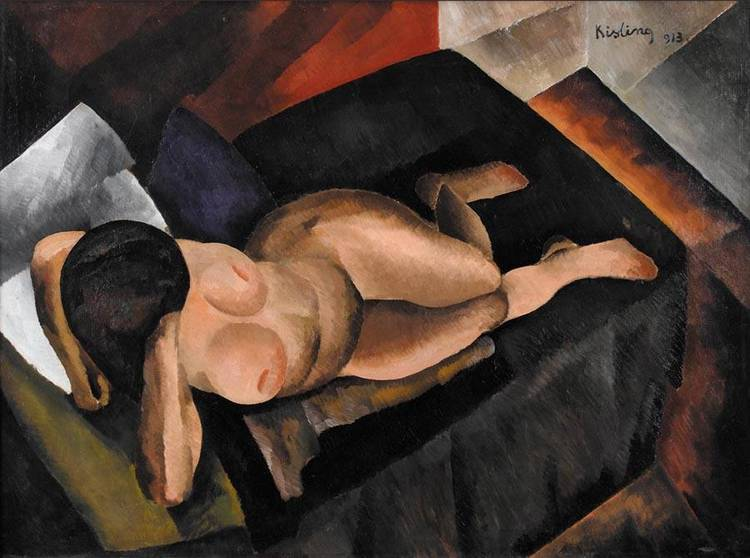
Moïse Kisling, 1913, Nu sur un divan noir, oil on canvas, 97 x 130 cm, published in Montjoie, 1914

Kisling lived and worked in Montparnasse and as part of its renowned artistic community, he joined an émigré community of Americans, British and Eastern European artists. Most of the French kept to themselves, although the artistic community was international. In 1911–1912 he spent nearly a year at Céret, and by 1913, he had moved to Bateau-Lavoir in Montmartre, where he lived briefly.

Eventually around 1913, he took a home residence and art studio on 3 Rue Joseph-Bara in Montparnasse, however he spent a lot of his time in Southern France in the 1920s. Kisling maintained the Paris residence and studio on Rue Joseph-Bara through World War II, and upon his return after the war it had been ransacked. The artists Jules Pascin, Léopold Zborowski, and later Amedeo Modigliani lived in the same building.

He became close friends with many of his contemporaries, including Amedeo Modigliani, who painted a portrait of him in 1916 (in the collection of the Musée d'Art Moderne de la Ville de Paris). His style in painting landscapes is similar to that of Marc Chagall. A master at depicting the female body, his surreal nudes and portraits earned him the widest acclaim.

Kisling volunteered for army service again in 1940 during World War II, although he was 49. When the French Army was discharged after the surrender to the Germans, Kisling emigrated to the United States. He rightly feared for his safety as a Jew in occupied France. He exhibited in New York City and Washington. He settled in Southern California, and had his first art exhibition there in 1942. The Kisling family lived next door to Aldous Huxley and his family in Southern California, where they remained until 1946.

Under the Vichy government, certain critics suggested too many foreigners, especially Jews, were diminishing French traditions. Their comments were part of a rise in anti-Semitism during the German occupation, resulting in French cooperation in the deportation and deaths of tens of thousands of foreign and French Jews in concentration camps. Kisling returned to France after the war and defeat of Germany.

== Death and legacy ==
Moïse Kisling died at his house in Bandol, Var, Provence-Alpes-Côte d'Azur, France on 29 April 1953. He had been ill with stomach issues for ten days, prior to his death. His work is in various public museum collections, including at the Harvard Art Museums, British Museum, the Metropolitan Museum of Art, Tokyo Fuji Art Museum, the Israel Museum, Ikeda 20 Seiki Museum, amongst others.

== Gallery ==
Works

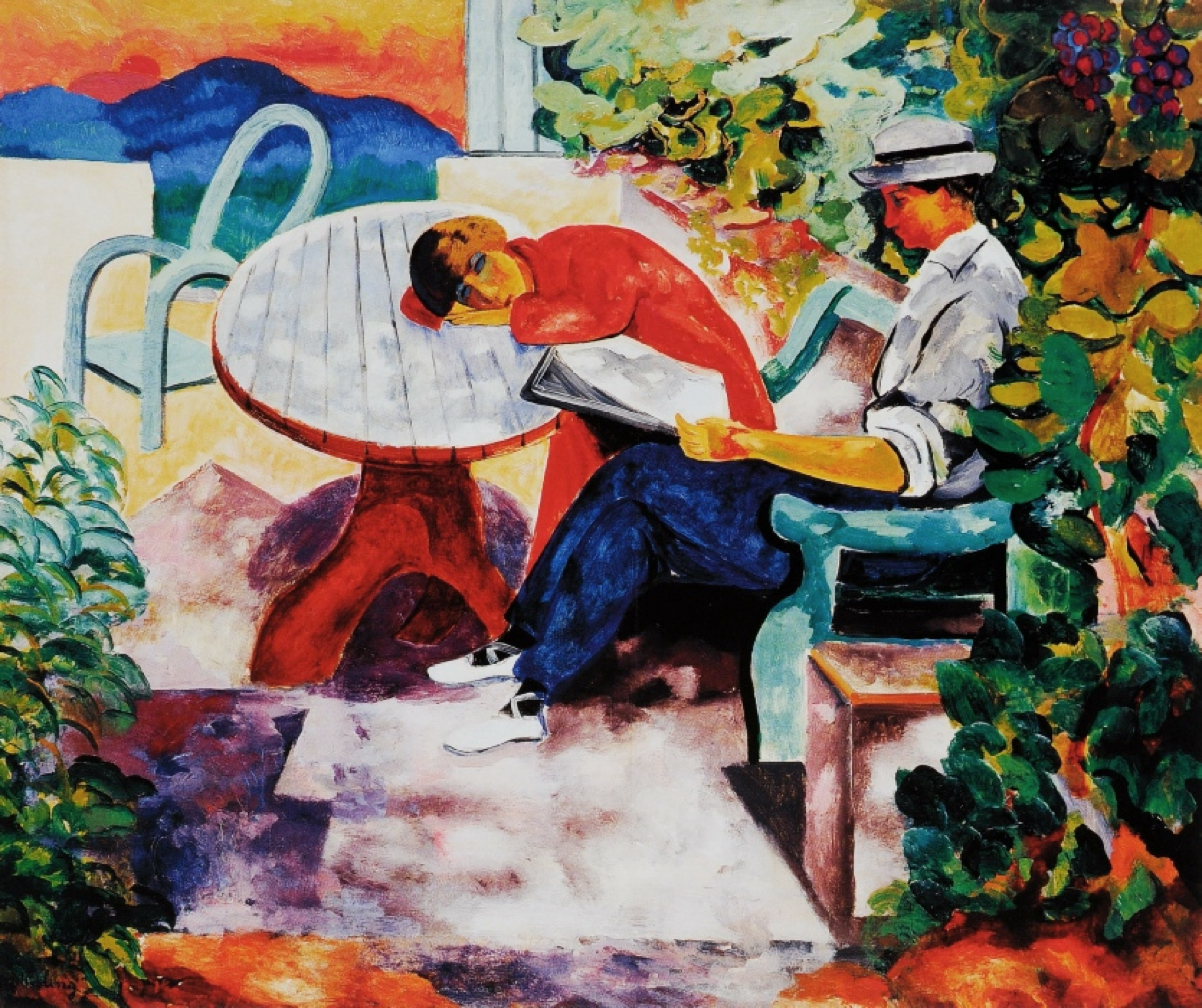
Moïse Kisling, 1916, La Sieste à Saint-Tropez (Kisling with Renée)

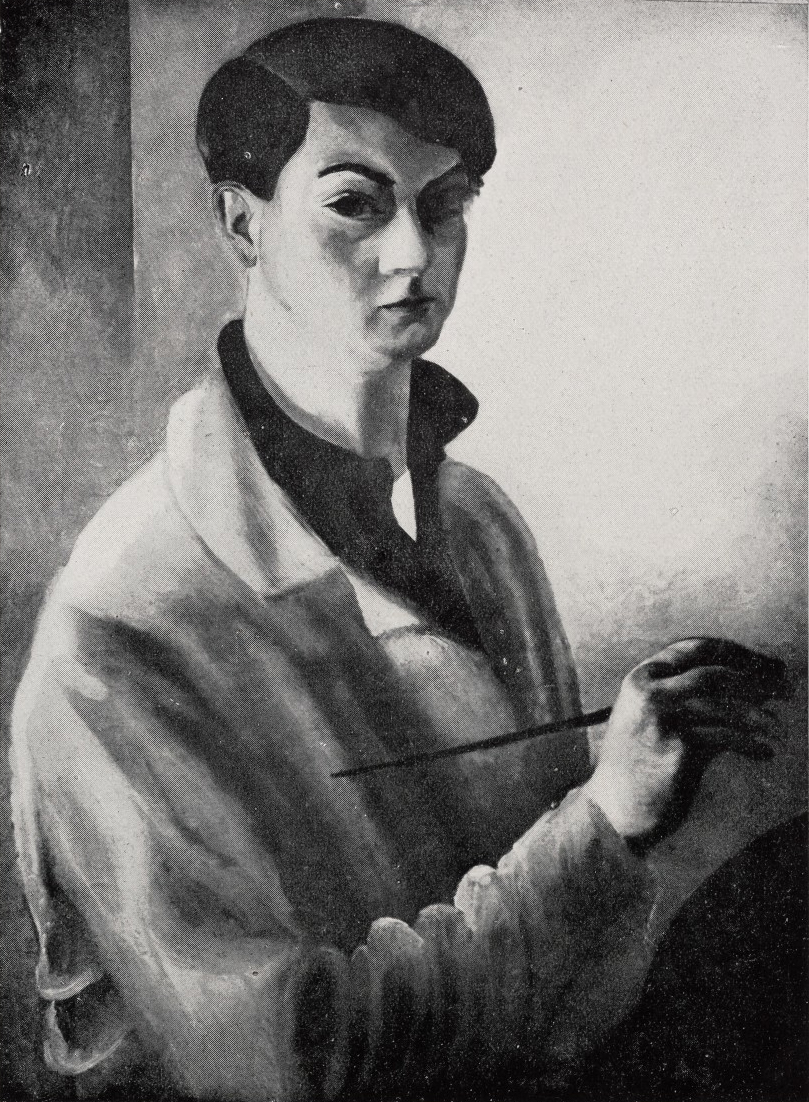
Moïse Kisling, Portrait du peintre (Autoportrait), oil on canvas, 81.3 x 60.3 cm, private collection. Published in Action: Cahiers Individualistes de Philosophie et d'art, July 1920

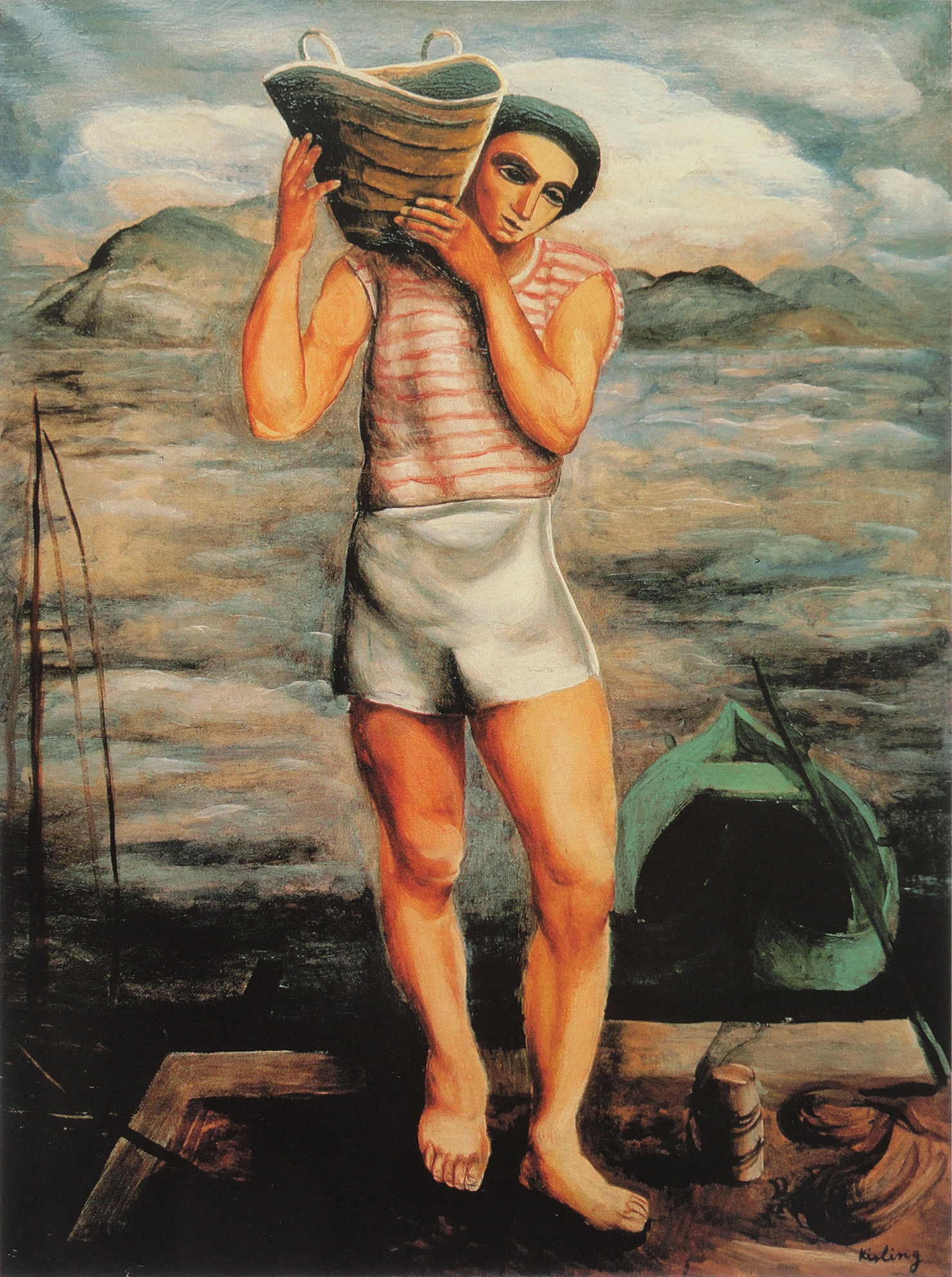
Moïse Kisling, c.1920, Le pêcheur (The Fisherman), oil on canvas, 82 x 61.7 cm, private collection

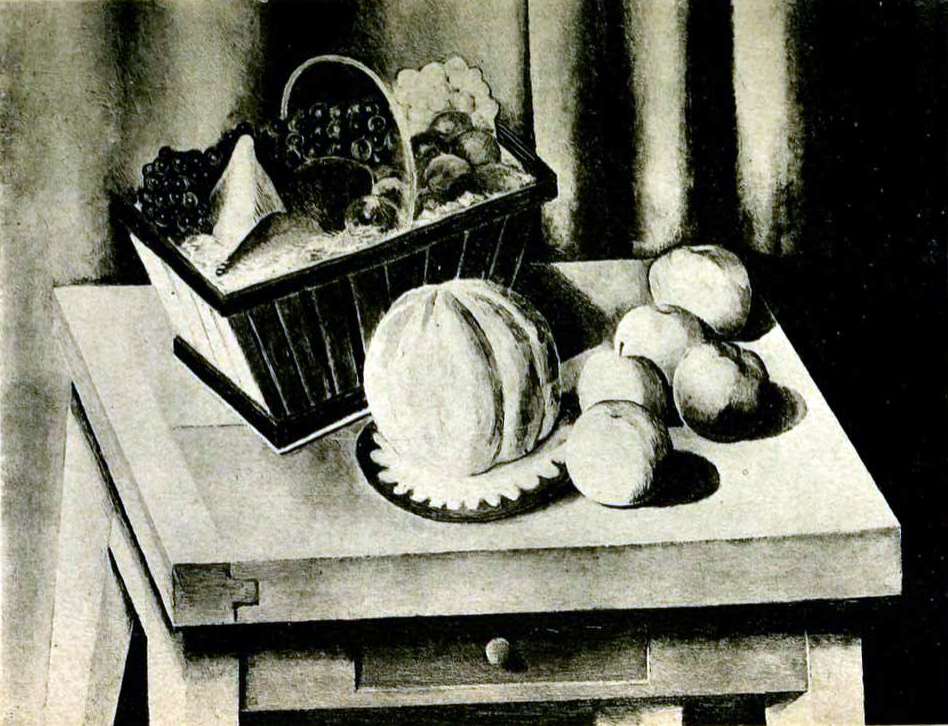
Moïse Kisling, Nature morte, before 1920. Reproduced in André Salmon, L'Art Vivant, Artistes d'hier et d'aujourd'hui, 1920 (black and white photograph)

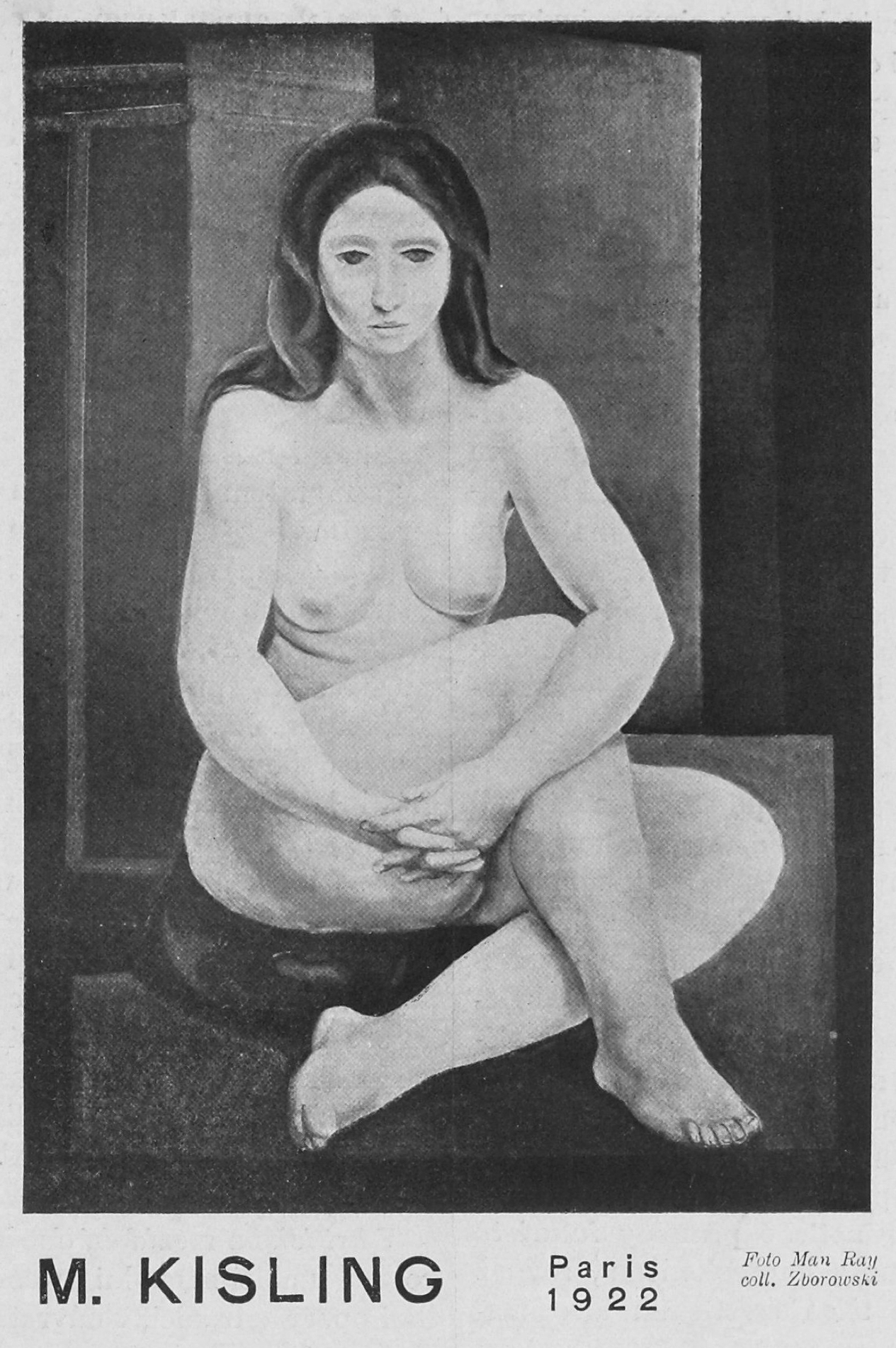
Moïse Kisling, 1921, Nu assis, oil on canvas, private collection

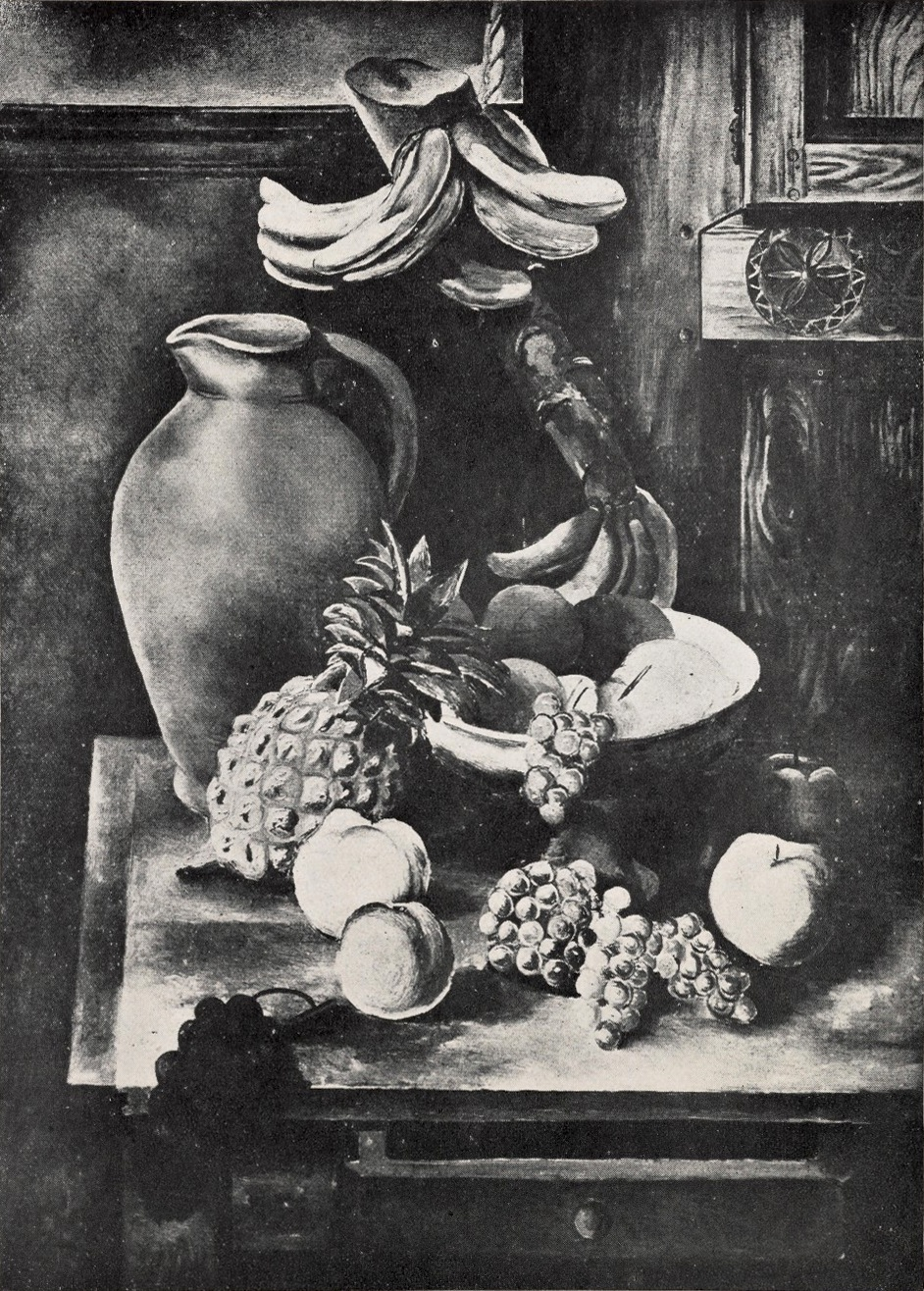
Moïse Kisling, Nature morte (Still Life), published in Action, Cahiers Individualistes De Philosophie Et D'art, August 1921

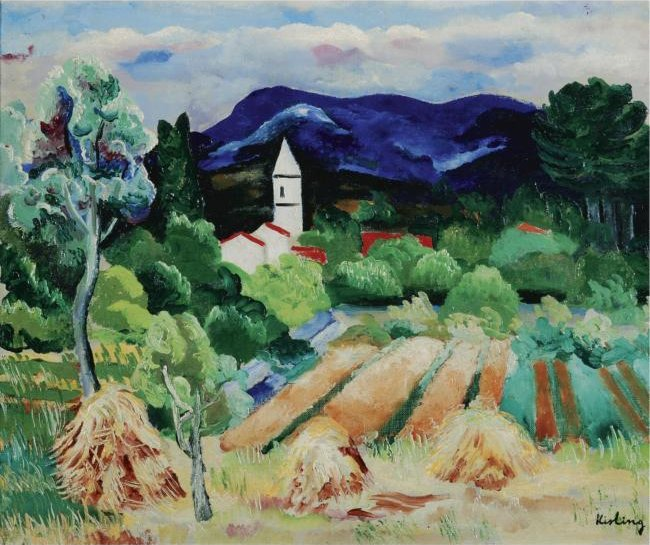
Moïse Kisling, c.1919, Paysage de Provence, oil on canvas
Depictions of the artist

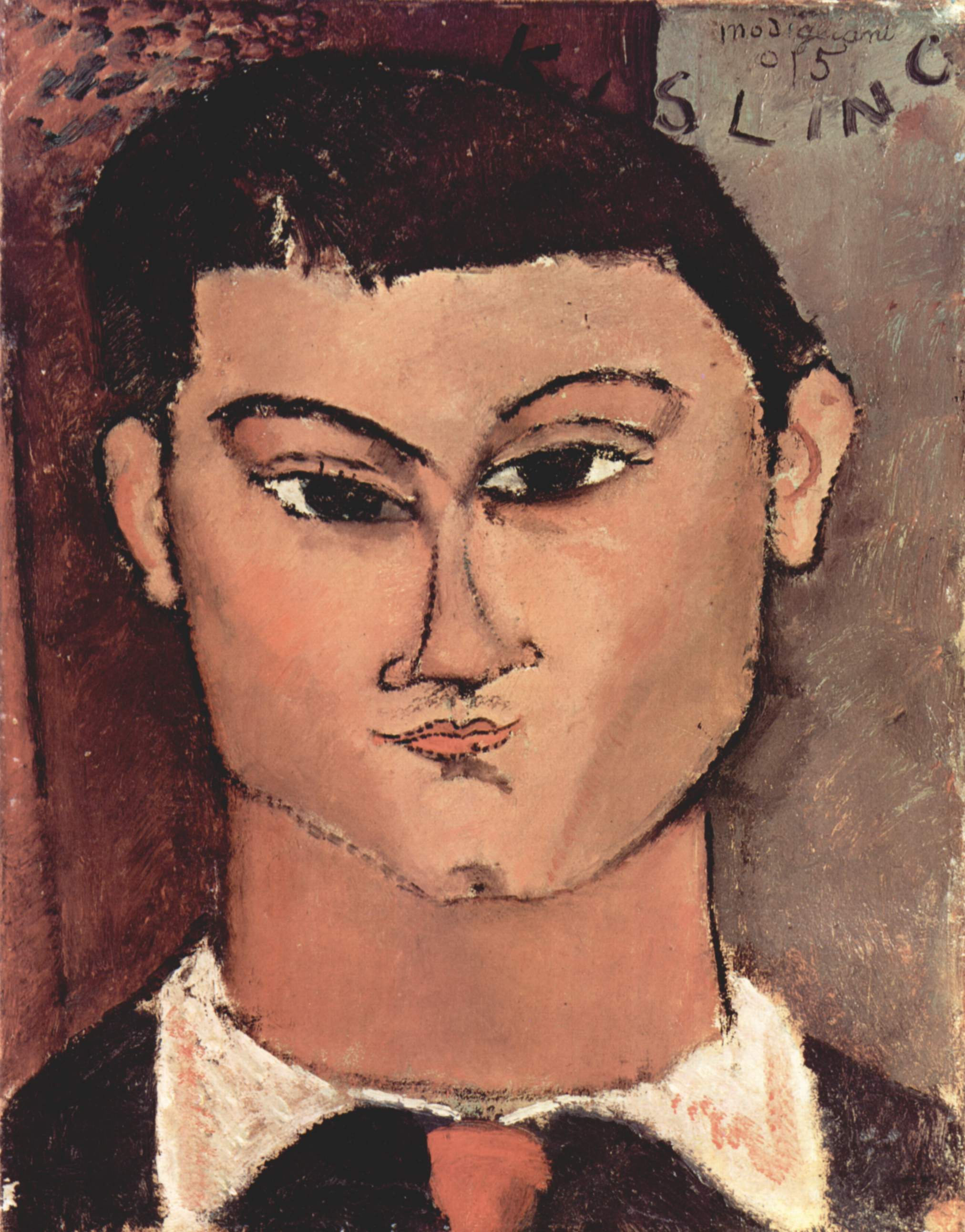
Portrait of Kisling by Amedeo Modigliani

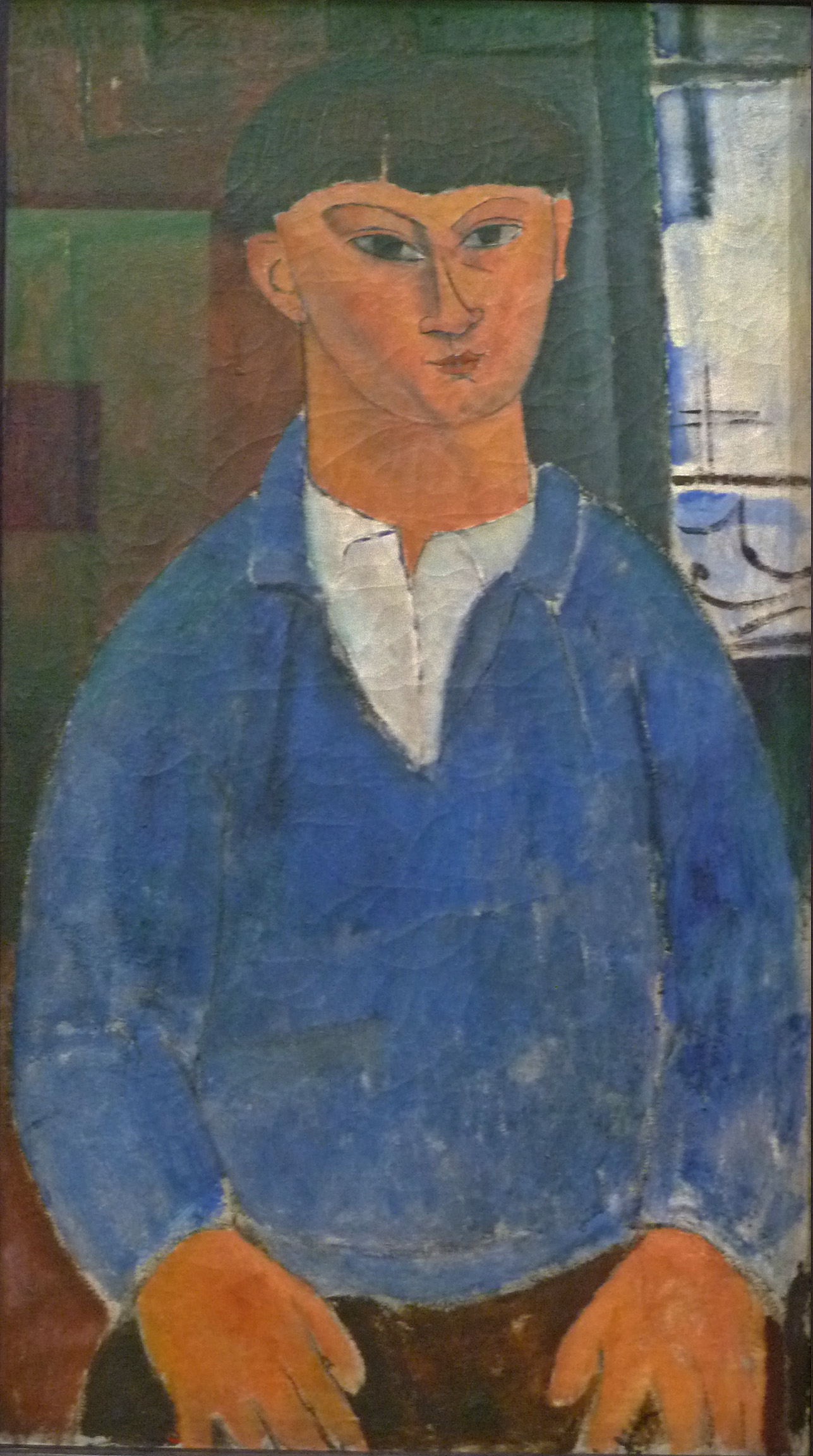
Amedeo Modigliani, Portrait of Moïse Kisling, 1918. Lille Métropole Museum of Modern, Contemporary and Outsider Art, Villeneuve d'Ascq, France

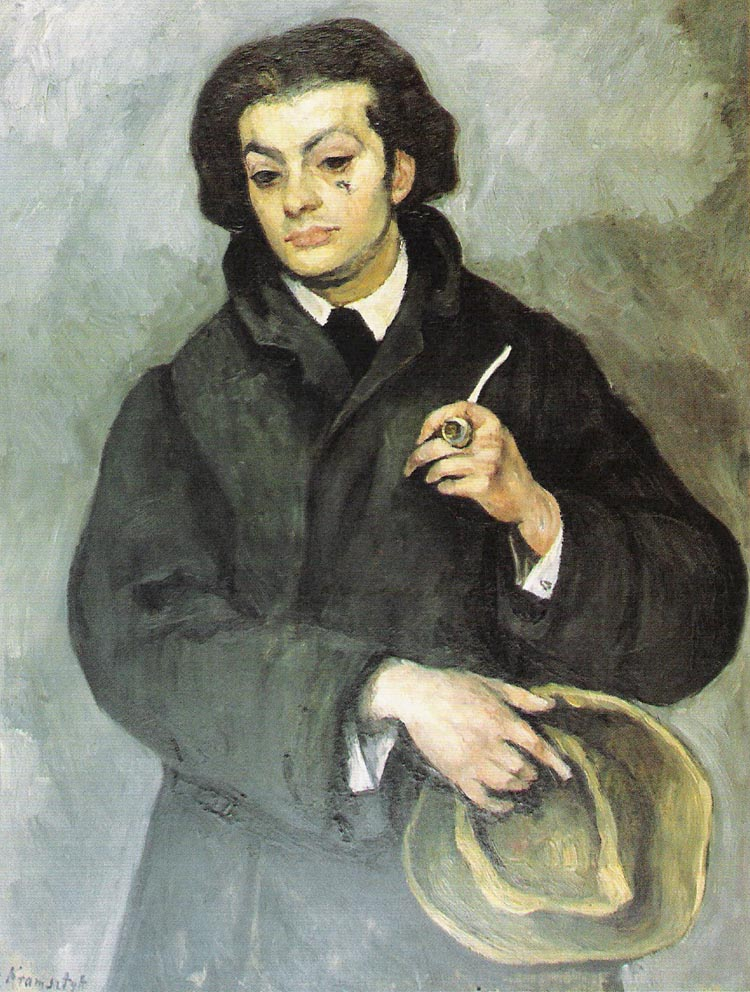
Portrait of Moïse Kisling by Roman Kramsztyk, 1913

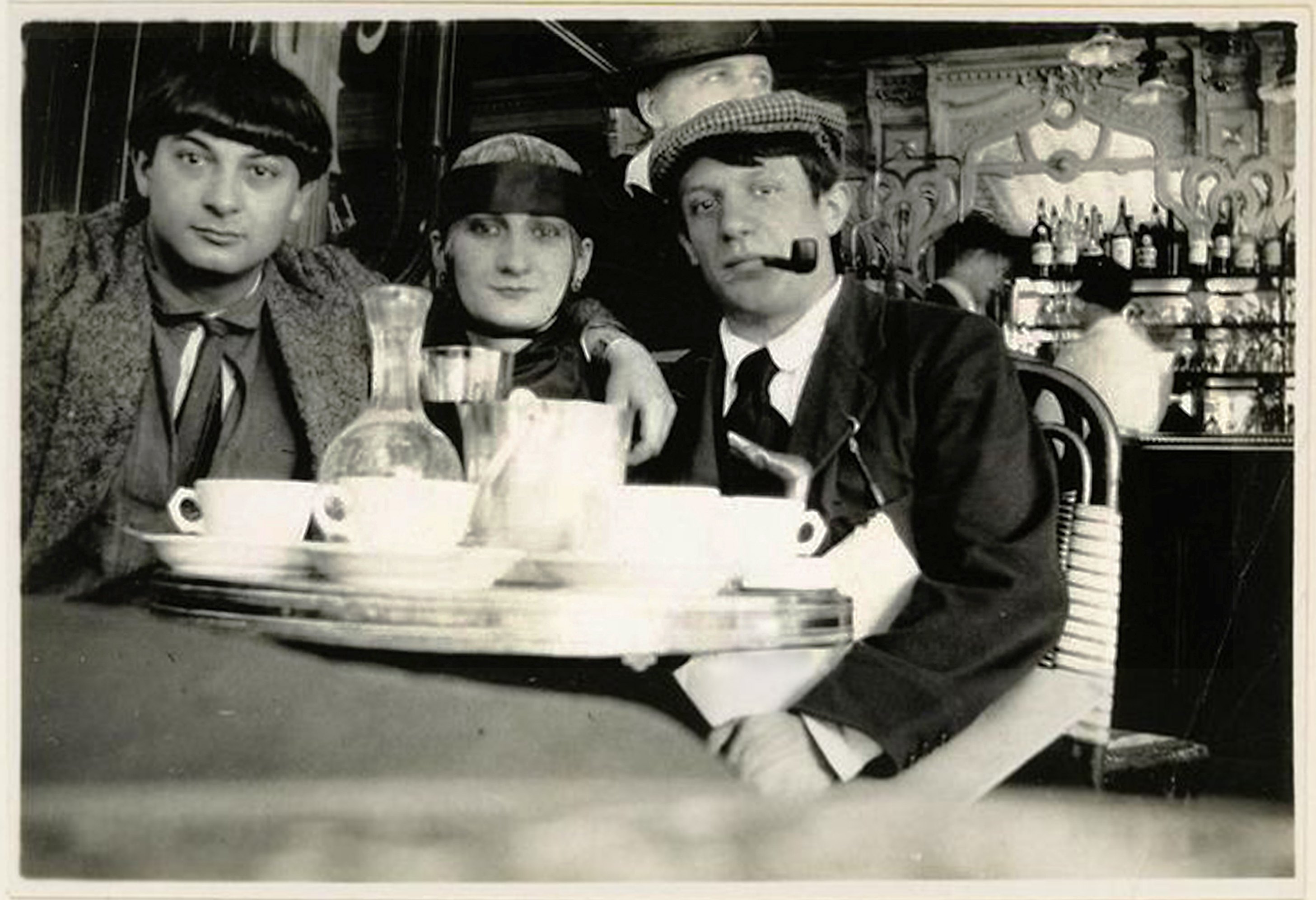
Moïse Kisling with fashion model Paquerette and Pablo Picasso, photographed by Jean Cocteau in 1916 at Café de la Rotonde, 105 Boulevard du Montparnasse, August 1916

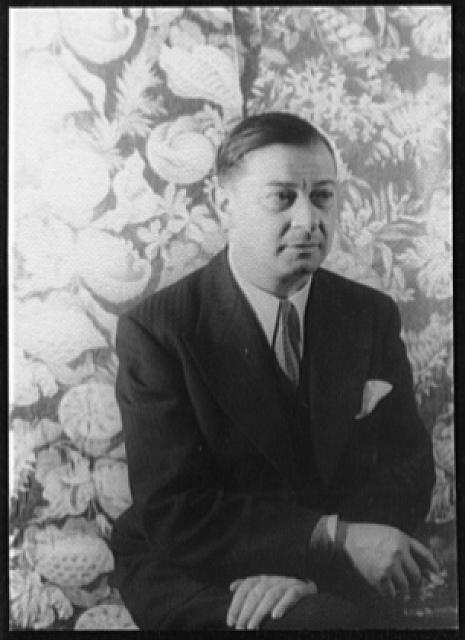
Moïse Kisling, 1941

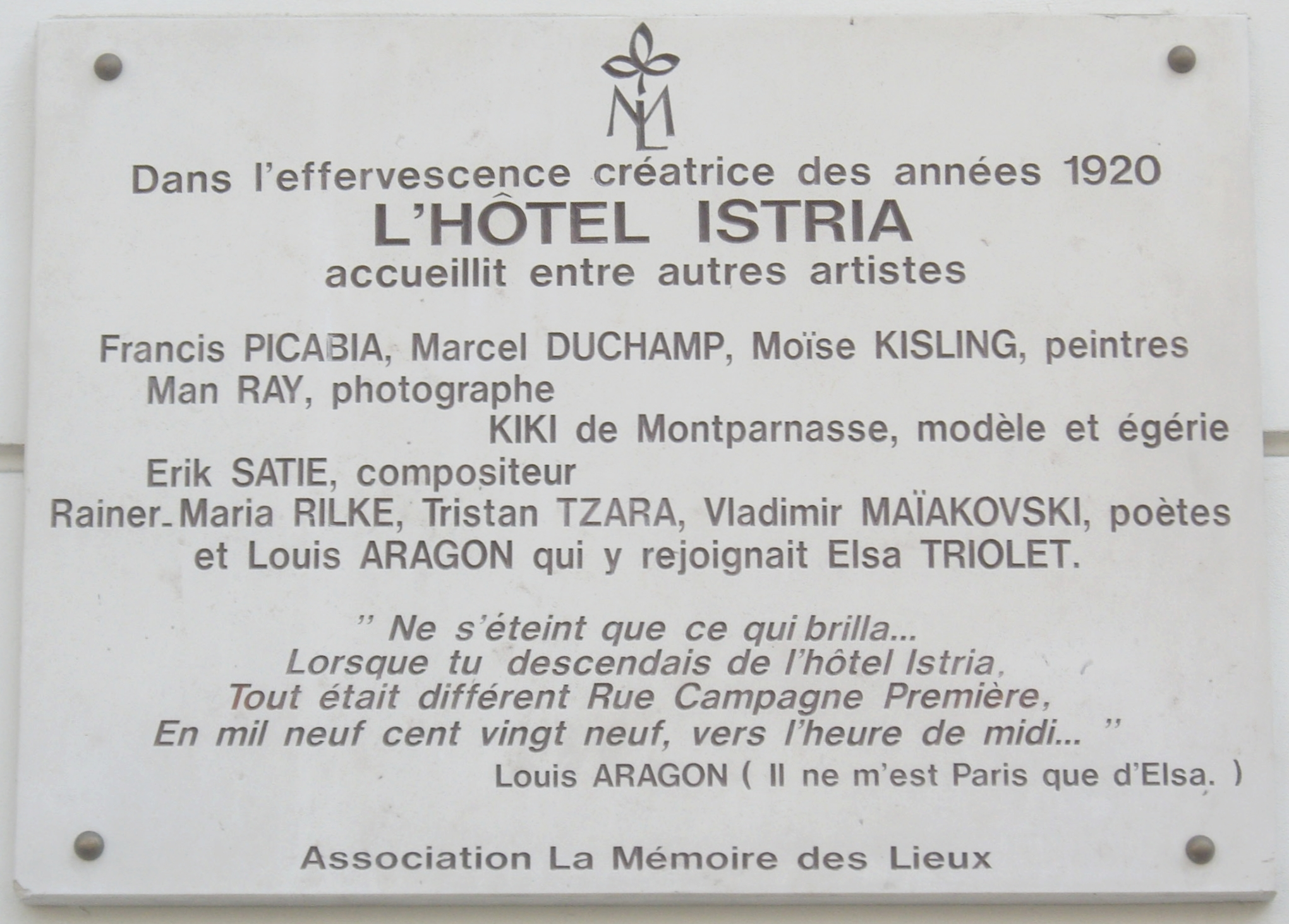
Commemorative plaque, 29 rue Campagne-Première, Paris, 75014

== Selected exhibitions ==
- Galerie Jean Pascaud (Paris), with Jacques Henri Lartigue, Paul Colin, Marie Laurencin, Henri Lebasque, and Marcel Roche from November 14 to 29, 1934.
- "The Last Works of Kisling," Museum of Old Marseille (Marseille), from September 13 to 30, 1953.
- "Kisling, Major Figure of the School of Paris," Tokyo Metropolitan Teien Art Museum (Tokyo), from April 20 to July 7, 2019
