= La Coupole (Paris) =

Art deco brasserie in Montparnasse

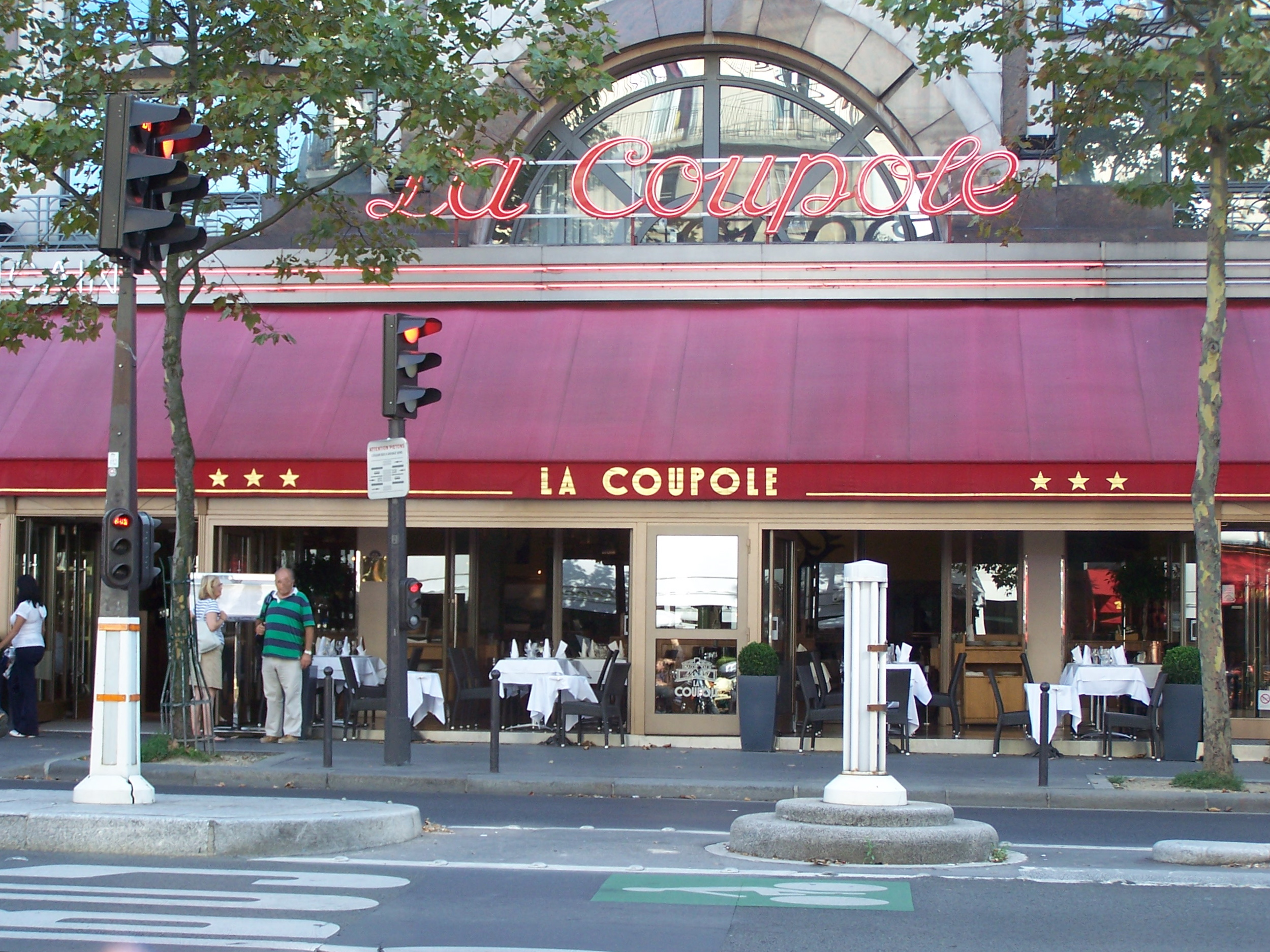
- Interactive map of La Coupole

Restaurant information
- Location: 102, boulevard du Montparnasse, Paris, Paris, France
- Coordinates: 48.842270°N 2.327943°E

La Coupole is a famous brasserie in Montparnasse in Paris. It was opened on December 20, 1927 by Ernest Fraux and René Lafon during the Roaring Twenties when Montparnasse housed a large artistic and literary community –expatriates and members of the Lost Generation. They decorated the place in the contemporary art deco style. Artists of the School of Paris and intellectuals frequented the brasserie in the interwar period.

The La Coupole Dance Hall, in the basement, opened on December 24, 1928 and is where musicians performed. Filiberto Rico's Rico's Créole Band (1910-1976) was the main orchestra of La Coupole, playing rumba, bolero, guaracha, samba and other baião until the 1960s.

Among the first artists and intellectuals to adopt La Coupole as their regular haunt were Jean Cocteau, Alberto Giacometti, Joséphine Baker, Man Ray, Georges Braque and Brassaï. Louis Aragon and Elsa Triolet met there in 1928. In the 1930s, aficionados of La Coupole were Pablo Picasso, Simone de Beauvoir and Jean-Paul Sartre, Sonia Delaunay, André Malraux, Jacques Prévert, Marc Chagall, Édith Piaf among many others. In the 1940s and 1950s La Coupole was frequented by Ernest Hemingway, Henry Miller, Marlene Dietrich, and Ava Gardner. After the Second World War, Yves Klein dined there almost every evening and held judo sessions on the terrace.

The bronze cast sculpture which now stands prominently in the middle of the restaurant is called La Terre [Earth] by the sculptor Louis Derbré. It was cast at the artist's foundry and unveiled in 1993. The original revolving version of La Terre (1972) is in Ikebukuro Square in Tokyo, and a replica in resin has been set up in the place des Reflets at La Défense, on the outskirts of Paris. A description of the sculpture at the restaurant may be found in the memoir Footloose in France by John Adamson and Clive Jackson. Adamson records also meeting the sculptor at the Galerie Genot when he was working on the reduced-size versions of La Terre.

== See also ==
- Le Select
- Le Dome Cafe
- Roaring Twenties
- Montparnasse
