= Boulevard du Montparnasse =

Two-way boulevard in Montparnasse in Paris, France

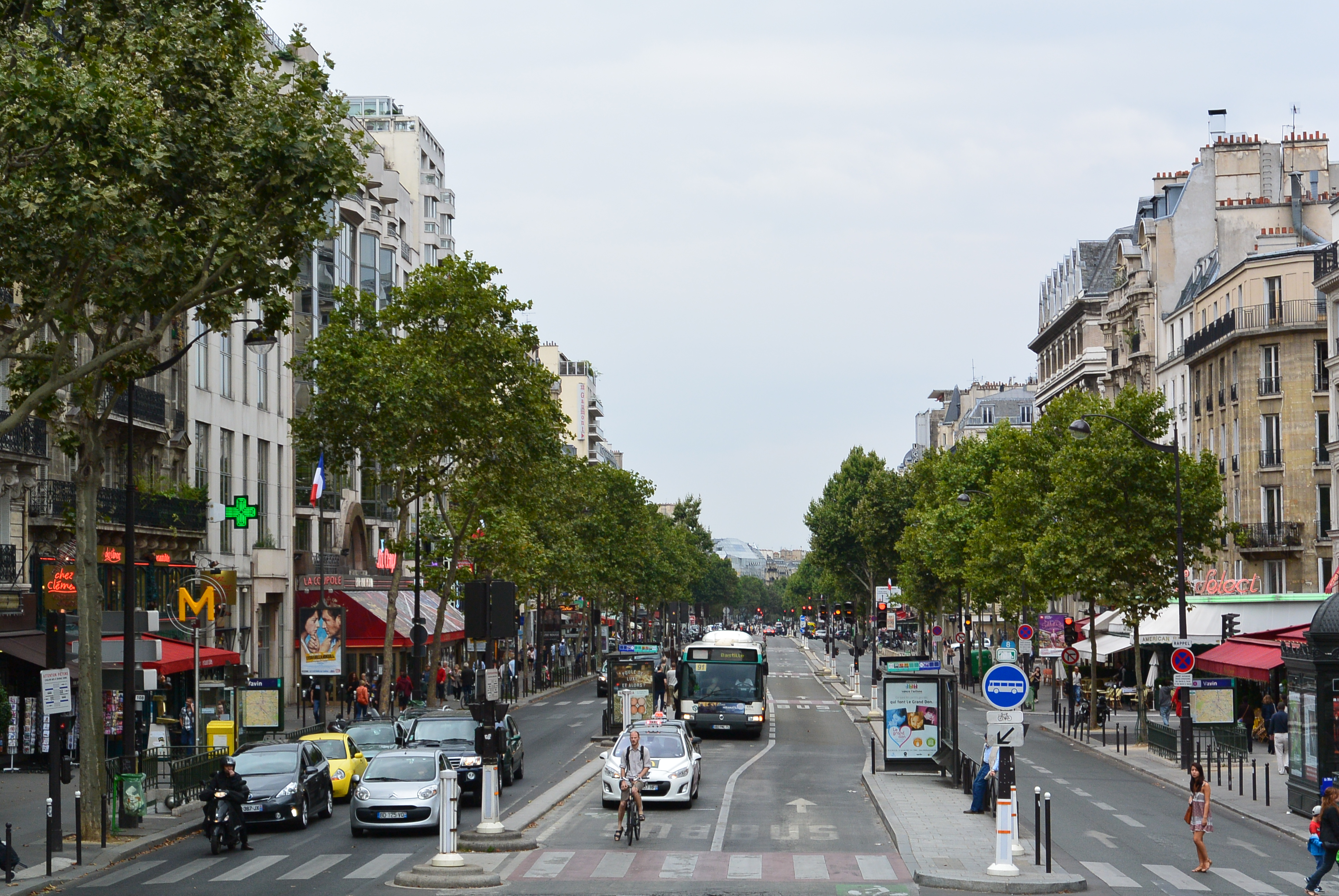
- Boulevard Montparnasse

- Location within Paris
- Length: 1,632 m (5,354 ft)
- Width: 39 m (128 ft)
- Arrondissement: 6th, 14th, 15th
- Quarter: Notre-Dame des Champs . Necker . Montparnasse .
- Coordinates: 48°50′34″N 2°19′38″E
- From: Place Léon-Paul Fargue
- To: Place Camille Jullian

Construction
- Completion: Lettres patentes du 9 août 1760

The Boulevard du Montparnasse (French pronunciation: [bulvaʁ dy mɔ̃paʁnas]) is a two-way boulevard in Montparnasse, in the 6th, 14th and 15th arrondissements of Paris.

== Situation ==
The boulevard runs south-eastward from the Place Léon-Paul Fargue to the Port-Royal (Place Camille Jullian) and is 1.7 km in length. The Tour Montparnasse and place du 18 juin 1940 are located along it.

Located near the Metro stations: Duroc, Vavin, Port-Royal and Montparnasse – Bienvenüe.

== History ==
During the 1930s, when American writer Henry Miller was penniless in Paris, he would often sleep on a bench outside the Closerie des Lilas, a brasserie located at 171 Boulevard du Montparnasse.

== See also ==
- Cimetière du Montparnasse
- Gare Montparnasse
