= Toño Salazar =

Salvadoran artist, diplomat (1897–1986)

Antonio "Toño" Salazar (June 1897 – December 1986) was a Salvadoran caricaturist, illustrator and diplomat. Born in Santa Tecla, in 1920 he went to study in Mexico on an art scholarship then in 1922 traveled to France to join the throng of artists and writers from around the world who were living, working, and learning in the Montparnasse Quarter of Paris.

Salazar became friends with Mexican writer/diplomat José María González de Mendoza and the Guatemalan writer Luis Cardoza y Aragón. He did the illustrations for Aragón's 1923 book Luna Park. A leftist, in the 1930s he worked as a propagandist for the Republican cause in Spain. During World War II he went to Buenos Aires where he was employed as an illustrator and caricaturist at the socialist weekly magazine Argentina Libre. Salazar published satires of Adolf Hitler, General Franco, Benito Mussolini and Argentina's rising star, Juan Perón. The right-wing government closed Argentina Libre and Salazar was forced to leave the country. He traveled to Montevideo, Uruguay where he remained until 1949 when he was allowed back into Buenos Aires for a time.

In the early 1950s, the new El Salvador government of President Óscar Osorio gave Toño Salazar a diplomatic appointment in Montevideo. He spent twenty years serving in various consulate offices in Uruguay, France, Italy, and Israel. In 1978, his country awarded him the Order of José Matías Delgado and the Premio Nacional de Cultura.

Toño Salazar died in 1986 in San Salvador from Parkinson's disease. A significant collection of his work is at the El Salvador Museum of Art in San Salvador who held a major exhibition of his works in 2005 and who named a reception hall in his honor.

Toño Salazar's work was a strong influence on the Cuban caricaturist Juan David.
