= Closerie des Lilas =

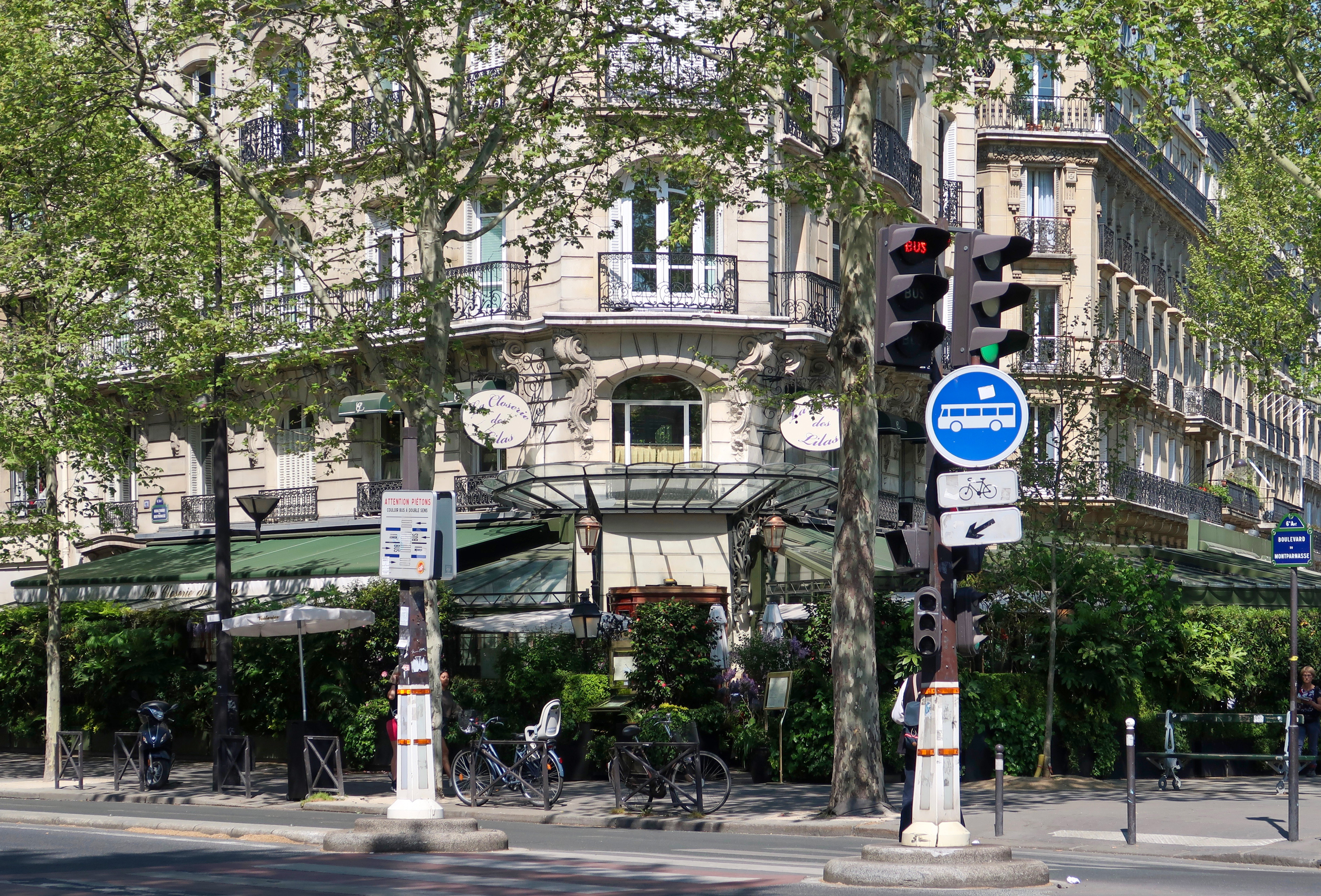

Restaurant information
- Established: 1847
- Location: 171, Boulevard du Montparnasse, Paris, France
- Coordinates: 48°50′24″N 2°20′10″E
- Website: http://www.closeriedeslilas.fr/

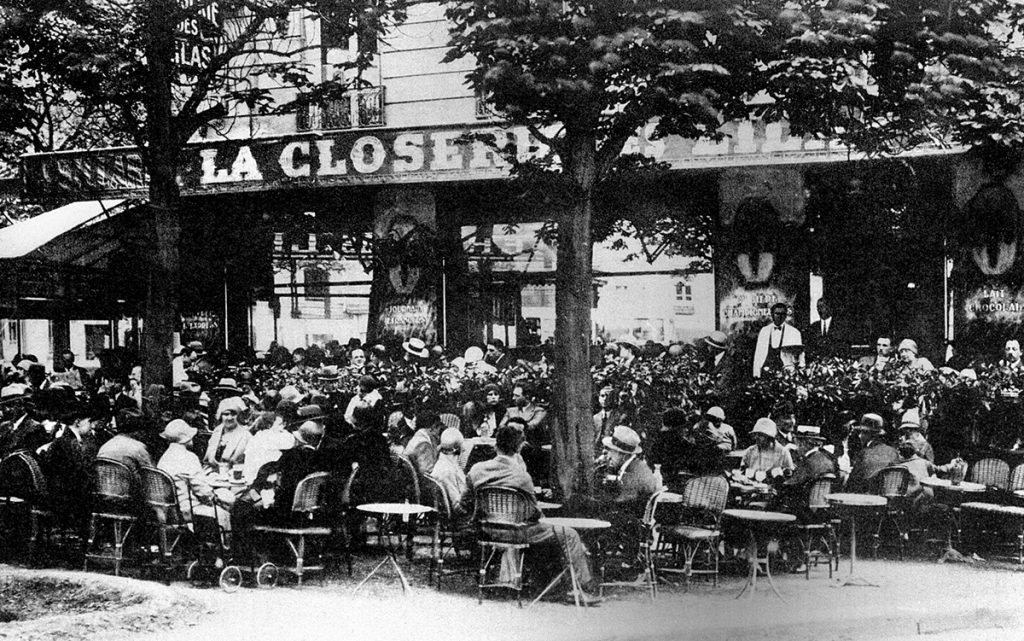
La Closerie des Lilas in the mid-19th century

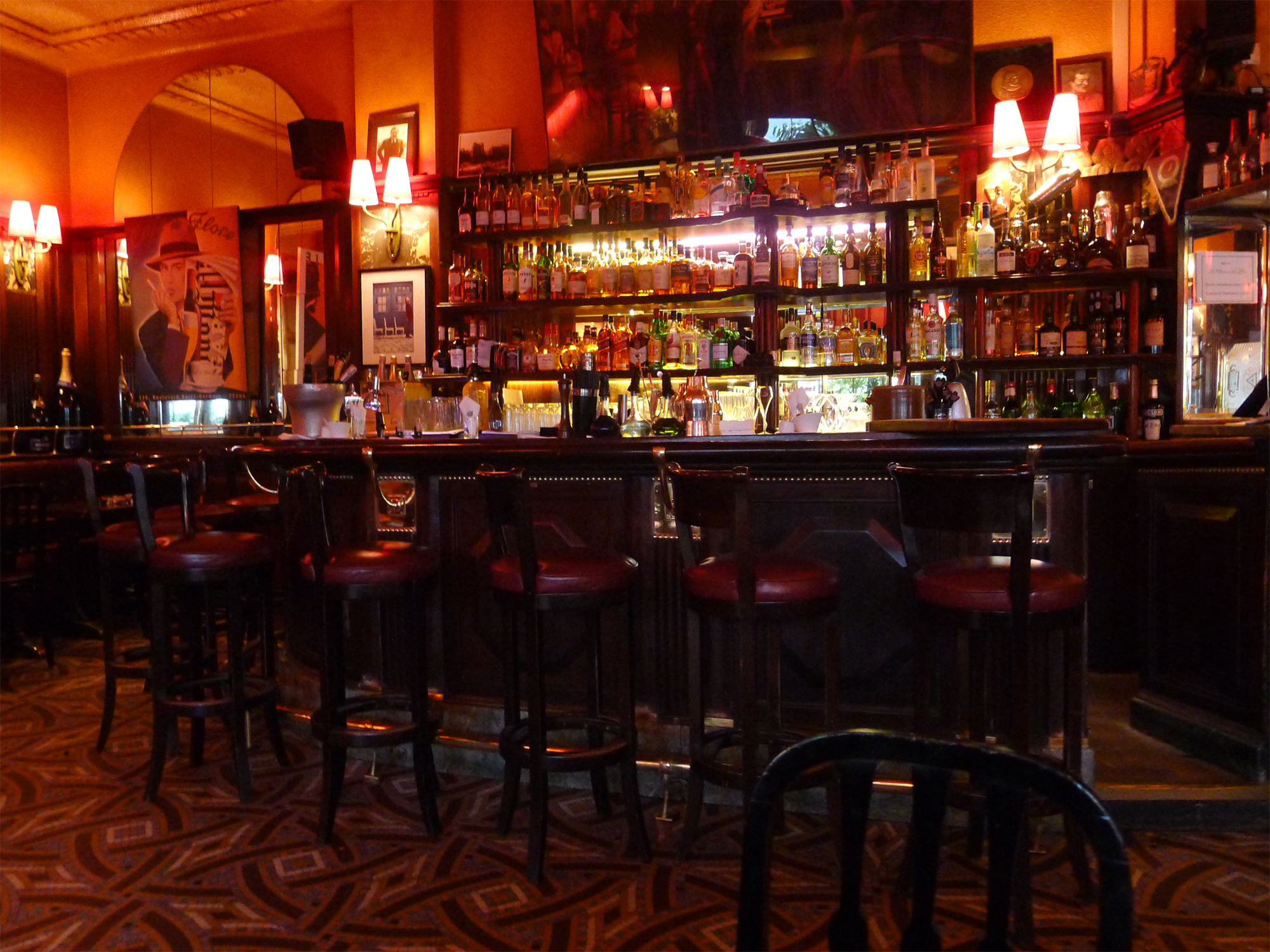
La Closerie des Lilas's bar

The Closerie des Lilas (French pronunciation: [klozʁi de lila]) is a famous Parisian restaurant (or brasserie) located on the Boulevard du Montparnasse in the 6th arrondissement of Paris. It was opened in 1847 by François Bullier and was a simple brasserie at the beginning. Initially, it was named after a theatre piece called La Closerie des Genets by Frédéric Soulié. It progressively evolved into the Closerie des Lilas because its owner, Bullier, used to plant lilac flowers.

Many artists and intellectuals adopted the habit to spend time there, including Émile Zola, Paul Cézanne, Giuseppe Ungaretti, Oscar Wilde, Charles Baudelaire, James Joyce, Paul Verlaine, André Gide, Pablo Picasso, Amedeo Modigliani, Jean-Paul Sartre, Samuel Beckett, Scott Fitzgerald, Ezra Pound, Sylvia Beach, Gertrude Stein, Alice B. Toklas and Ernest Hemingway. The Closerie des Lilas owes much of its artistic popularity to Hemingway, who would write short stories and articles for the Toronto Star there, but Picasso was introduced to the Closerie des Lilas much earlier by Guillaume Apollinaire in 1905.

Between the two world wars, the restaurant modernised, adopted an Art Deco style, and became more expensive.

The literary tradition of the café is upheld by the Prix de la Closerie des Lilas, an annual prize (since 2007) awarded to contemporary women writers who write in the French language.

== See also ==
- Brasserie
- Restaurant
- Bouillon Chartier
- List of restaurants in Paris
