= Kiki's Memoirs =

1929 autobiography by Alice Prin

- First English Edition
- Author: Alice Prin
- Translator: Samuel Putnam
- Language: French
- Genre: Autobiography
- Publication date: 1929

Kiki's Memoirs is a 1929 autobiography by Alice Prin (October 2, 1901 – April 29, 1953), known as Kiki de Montparnasse; a model, artist, and actress working in Montparnasse, Paris in the first half of the twentieth century.

Translated from the French by Samuel Putnam, and published in Manhattan by Black Manikin Press, her memoirs are a lively account of the bohemian lifestyle typical among the artists in Paris during the 1920s, with an introduction provided by Ernest Hemingway. She tells of her encounters with Man Ray, Tsuguharu Foujita, Moïse Kisling, Jean Cocteau, Kees van Dongen, Chaïm Soutine, and others. The memoirs were first published in English in 1930, but due to their sometimes explicit content, were banned in the United States until the 1970s.

However, the book had been reprinted under the title The Education of a Young Model throughout the 1950s and 1960s (e.g., a 1954 edition by Bridgehead has the Hemingway Introduction and photos and illustrations by Mahlon Blaine). These editions were mainly put out by Samuel Roth. Taking advantage of the fact that the banning of the book meant it did not receive copyright protection in the U.S., Roth put out a series of supposedly copyrighted editions (which were never registered with the Library of Congress) which altered the text and added illustrations – line drawings and photographs – which were not by Prin. Editions published in and after 1955 include an extra 10 chapters supposedly written by Prin 23 years after the original book, including a visit to New York where she meets with Samuel Roth and Ernest Hemingway; none of this was true. A copy of the first US edition (1930) was held in the section for banned books in the New York Public Library through the 1970s.

A new edition, edited by Billy Klüver and Julie Martin, was released in 1996.

- ISBN 0-88001-496-2, 1996 edition.

Further reading:

- Kiki's Memoirs, 1930 (2006) translation by Semoniff N., Salamandra P.V.V., 2011(in Russian)
- Kiki Souvenirs, 1929 (2005) translation by Semoniff N., Salamandra P.V.V., 2011(in Russian)
