= Maria Bonita =

Maria Bonita or María Bonita may refer to:

- Maria Bonita (bandit) (1911–1938), nickname of Maria Déia, Brazilian bandit
- María Bonita, a stage name of María Félix (1914–2002), Mexican actress and singer
- Maria Bonita (novel), a 1914 Brazilian romance novel
- Maria Bonita (film), a 1937 Brazilian film
- María Bonita (album), a 1992 album by Manuel Mijares
- María Bonita (telenovela), a 1995 Colombian telenovela
- "María Bonita" (song), a 1946 song composed and performed by Mexican composer Agustín Lara
