= Chateau des Fleurs =

Historic apartment building in Hollywood, California, U.S.

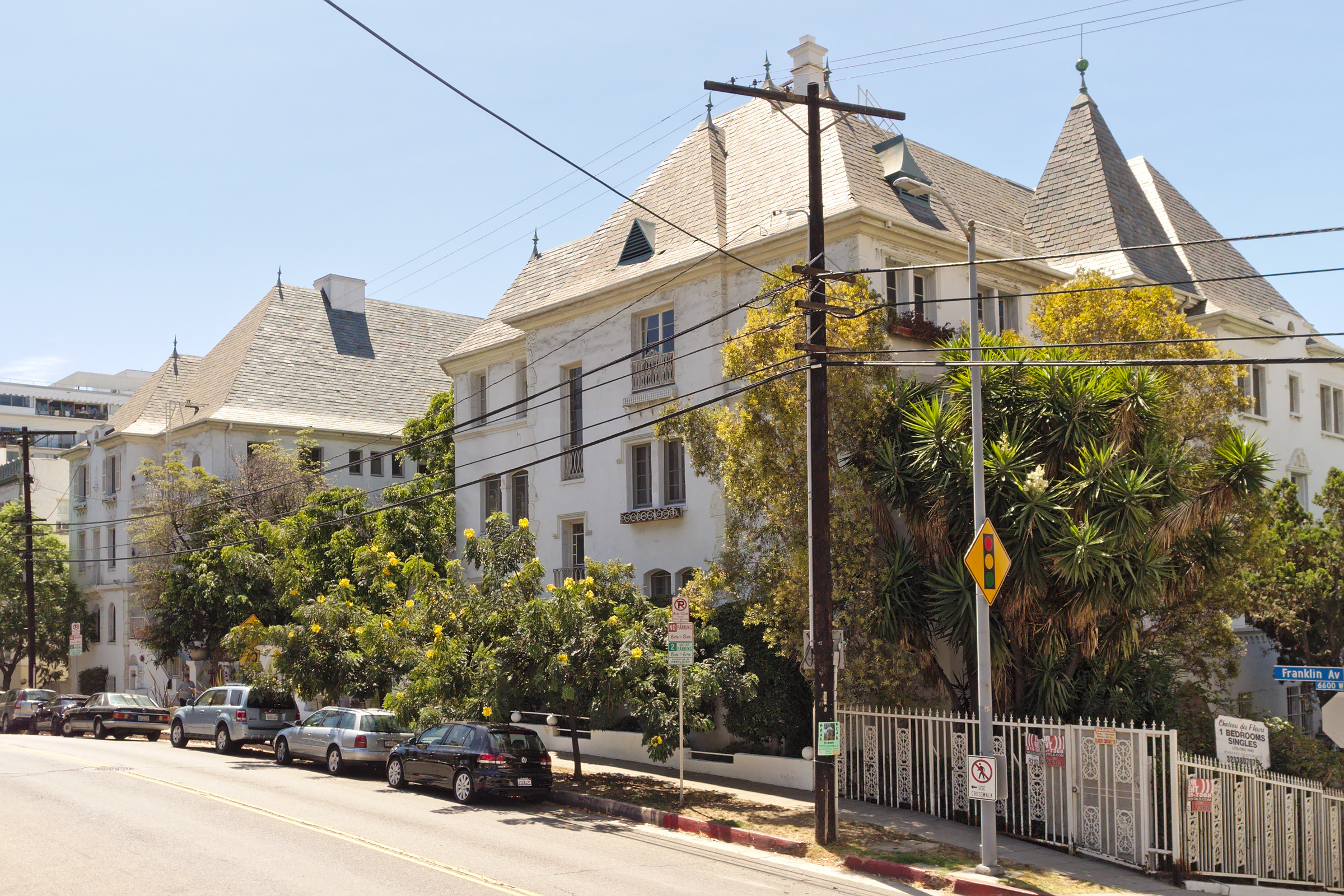
- The building in 2015
- Interactive map of the Chateau des Fleurs area

General information
- Type: Apartment building
- Architectural style: French Norman revival
- Location: 6626 Franklin Avenue, Hollywood, California, U.S.
- Coordinates: 34°06′18″N 118°20′04″W
- Completed: 1927

Design and construction
- Architect: Meyer-Radon brothers

Los Angeles Historic-Cultural Monument
- Designated: May 18, 2005
- Reference no.: 799

Chateau des Fleurs is a historic apartment building located at 6626 Franklin Ave. in Hollywood, California. It was declared Los Angeles Historic-Cultural Monument No. 799 in 2025.

== History ==
Chateau des Fleurs was designed by the Meyer-Radon brothers for Winifred Raab and built by the John A. Plat Construction Company in 1927. The cost of construction was $500,000 ($9.27 million in 2025). The location was previously the site of a house that both Jack Conway and Howard Hawks lived in.

The building was declared Los Angeles Historic-Cultural Monument No. 799 on May 18, 2005.

=== Notable residents ===
Actor Peter Graves's wife lived in the Chateau des Fleurs in the late 1940s and early 1950s. as did many members of the press. Karl Freund resided in the building in 1930, Diana Wynward and Bramwell Fletcher in 1932, and Man Ray lived in the building with Juliet Brower in 1940. Claude Flemming and Feodor Gontzoff also taught singing and music lessons out of their apartments while they lived in the building.

== Architecture and design ==
Chateau des Fleurs features a French Norman Revival design. When completed, the building contained fifty apartments, all soundproof and some with fireplaces, as well as a rooftop garden and children’s playground. The building's floors were made of oak and the walls, ceilings, and woodwork was decorated with oil paint.
