= Alice Prin =

French model and painter (1901–1953)

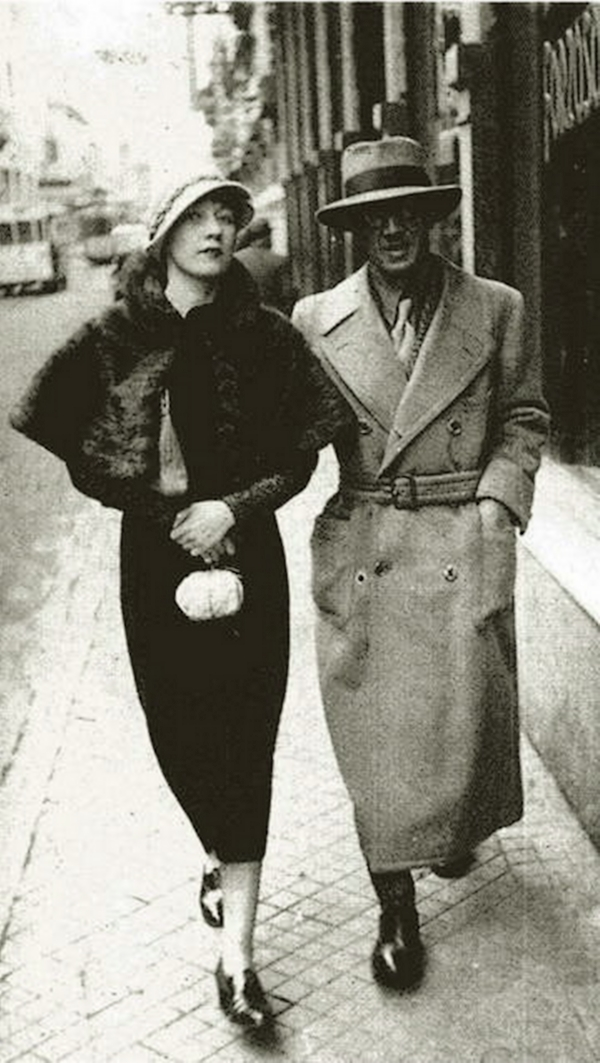
- "Kiki" and Tsuguharu Foujita, Paris, 1926, by Iwata Nakayama
- Born: 2 October 1901; Châtillon-sur-Seine, Côte d'Or, France
- Died: 29 April 1953 (aged 51); Montparnasse, Paris, France
- Occupations: Model; painter

Alice Ernestine Prin (2 October 1901 – 29 April 1953), nicknamed the Queen of Montparnasse and often known as Kiki de Montparnasse, was a French model, chanteuse, memoirist and painter during the Jazz Age. She flourished in, and helped define, the liberated culture of Paris in the so-called Années folles ("crazy years" in French). She became one of the most famous models of the 20th century and in the history of avant-garde art.

== Early life ==
Born an illegitimate child in Châtillon-sur-Seine, Côte d'Or, Alice Prin experienced an unpleasant "childhood that could only lead to laughter or despair". Raised in abject poverty by her grandmother, she traveled in 1913 at age twelve by train to live with her mother, a linotypist, to help earn an income for her family.

The young Prin endured a series of harsh and degrading jobs. She labored in shoe factories, printing shops, and bakeries. During this unhappy time, she began her lifelong joy of decorating herself. She often crumbled "a petal from her mother's fake geraniums to give color to her cheeks." A bakery fired her after "she darkened her eyebrows with burnt matchsticks".

By the age of fourteen, Prin's striking physique garnered the artistic attention of various Parisians. To earn money, she began surreptitiously posing nude for sculptors. "It bothered me a little to take off my clothes," Prin wrote in her memoirs, noting the practice reflected prevailing custom. Her nude modeling created discord with her mother. One day, her enraged mother intruded into an artist's studio. She denounced Prin as a shameless prostitute and disowned her forever.

In 1917, without money or a roof over her head, the teenage Kiki determined to make her living exclusively by posing for artists. As a beautiful dark-haired girl, she soon found herself in popular demand. At the time, due to her scant pubic hair, she occasionally drew fake hair with pieces of charcoal. As her fame grew, she became a local celebrity who symbolized the Montparnasse quarter's nonconformity and its rejection of the social norms of the petite bourgeoisie.

== Career ==
=== Modeling ===
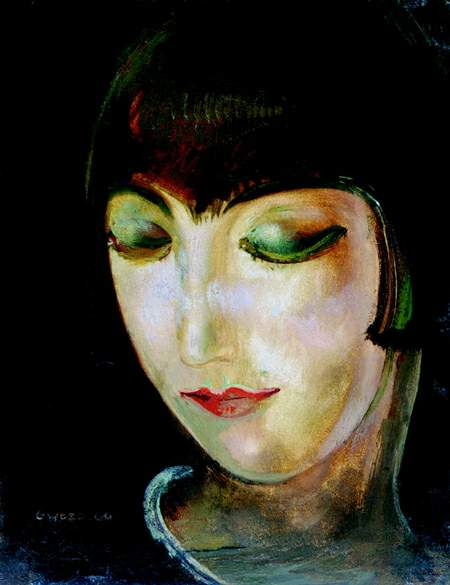
Kiki (left), c. 1920, painted by Gustaw Gwozdecki (1880–1935), and Le Violon d'Ingres (right), a photo by Man Ray, shows Kiki from the back, nude to below her waist, with two f-holes painted on to make her body resemble a violin.

Adopting a single name, "Kiki", Prin became a fixture of the Montparnasse social scene and a popular model, posing for dozens of artists, including Sanyu, Chaïm Soutine, Julien Mandel, Tsuguharu Foujita, Constant Detré, Francis Picabia, Jean Cocteau, Arno Breker, Alexander Calder, Per Krohg, Hermine David, Pablo Gargallo and Tono Salazar. Moïse Kisling painted a portrait of Kiki titled Nu assis, one of his best known. In his 1976 book Memoirs of Montparnasse, Canadian poet John Glassco recalled that:

Her maquillage was a work of art in itself ...her mouth painted a deep scarlet that emphasized the sly erotic humor of its contours. Her face was beautiful from every angle, but I liked it best in full profile, when it had the lineal purity of a stuffed salmon.

=== Man Ray ===
In Autumn 1921, Prin met the American visual artist Man Ray, and the two soon entered into a stormy eight-year relationship. She lived with Man Ray in his studio on rue Campagne-Première until 1929 during which time he made hundreds of portraits of her. She became his muse at the time and the subject of some of his best-known images, including the surrealist image Le Violon d'Ingres (Ingres' Violin) and Noire et blanche (Black and White).

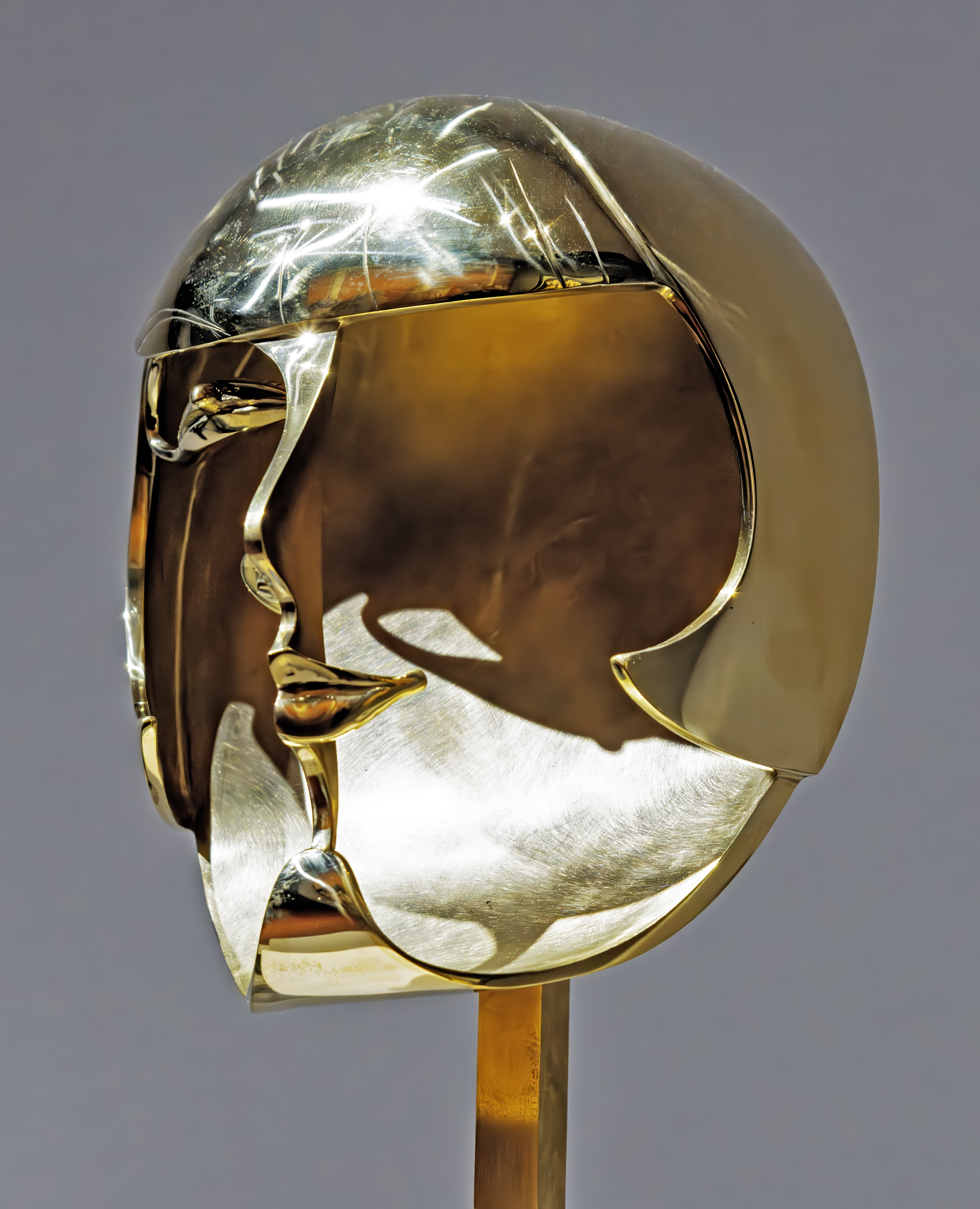
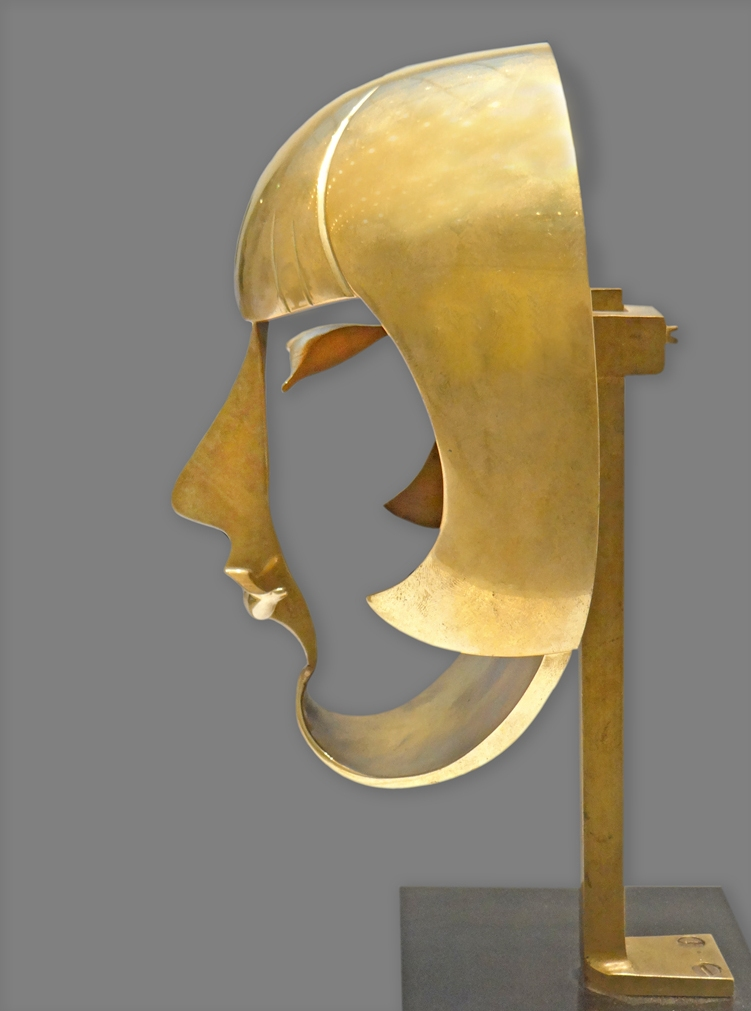
Kiki de Montparnasse (1928) by Pablo Gargallo

During their turbulent relationship, Man Ray labored obsessively on Prin's visual image. He "took her many steps beyond the primitive charcoal eyebrow-pencil she used for makeup as a teenager." Every night before going out together, he "meticulously applied her cosmetics and assisted in the choice of her clothes, creating a visual style that is as much a part of his oeuvre as any of his signed paintings". Her makeup often varied in "the color, thickness, and angle according to his mood. Her heavy eyelids, next, might be done in copper one day and royal blue another, or else in silver and jade."

=== Cultural zenith ===
By 1929, Prin reached the zenith of her fame. She had appeared in nine short and frequently experimental films, including Fernand Léger's 1923 Dadaist work Ballet mécanique without any credit. A symbol of bohemian and creative Paris and of the possibility of being a woman and finding an artistic place, the locals elected her as the Queen of Montparnasse at age 28. Despite her local fame, she continued to live a hand-to-mouth existence. Even during difficult times, she maintained her positive attitude, saying "all I need is an onion, a bit of bread, and a bottle of red [wine]; and I will always find somebody to offer me that."

For a few years during the 1930s, Prin owned the Montparnasse cabaret L'Oasis, later renamed Chez Kiki. Her music hall performances in black hose and garters included crowd-pleasing risqué songs, which were uninhibited, yet inoffensive. By the end of the 1930s, her fame waned as Montparnasse's role as an artistic center declined. During World War II, she departed Paris to avoid the occupying German army, which entered the city in June 1940. She did not return to live in the city immediately after the war.

== Artwork and autobiography ==
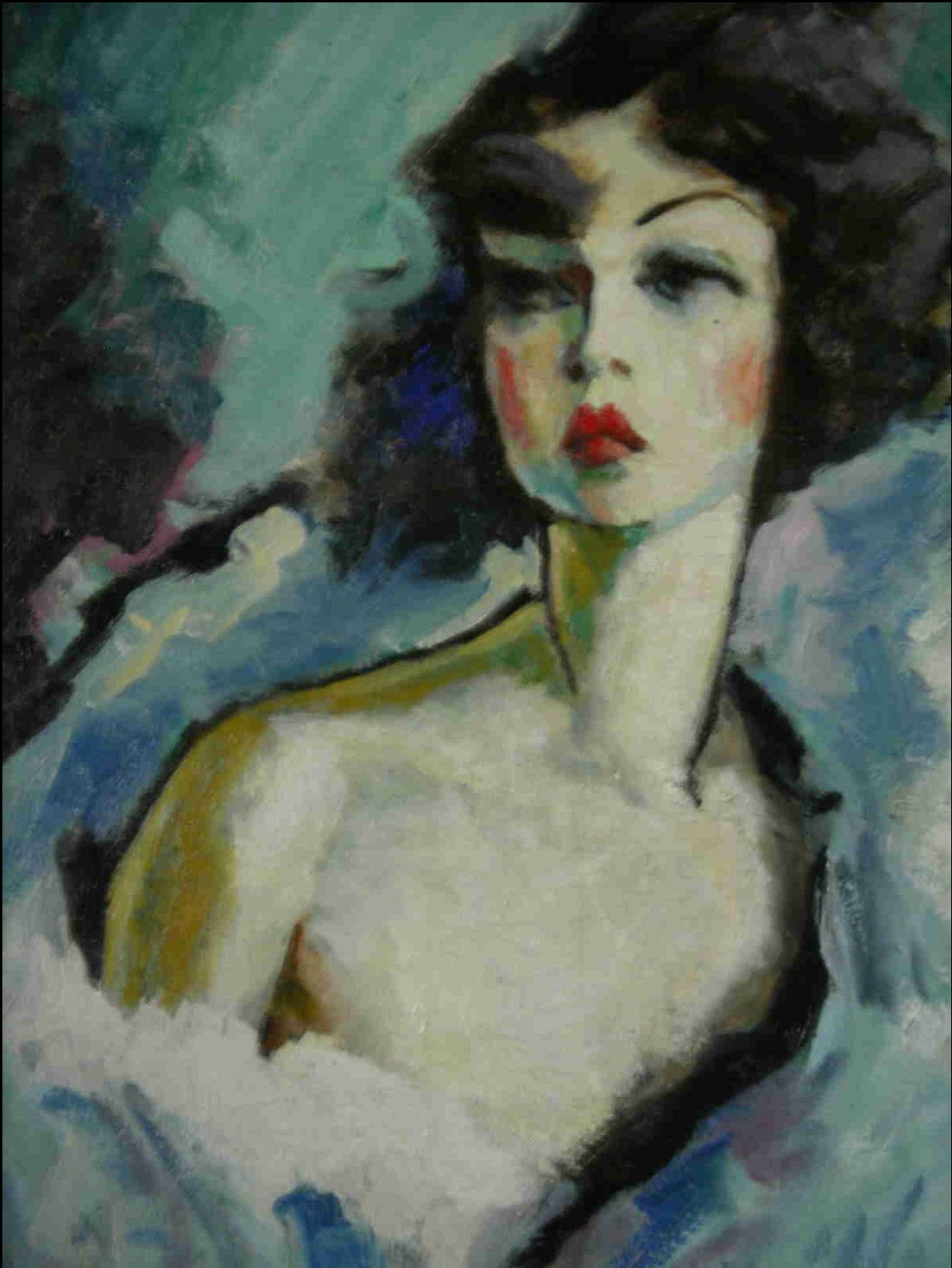
Constant Detré, Portrait of Kiki de Montparnasse, c. 1920–1925

A painter in her own right, Prin held a sold-out exhibition of her paintings in 1927 at the Galerie au Sacre du Printemps in Paris. Signing her work with her chosen single name, Kiki, her drawings and paintings comprise portraits, self-portraits, social activities, fanciful animals and dreamy landscapes composed in a light, expressionist style that is a reflection of her carefree manner and boundless optimism.

In 1929, she published an autobiography titled Kiki's Memoirs, with Ernest Hemingway and Tsuguharu Foujita providing introductions. In 1930, Samuel Putnam translated the book for its publication in Manhattan by Black Manikin Press. The United States government immediately banned the work. Publishers reprinted the work throughout the 1950s and 1960s under the title, The Education of a Young Model. For example, a 1954 Bridgehead edition includes the Hemingway introduction and photographs and illustrations by Mahlon Blaine. The New York Public Library retained a copy of the first U.S. edition in its banned books section through the 1970s.

An unscrupulous publisher, Samuel Roth, exploited the lack of U.S. copyright protection for Kiki's banned book. Roth released a series of supposedly copyrighted editions without registering them with the Library of Congress. He altered the text and added illustrations, such as line drawings and photographs, not created by Prin. In 1955, 23 years after the original book, Roth appended ten chapters falsely attributed to Prin, including an invented visit to New York where she met with Roth himself. None of this was true. In 1996, Ecco Press published Samuel Putnam's translation of the original autobiography.

== Death and legacy ==
During the final years of her life, Prin became addicted to substances, and accordianist André Laroque acted as her caretaker. Due to complications of alcoholism or drug dependence, she died at age 51 on 29 April 1953 after collapsing outside her flat in Montparnasse. A large crowd of artists and admirers attended her Paris funeral and followed the procession to her interment in the Cimetière parisien de Thiais. Her tomb identifies her as: "Kiki, 1901–1953, singer, actress, painter, Queen of Montparnasse".

Life magazine featured a three-page obituary of Prin in its 29 June 1953 edition, concluding with a memory from one of her friends who said: "We laughed, my God how we laughed." Tsuguharu Foujita remarked that, with Kiki's death, the glorious days of Montparnasse were buried forever.

Long after her death, Prin remains the embodiment of the outspokenness, audacity, and creativity that marked the interwar period of life in Montparnasse. She represents a strong artistic force in her own right as a woman. In 1989, biographers Billy Klüver and Julie Martin called her "one of the century's first truly independent women". In her honor, a daylily has been named Kiki de Montparnasse.

On 14 May 2022, Le Violon d'Ingres, which depicts Prin's back overlaid with a violin's f-holes, sold for $12.4 million, setting a record as the most expensive photograph ever sold at auction.

== Gallery ==
Kiki de Montparnasse by Julien Mandel

c. 1920

Postcard, c. 1920

== Filmography ==
Kiki's face in Ballet Mécanique (1923)

- 1923: L'Inhumaine by Marcel L'Herbier
- 1923: Le Retour à la raison by Man Ray, short film
- 1923: Ballet Mécanique by Fernand Léger, short film
- 1923: Entr'acte by René Clair, short film
- 1923: La Galerie des monstres by Jaque Catelain
- 1926: Emak-Bakia by Man Ray, short film
- 1928: L'Étoile de mer by Man Ray
- 1928: Paris express or Souvenirs de Paris by Pierre Prévert and Marcel Duhamel, short film
- 1930: Le Capitaine jaune by Anders Wilhelm Sandberg
- 1933: Cette vieille canaille by Anatole Litvak

== Kiki's Memoirs ==
- Anon. (n.d.). "The Classical Poses of Julian Mandel". Tallulahs Gallery. Archived from the original on 22 December 2007.
- Prin, Alice (1928). Les souvenirs de Kiki (in French). Preface by Tsuguharu Foujita. Introduction by Ernest Hemingway. Illustrations by Man Ray. Paris: Henri Broca. OCLC 459619230.
- Prin, Alice (1930). Kiki's Memoirs. Translated by Putnam, Samuel. Preface by Tsuguharu Foujita. Introduction by Ernest Hemingway. Illustrations by Man Ray, Foujita, et al. Paris: Edward W. Titus (Black Manikin Press). OCLC 463955972.
- Prin, Alice (1950). The Education of a French Model: The Loves, Cares, Cartoons, and Caricatures of Alice Prin. Translated by Putnam, Samuel. Introduction by Ernest Hemingway. Boar's Head. OCLC 1224376087.
- Kiki's Memoirs (1996) translation by Samuel Putnam (original ed. published by J. Corti, Paris) Kiki's memoirs. Hopewell, New Jersey: The Ecco Press. 1996. ISBN 0880014962.
- Souvenirs, introduction by Ernest Hemingway and Tsuguharu Foujita, foreword and notes by Billy Klüver and Julie Martin, translation by Dominique Lablanche, Hazan, 1999.
- Souvenirs retrouvés, preface by Serge Plantureux, José Corti, 2005.
- Kiki's Memoirs (2009) [Recuerdos recobrados] translation by José Pazó Espinosa (in Spanish – published by Nocturna)
- Kiki Souvenirs, 1929 (2005) translation by N. Semoniff (in Russian – published by Salamandra P.V.V., 2011)
- Kiki's Memoirs, 1930 (2006) translation by N. Semoniff (in Russian – published by Salamandra P.V.V., 2011)
