= Hollywood Melrose Hotel =

- U.S. National Register of Historic Places
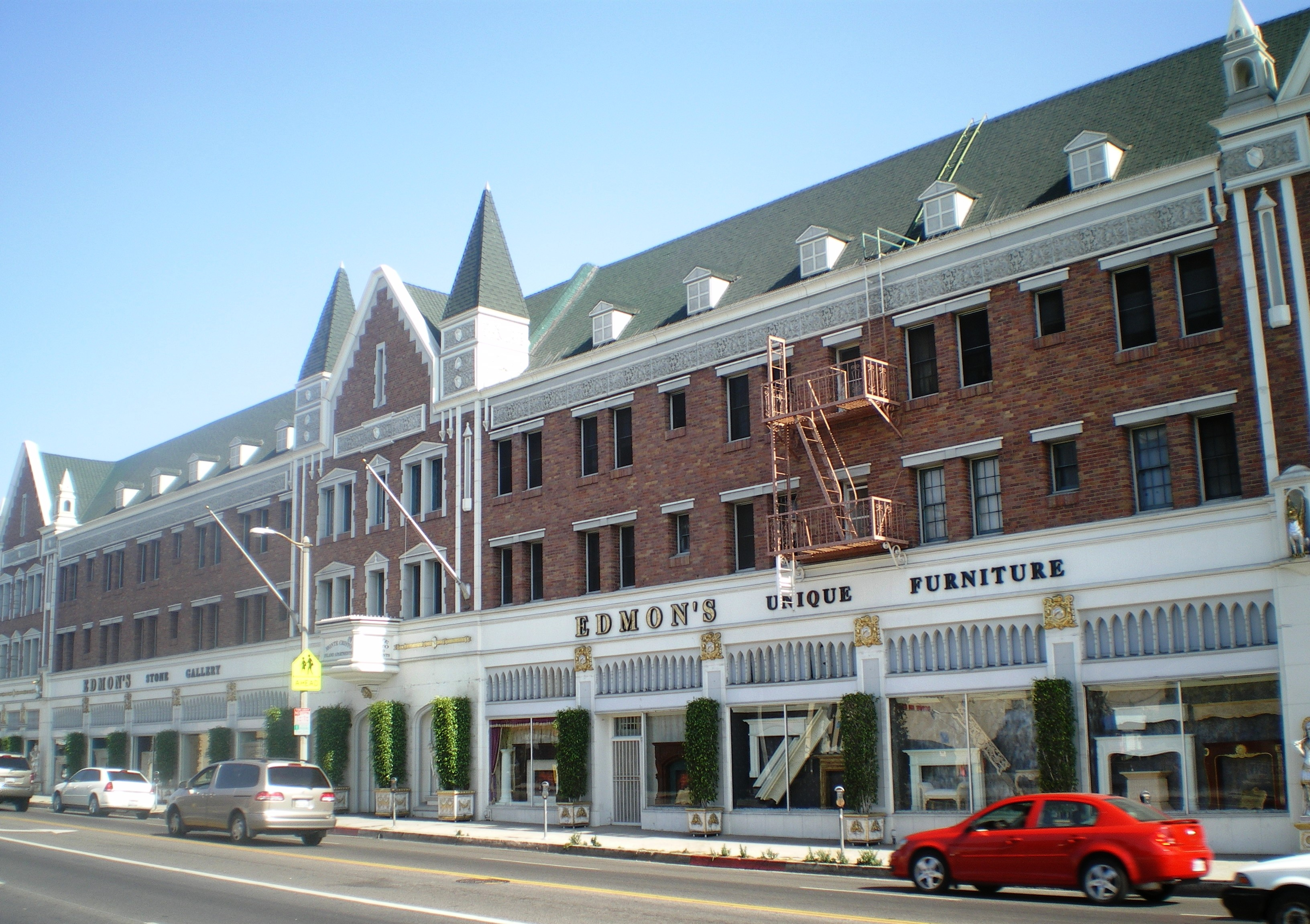
- Monte Cristo Island Apartments, 2008

- Location within the Los Angeles metropolitan area Location within California Location within the United States
- Location: 5150-5170 Melrose Ave., Los Angeles, California
- Coordinates: 34.083334°N 118.313079°W
- Built: 1927
- Architect: S. Charles Lee
- Architectural style: Late 19th and 20th Century Revivals
- NRHP reference No.: 92000834
- Added to NRHP: July 8, 1992

The Hollywood Melrose Hotel, also known previously as the Melrose Arms and later as the Monte Cristo Island Apartments, is a historic building on Melrose Avenue in Hollywood, California. Designed by S. Charles Lee, the structure was built in 1927. It has been used both as a hotel and apartments over the years of its existence, with commercial establishments on the first floor. In 1992, the building was listed on the National Register of Historic Places based on its architecture. In April 2010, the hotel was reopened as the newly restored Hollywood Historic Hotel. Edmon Simonian and his family own the property, and operate a furniture gallery located on the hotel's street level. All of the hotel's facades, common spaces, staircases and 62 rooms were restored to their former 1920s glory following an 18-month interior and exterior renovation. By 2021, the hotel had been stripped of many of its restored components. The lobby no longer includes a fireplace, the walls have been repainted cream, and all the bathrooms have been remodeled with new, more generic tubs, sinks, and mirrors.

It is Norman Revival in style, in interesting counterpoint to prevailing Spanish Colonial Revival styling in the area at the time.

The address given in its NRHP registration document is "Melrose Boulevard", but the street is Melrose Avenue.

== See also ==
- List of Registered Historic Places in Los Angeles
