= Júlio Afrânio Peixoto =

Brazilian writer (1876–1947)

- Born: December 17, 1876; Lençóis, Bahia, Brazil
- Died: January 12, 1947 (aged 70); Rio de Janeiro
- Occupations: Physician, writer, politician
- Writing career
- Pen name: Afrânio Peixoto
- Period: 1900–1947
- Genres: Novels, histories, biographies, linguistics
- Notable work: Rosa Mística
- Notable awards: Academia Brazileira de Letras; Academia Nacional de Medicina
- Movement: Symbolism

Júlio Afrânio Peixoto (December 17, 1876 – January 12, 1947) was a Brazilian physician, writer, politician, historian, professor, and pioneering eugenicist. He held many public offices, including Brazilian congressional representative from Bahia in the federal Câmara de Deputados (federal congressman) (1924–1930), first the president of the Universidade Federal do Rio de Janeiro, member of the Brazilian Cultural Center in the United States, president of the Academia Brasileira de Letras, and honorary doctorates from Coimbra University and the University of Lisbon, Portugal.

== Biography ==
Born in Lençóis and raised in the backlands of Bahia, and schooled mostly at home, Afrânio Peixoto nevertheless graduated in medicine in Salvador, at Brazil's oldest medical school, in 1897, when he was only 21 years old. His work "Epilepsy and crime" attracted national and international attention. In 1902 he moved to the then-Brazilian capital, Rio de Janeiro, and became a public health inspector and the director of the local mental hospital (Hospital Nacional de Alienados, currently Hospital Juliano Moreira). In 1907 he began lecturing at the Faculdade de Medicina. He married Francisca de Faria, in 1912, and they had one child, a son, "Juquinha" ("Little Juca"), who was both mentally ill and of poor physical health and who died in 1942. The extent to which his son's disabilities may have influenced Afrânio's opinions as a eugenicist is still debated. Dr. Júlio Afrânio Peixoto died of prostate cancer in Rio de Janeiro on January 12, 1947, at 70 years of age.

== Medicine ==
Afrânio Peixoto was a student and follower of Juliano Moreira, who initiated the scientific treatment of mental illness in Brazil and who invited his young protégé to Rio de Janeiro.

Afrânio Peixoto was active in many areas: mental health, public health, criminology, and workers' health. He was important in establishing the foundations of workers' health when he took the chair of forensic medicine in both the medical and law schools in Rio de Janeiro in 1907. From his pioneering studies of occupational risks and job-related accidents and diseases, many publications were released, and legal safety nets were finally established for Brazilian workers.

The only negative aspect of Afrânio Peixoto's highly successful career in medicine was his dispute with Brazilian parasitologist Carlos Chagas over the cause of what later became known as Chagas disease. Afrânio Peixoto used his influence and prestige to dispute Carlos Chagas' clinical and parasitological findings and to transfer credit for the discovery of the trypanosome to Oswaldo Cruz, much to the disadvantage of everyone concerned. Chagas disease is a chronic and debilitating parasitosis caused by a trypanosome that is vectored by a biting bug in rural areas. A commission of the Brazilian National Academy of Medicine reviewed the evidence and decided completely in favor of Carlos Chagas and against Afrânio Peixoto, whose real motive may have been professional resentment when he was passed over for the directorship of the Brazilian Department of Public Health in preference for his rival.

== Literature ==
It is in his writings that Afrânio Peixoto lives on, although most of his vast and varied literary output is currently out of print in Brazil and has apparently not been translated. The Library of Congress online catalog shows no English language translations and few modern editions in Portuguese (see: Peixoto, Afrânio). Other Brazilian literary figures of the first half of the twentieth century have fared better in the public's memory. The humorous short story The Alienist by Machado de Assis, for example, is required reading for many Brazilian university entrance exams, but students do not know that this could almost be a satire on Afrânio Peixoto and the Hospital Nacional de Alienados that he directed.

Afrânio Peixoto's principal works are: Rosa mística, drama (1900); Lufada sinistra, novel (1900); A esfinge, novel (1911); Maria Bonita, novel (1914); Minha terra e minha gente, history (1915); Poeira da estrada, literary criticism (1918); Trovas brasileiras (1919); José Bonifácio, o velho e o moço, biography (1920); Fruta do mato, novel (1920); Castro Alves, o poeta e o poema (1922); Bugrinha, novel (1922); Dicionário dos Lusíadas, linguistic dictionary (1924); Camões e o Brasil, essays (1926); Arte poética, essay (1925); As razões do coração, novel (1925); Uma mulher como as outras, novel (1928); História da literatura brasileira (1931); Panorama da literatura brasileira (1940); Pepitas, essays (1942); Collected works (1942); Literary works, ed. Jackson, 25 vols. (1944); Collected novels (1962). In addition to these, he published the commented works of other authors and numerous books on medicine, history, oratory, and literature.

In 2017, the Brazilian copyright on Afrânio Peixoto's works expires; after this, they can be distributed freely on the internet.

== Political views ==
In his political views, amply expressed while he was living, Júlio Afrânio claimed to be on the side of whatever government is in power. During his lifetime Brazil had five constitutions and ranged from democracy to dictatorship under Getúlio Vargas. Afrânio was a leftist, but not a fanatical leftist. He was interested in human genetics and eugenics. He held now-discredited views on race, but he was never antisemitic. Júlio Afrânio Peixoto was also an atheist and a freemason.

== See also ==
- Article on Afrânio Peixoto in the Portuguese language Wikipedia (in Portuguese)
