= Norman Revival architecture =

Norman Revival architecture is an architectural style.

In the United Kingdom, "Norman style", also known as "Lombard style", may be essentially a synonym for Romanesque Revival architecture.

In the United States, Romanesque Revival architecture evolved differently. Notable was the divergence of Richardsonian Romanesque architecture as an important subtype. Norman Revival, likewise, means a somewhat different styling than traditional Romanesque Revival. Chateau des Fleurs and Melrose Arms are examples in Los Angeles, California.

"Norman" is a term used in conjunction with the style that emerged from the Pacific Northwest Region of the United States Forest Service; this style "had no clearly identifiable architectural prototype, but reflected the influence of the English Cottage and Norman Farmhouse styles."

== See also ==
- Norman architecture
