= L'Étoile de mer =

1928 film

- Directed by: Man Ray; Jacques-André Boiffard
- Written by: Robert Desnos
- Produced by: Man Ray
- Starring: Kiki of Montparnasse (Alice Prin); André de la Rivière; Robert Desnos
- Release date: 1928 (France)
- Running time: 17 minutes
- Country: France

L'Étoile de mer (English: The Starfish) is a 1928 film directed by Man Ray and based on a short poem and longer scenario, both written by Robert Desnos. The film depicts a couple (played by Alice Prin, a.k.a. "Kiki", and André de la Rivière) acting through scenes that are shot out of focus, and with Desnos himself as the second man in the final scene.

== Synopsis ==
L'Étoile de mer (1928)

Almost all of the scenes in this film are shot either off a mirror like the final shot, or through what appears to be diffused and textured glass. After opening to the couple walking along a road, the scene cuts to a caption

Les dents des femmes sont des objets si charmants... (Women's teeth are such charming things...)

A short scene where the female alters her stocking.

... qu' on ne devrait les voir qu' en rêve ou à l'instant de l'amour. (... that one ought to see them only in a dream or in the instant of love.)

From this point the couple retire to the upper bedroom of a house and the female undresses and retires, at which point the male bids her farewell.

Si belle! Cybèle? (So beautiful! Cybèle?)

The male leaves the house.

Nous sommes à jamais perdus dans le désert de l'éternèbre. (We are forever lost in the desert of eternal darkness. Éternèbre is a portmanteau of éternel (eternal) and ténèbre (darkness))

The film cuts to a female selling newspapers in the street, this is André de la Rivière in drag.

Qu'elle est belle (How beautiful she is)

A man is shown purchasing a starfish in a jar, returning it home to examine further.

"Après tout" ("After all")

The film then changes focus, following newspapers being blown in the wind while a man attempts to pick them up. Scenes from a railway journey appear briefly, tugboats docking at a wharfside followed by a panning city scape.

Si les fleurs étaient en verre (If the flowers were made of glass)

Followed by a montage of various rotating objects, including the starfish in a jar. A few still lifes appear, again featuring the starfish.

Belle, belle comme une fleur de verre (Beautiful, beautiful like a glass flower)
Belle comme une fleur de chair (Beautiful like a flower of flesh)
Il faut battre les morts quand ils sont froids. (One must strike the dead while they are cold. cf. Il faut battre le fer quand il est chaud - Strike while the iron is hot)

We rejoin the man as he ascends the staircase to the upper bedroom in the house, leaving the starfish at the foot of the stairs. The film cuts to the woman brandishing a large knife superimposed with the starfish.

Les murs de la Santé (The walls of the Santé)
Et si tu trouves sur cette terre une femme à l'amour sincère... (And if you find on this earth a woman whose love is true...)
Belle comme une fleur de feu (Beautiful like a flower of fire)
Le soleil, un pied à l'étrier, niche un rossignol dans un voile de crêpe. (The sun, one foot in the stirrup, nestles a nightingale in a mourning veil.)

We return to the female reclining in the bedroom.

Vous ne rêvez pas (You are not dreaming)

The film then reveals a short end to the characters love triangle.

Qu'elle était belle (How beautiful she was)
Qu'elle est belle (How beautiful she is)

The female appears in a mirror with the word 'belle', which shatters. The affair is over, and the film brings to a close.

== Production ==
L'Étoile de mer

Qu'elle est belle
Après tout
Si les fleurs étaient en verre
Belle, belle comme une fleur en verre
Belle comme une fleur de chair
Vous ne rêvez pas!
Belle comme une fleur de feu
Les murs de la santé
Qu'elle "était" belle
Qu'elle "est" belle.

— Robert Desnos

Shortly before sailing to Cuba on 21 February 1928, Desnos had written the short poem above inspired by a starfish he owned, and which he viewed as the symbolic incarnation of a lost love. During a farewell dinner held that evening with Man Ray, Kiki and one of her friends, Desnos read out this poem, further elaborated into a scenario comprising fifteen to twenty verses, (Note: Desnos's scenario, long believed to have been lost, was found in the New York Museum of Modern Art in 1986 and shows that Desnos wrote the first draft, on which Man Ray added remarks in pencil and red and blue crayon.) and using the lines of the short poem as intertitles. Deeply affected by Desnos's reading, Man Ray immediately saw in it the scenario of a surrealist film and promised the poet—who therefore entrusted his scenario to Man Ray—that it would be completed in time for his return from Cuba a few weeks later. The next day, Man Ray started the project by filming the final scene, featuring Desnos himself. In addition to using the lines of the short poem as intertitles, Man Ray reproduced a phrase from Desnos's Deuil pour Deuil ("Les dents des femmes sont des objets si charmants qu’on ne devrait les voir qu'en rêve ou à l'instant de l'amour", where "l'amour" replaced Desnos's original "la mort"), as well as other surrealist word games ("Si belle! Cybèle?"; "Il faut battre les morts quand ils sont froids"), or simply "Adieu".

Man Ray used a gelatine dry-plate process to achieve the effect of textured glass and render the spectral images of the film like a drawing or rudimentary painting, thus also resolving his concern about the censorship of nude scenes.

Originally a silent film, recent copies have been dubbed using music taken from Man Ray's personal record collection of the time. The musical reconstruction was by Jacques Guillot.

== See also ==
- Cinéma Pur
- Surrealist cinema
