= Noire et Blanche =

Photograph by Man Ray

- Black and White (English)
- Artist: Man Ray
- Completion date: May 1, 1926
- Medium: Gelatin silver print
- Subject: Alice Prin
- Dimensions: 17.1 cm × 22.5 cm (6 3/4 in × 8 7/8 in)

Noire et Blanche (French: Black and White) is a black and white photograph taken by American visual artist Man Ray in 1926. It is one of his most famous photographs at the time when he was an exponent of Surrealism.

== History ==
The picture was first published in the Parisian Vogue magazine, on 1 May 1926, with the title Visage de Nacre et Masque d'Ébene. It would be published once again with the current title in the French magazines Variétés and Art et Décoration in 1928.

Man Ray had already published a similar photograph in the cover of the Dada magazine of Francis Picabia, with the title Black and White, in 1924, depicting two statuettes, one European and classical and the other African.

== Description ==
The title of the photograph refers both to the medium of black and white photography and the duality expressed in the dichotomy between the caucasian female model and the African black mask. The photograph depicts the famous French model Kiki de Montparnasse, posing expressionless, with her eyes closed and her head lying on a table, holding with her left hand a black African mask vertically upon its surface. The picture juxtaposes the similarities between the soft oval white face of the model, as if she were a living mask, with the shiny black mask, also with eyes closed and a serene expression. It also expresses the artist's interest in African art, which had a huge influence in the artistic movements of the first decades of the 20th century.

== Art market ==
A print of the photograph sold by $3,131,533 at 8 November 2017, at Christie's, Paris. Another print sold by $4,020,000 at 17 November 2022, at Christie's, making it the fourth most expensive ever at the art maket. A third print reached $2,878,148 at 25 June 2025, at Sotheby's New York.

== Collections ==
There are prints of the photograph in several museums, including the Museum of Modern Art, in New York, and the Stedelijk Museum, in Amsterdam.

== See also ==
- List of most expensive photographs
