= Le Violon d'Ingres =

1924 photograph by Man Ray

- Ingres' Violin (English)
- Artist: Man Ray
- Completion date: 1924
- Catalogue: 86.XM.626.10
- Medium: Gelatin silver print
- Subject: Alice Prin
- Dimensions: 29.6 cm × 22.7 cm (11.625 in × 8.9375 in)
- Location: J. Paul Getty Museum, Los Angeles
- Website: www.getty.edu/art/collection/object/104E4A

Le Violon d'Ingres (French for Ingres' Violin) is a black-and-white photograph created by American visual artist Man Ray in 1924. It is one of his best-known photographs and of surrealist photography. The picture was first published in the Surrealist magazine Littérature in June 1924. It shows model Kiki de Montparnasse from the back, nude to below her waist, with two f-holes painted on to draw similarities between the shape of her body and a violin.

== Analysis ==
In French, a violon d'Ingres is a hobby, alluding to the painter Jean-Auguste-Dominique Ingres's pastime of playing the violin when not painting. Man Ray admired Ingres's work and he drew inspiration from his painting The Valpinçon Bather (1808) for this photograph.

He had his model and then-lover Kiki de Montparnasse pose for him. In a first photograph, Étude pour Le Violon d'Ingres, she is seen in profile, with her face and breasts visible. In the final picture, she is depicted in a similar way to the female model of Ingres, nude and seated, looking slightly to her left, seen from the back and with an oriental inspired turban. Her arms are not visible. After the photograph was developed, he painted on a print the f-holes of a violin onto her back, and had the print rephotographed, creating the final piece.

The title humorously shows Ray's goal of depicting the model's torso as a musical instrument, and plays with the fact that she was the artist's model and lover at the same time.

Kirsten Hoving Powell stated on the photograph: "Le Violon d'Ingres is a complex photograph that demonstrates Man Ray's long‐standing admiration for Ingres, as well as his desire to mock tradition. Man Ray's distortion and deformation of the model's body engage Surrealist concepts of metamorphosis and formlessness, but they also belong to a larger context of fascination for Ingres' manipulations of anatomy during the interwar period, as seen in the writings of critics such as André Lhote."

== Art market ==
An original print of Le Violon d'Ingres set a record for the most expensive photograph when it sold for $12,400,000, on 14 May 2022, at Christie's New York.

== Public collections ==
There are prints of the photograph at the Musée National d'Art Moderne, in Paris, and at the J. Paul Getty Museum, in Los Angeles.

== See also ==
- List of most expensive photographs
- List of photographs considered the most important
