= Le Retour à la raison =

1923 Man Ray film

- Directed by: Man Ray
- Produced by: Man Ray
- Starring: Kiki of Montparnasse
- Release date: 1923 (France)
- Running time: 2 minutes
- Country: France

Le Retour à la raison (French for Return to Reason) is a 1923 short film directed by Man Ray. It consists of animated textures, rayographs and the torso of Kiki of Montparnasse.

== Content ==
Return to Reason (1923)

The film features a small segment with Ray's work Dancer/Danger. The film is described as follows:"consists of moving geometric designs, intercut with distorted night shots of a merry-go-round, then moving three dimensional shapes, and closing with the play of bars of light on a woman's nude torso. It was an experiment in abstract expressionism that inspired other directors."

== Production ==
"Acquiring a roll of a hundred feet of film, I went into my darkroom and cut up the material into short lengths, pinning them down on the worktable. On some strips I sprinkled salt and pepper, like a cook preparing a roast, on other strips I threw pins and thumbtacks at random; then I turned on the white light for a second or two, as I had done for my still Rayographs. Then I carefully lifted the film off the table, shaking off the debris, and developed it in my tanks. The next morning, when dry, I examined the work; the salt, pins and tacks were perfectly reproduced." explained Man Ray, in Self-Portrait.

== See also ==
- Cinéma Pur
