= Maria Bonita (novel) =

1914 romance novel by Afrânio Peixoto

- Author: Afrânio Peixoto
- Language: Portuguese
- Genre: Romance novel
- Publication date: 1914
- Publication place: Brazil

Maria Bonita is a romance novel, one of a trilogy, based on the story of Maria, the wife of João Lopes da Costa Pinho. João Lopes da Costa Pinho emigrated to Brazil from Vila Nova de Gaia in Portugal. Some say he arrived barefoot but he went on to be immensely wealthy, owning some 32 cattle and cocoa farms in the state of Bahia, northeast Brazil. The marriage did not last but in their time together they became friends with the author Afrânio Peixoto and their colourful lives inspired this 1914 novel which caused a storm.

In 1937 the book was turned into a film directed by Julien Mandel. Peixoto wrote the screenplay.

== Sources ==
- Richard Young, Odile Cisneros. Historical Dictionary of Latin American Literature and Theater. Scarecrow Press; 2011. Accessed May 25, 2025. https://search.ebscohost.com/login.aspx?direct=true&db=nlebk&AN=350563&lang=ru&site=eds-live&scope=site
- História concisa da literatura brasileira
- Performance da Ginga: A Dança de Samba de Gafieira
