= Emak Bakia =

1926 film

Emak-Bakia (Leave Me Alone)
- Directed by: Man Ray
- Written by: Man Ray
- Produced by: Man Ray
- Starring: Man Ray; Kiki of Montparnasse (Alice Prin); Jacques Rigaut
- Edited by: Man Ray
- Release date: 1926 (France)
- Running time: 19 minutes
- Country: France
- Language: Silent

Emak Bakia (Note: Various recent sources in English hyphenate the title (Emak-Bakia).) (Basque for Leave me alone; full title: Emak Bakia (CInépoème) (Fichez-moi la paix)) is a 1926 French surrealist short film directed by Man Ray. Termed as a cinépoème (cinematic poem) by its author, it features many techniques Man Ray used in his still photography (for which he is better known), including Rayographs, double exposure, soft focus and ambiguous features.

== Synopsis ==
Emak Bakia (1926)

Emak Bakia shows elements of fluid mechanical motion in parts, rotating artifacts showing his ideas of everyday objects being extended and rendered useless. Kiki of Montparnasse (Alice Prin) is shown driving a car in a scene through a town. Towards the middle of the film Jacques Rigaut appears dressed in female clothing and make-up. Later in the film a caption appears: "La raison de cette extravagance" (the reason for this extravagance). The film then cuts to a car arriving and a passenger leaving with briefcase entering a building, opening the case revealing men's shirt collars which he proceeds to tear in half. The collars are then used as a focus for the film, rotating through double exposures.

== Production ==
The film features sculptures by Pablo Picasso, and some of Man Ray's mathematical objects both still and animated using a stop motion technique.

Originally a silent film, recent copies have been dubbed using music taken from Man Ray's personal record collection of the time. The musical reconstruction was led by Jacques Guillot.

== Release ==
When the film was first exhibited at the Vieux Colombier theatre, a man in the audience stood up to complain it was giving him a headache and hurting his eyes. Another man told him to shut up, and they both started to fight. The theatre turned into a frenzy, the fighting ended up out in the street, and the police were called in to stop the riot.

== Legacy ==
In 2012, Spanish director Oskar Alegria directed a feature-length documentary film La Casa Emak Bakia which details his search for the house where Emak Bakia was filmed.

== Sources ==
- Chris Dashiell, Flicks (March 2001)

== See also ==
- Cinéma Pur
- Dadaist poets
- Surrealist cinema
