= Constant Detré =

French painter

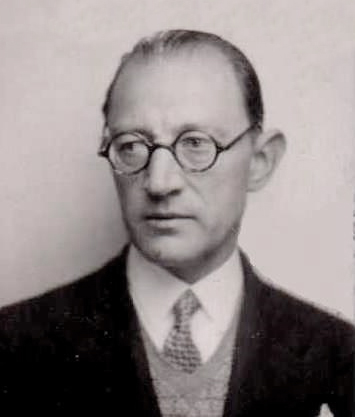
- Constant Detré
- Born: Szilárd Eduard Diettmann; 2 January 1891; Paris, France
- Died: 10 April 1945 (aged 54); Paris, France
- Known for: Painting
- Movement: Post-Impressionism, Art Nouveau, School of Paris

Constant Detré (Szilárd Eduard Diettmann, 2 January 1891 – 10 April 1945) was a Hungarian artist. He settled in Paris where he mixed from 1920 to 1940 with representatives of the School of Paris and other Montparnasse artists, several of whom were Central European émigrés like himself, such as Pascin, a good friend of his.

== Early life ==
For the lack of extensive data, the artist’s biography is difficult to piece together. It has been ascertained with some degree of confidence that his forebears were all in varying degrees artists from Central Europe. His great-grandfather Clémens Dittmann was a sculptor who moved from Vienna to Budapest early during the 19th century, where he worked on several important buildings. (Note: Catholic Church of de Budapest-Ferencvàros. Karoly Palace is one of the most important classical buildings of Budapest's 5th district, edified in 1822. The amphitheatre of the National Theatre (1837).) His grandfather Eduard Diettmann (Dittmann) was a sculptor who married a Hungarian woman. (Note: A particularity of the Diettmanns was that the males were Evangelical Protestants (Lutherans) while the females were Catholics: for each wedding a dispensation was required to conduct the wedding ceremony at the Evangelical church of Deàk square, Budapest.) Constant Detré's father, Eduard Diettmann, (Note: Around that time the letter E appears in the Diettmann surname.) a steam engine mechanic, died too early to make a name for himself as an artist.

Detré studied painting in Munich with one of the greatest Hungarian representatives of 19th century Naturalism and Realism, the Hungarian artist Simon Hollósy, who organized study sessions in the Carpathian Mountains for his students at the private painting school he had founded in the Bavarian capital in 1886. (Note: Maurice Henrion, Treasurer of the French Foreign Critique (Trésorier de la Critique Etrangère de France).)

== Career ==
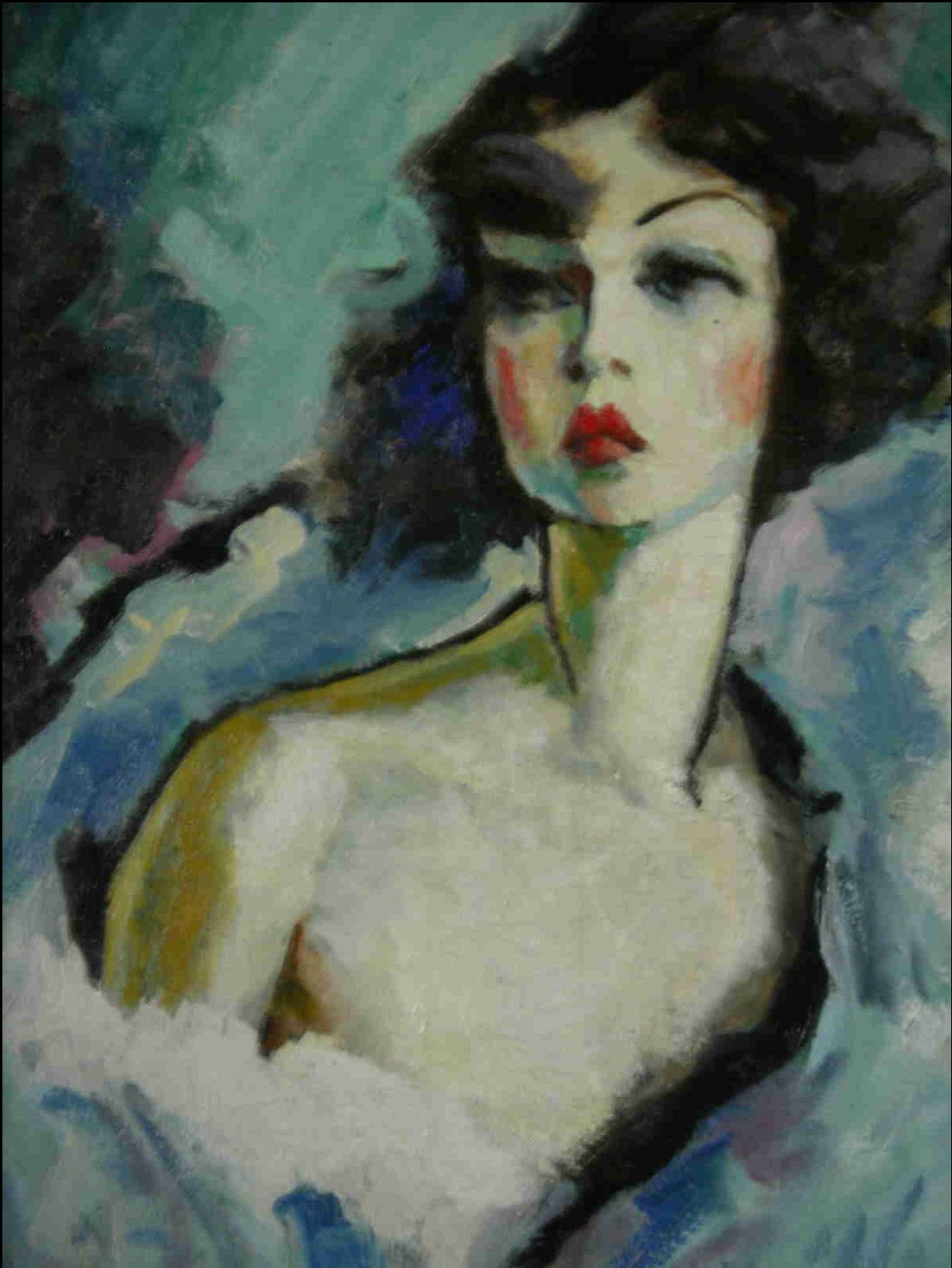
Constant Detré, Portrait of Kiki de Montparnasse

Detré went to Paris in 1914, before returning to Hungary, but would leave shortly thereafter, perhaps as a result of the brutal anti-communist repression launched by the Miklós Horthy regime. A member of Detré's future wife's family, it was rumored, served as an "artistic advisor" in the government of Béla Kun, but if so, it was not by official decree. In 1919 Detré returned to Munich and became the theatre director of a pantomime company. He moved to Paris in time for 1925 Exposition Internationale des Arts Décoratifs et Industriels Modernes (International Exposition of Modern Decorative and Industrial Arts). He became an acquaintance of Henri Matisse, Raoul Dufy, Tsuguharu Foujita, Moïse Kisling, Kiki de Montparnasse (who modeled for him on several occasions) and a close friend of Pascin. During the 1920s Detré and Pascin often met at Le Dôme Café and the Jockey-Club de Paris, forming an intricate part of bohemian life of Montparnasse.

Detré made a living translating, writing, and creating for the Théâtre de l'Arc en Ciel with its founder and compatriot Géza Blattner, a Hungarian puppeteer, painter, scenographer and director of adult puppet productions. Marie Vassilieff and others participated as well.

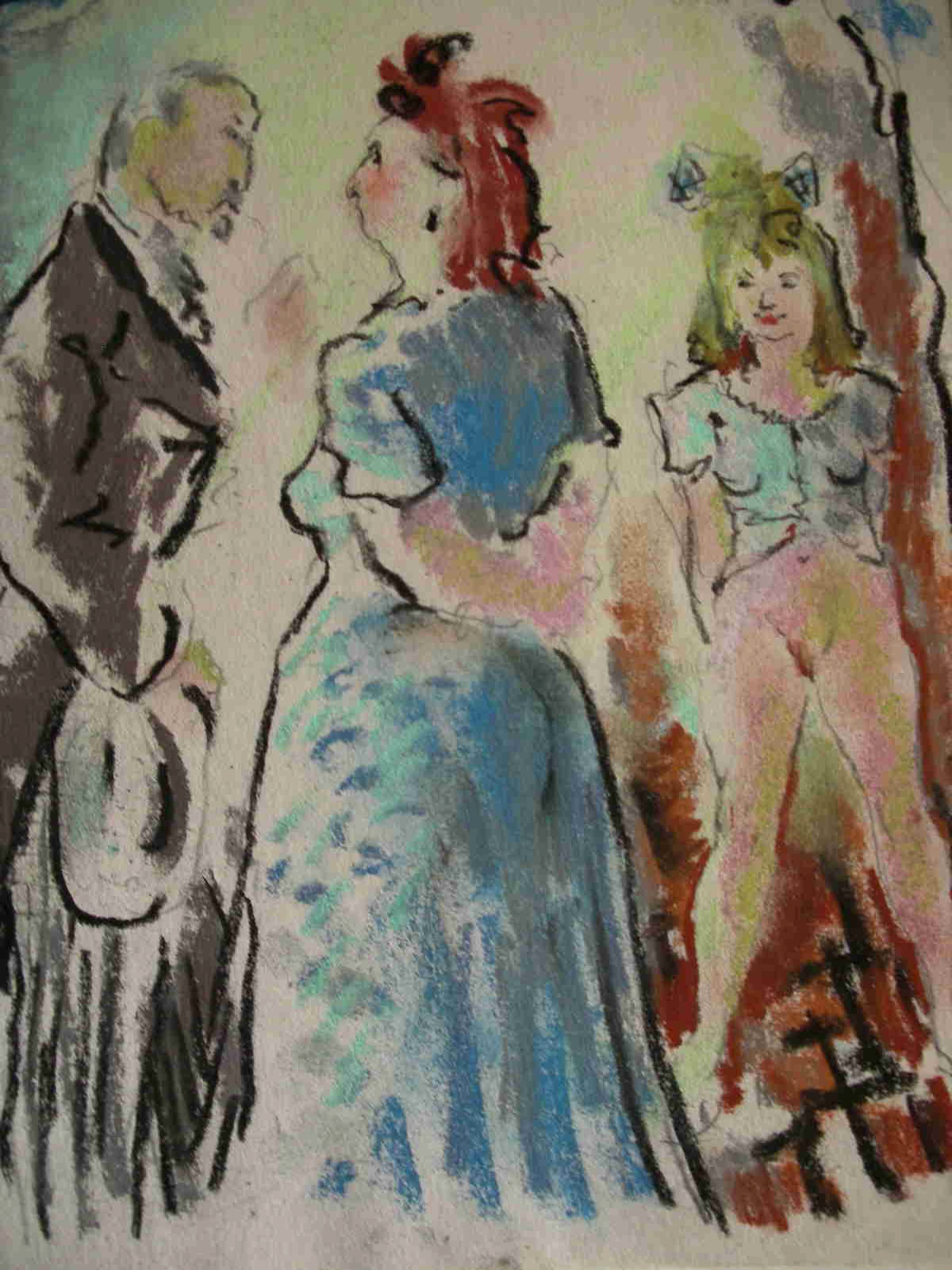
Constant Detré, A La Lanterne, ca. 1925, brothel scene, pastel on paper

His first marriage with the Hungarian Marie Mirkovsky (Note: Detré's first wife, Marie Mirkovsky, is thought to have been a dancer from Budapest.) ended in a divorce. On 30 December 1933, he married Claire Carnat, a young artist and puppet designer from a French family. He became a naturalized French citizen shortly before World War II, on 27 November 1936.

Detré worked as a professor at the Académie Julian, teaching life drawing, the art of fashion, composition, color harmony, model creation, theater art, costume design, theater history, decor, stage sets, modeling, and in situ studies at theaters throughout Paris.

His ink drawings (Miseries and Cannon Merchants) represent his indignant reaction against all forms of prevailing injustices. He illustrated books (Zola’s Thérèse Raquin). Like Toulouse-Lautrec, he was attracted to brothels, as is evident in his so-called Dessins à la Lanterne (lantern drawings), reflecting the mood and feeling and his ability to understand the Parisian atmosphere during the 1920s and 1930s in Paris.

Detré's pastels (his favorite medium) show great virtuosity and originality. Subjects vary from trenchant social criticism to colorful landscapes, portraits, domestic and brothel scenes not unlike those of Toulouse-Lautrec whose influence he recognized. Yet he had his own way of treating his subject-matter, with ordinary everyday scenes, peopled with nonchalant, sometimes withdrawn, but always vibrant characters. Occasionally he painted himself as a voyeur gazing from within the canvas at his unsuspecting models, "gazing benevolently at his subjects from within his pastels", according to his daughter, "representing himself as his own subject-matter, a timeless two dimensional transfer, a cut-out figure of the artist amongst his flesh-and-bone creatures."

His work is found in auction houses, though less so in museums. In the 1960s, several works were placed in public auctions at Hôtel Drouot in Paris, and elsewhere, by the artist's family and his only daughter so that examples of his production continue to be seen by private collectors in Europe. His works continue to be auctioned in Paris at Hôtel Drouot.

His daughter, Marie-Claire Diettmann-Coutan, has published a book in his memory, with collected written testimonials and photographic reproductions of his work.
