= Man Ray =

American and French visual artist (1890–1976)

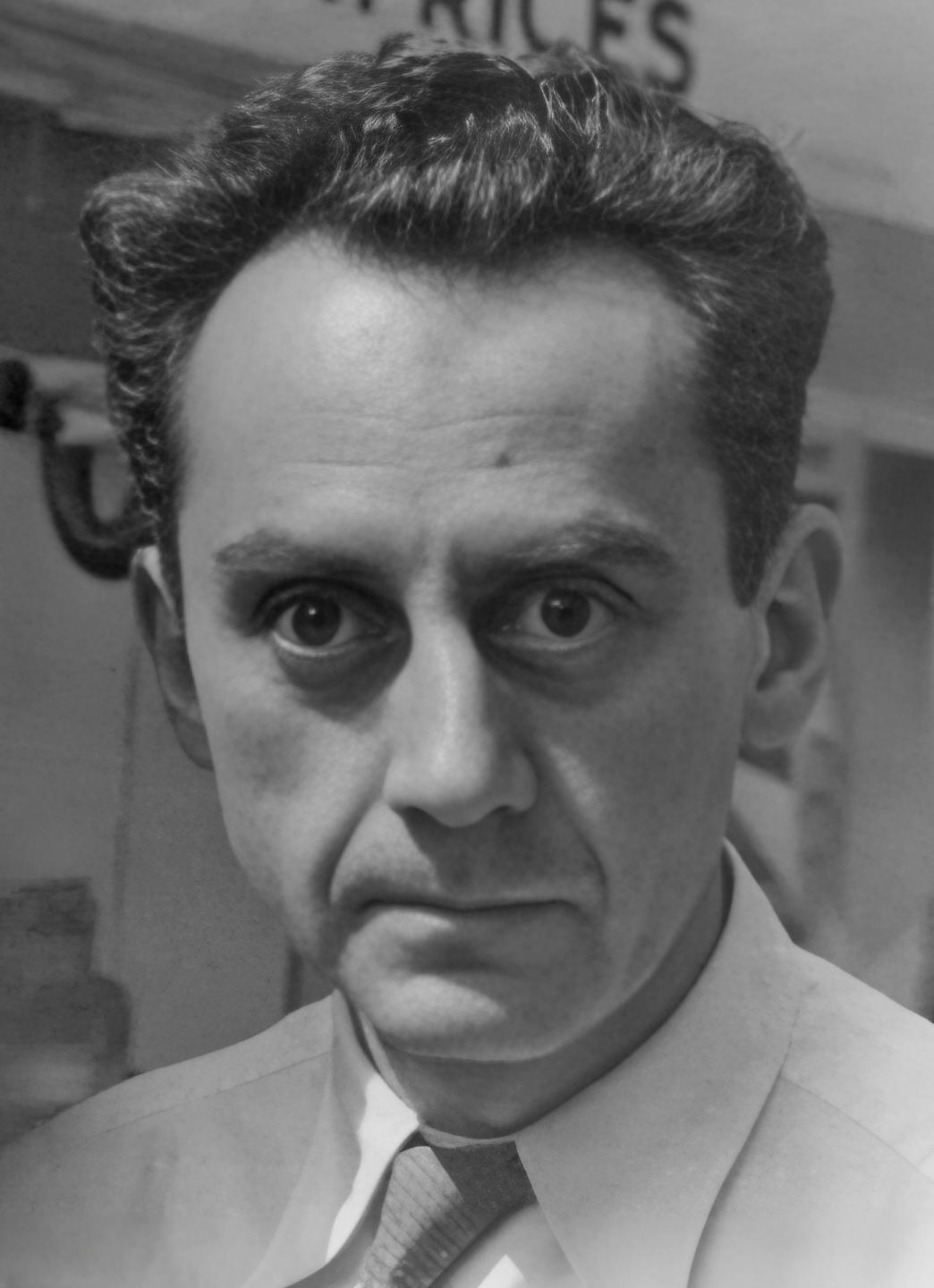
- Man Ray in 1934
- Born: Emmanuel Radnitzky; August 27, 1890; Philadelphia, Pennsylvania, U.S.
- Died: November 18, 1976 (aged 86); Paris, France
- Known for: Painting, photography, assemblage, collage, film
- Movement: Dada, surrealism
- Spouses: Adon Lacroix (m. 1914; div. 1937) Juliet Browner (m. 1946)
- Partners: Lee Miller (c. 1929; sep. 1932); Ady Fidelin (c. 1934; sep. 1940)

Man Ray (born Emmanuel Radnitzky; August 27, 1890 – November 18, 1976) was an American-born, French-naturalized visual artist who spent most of his career in Paris. He was a significant contributor to the Dada and Surrealist movements, although his ties to each were informal. He produced major works in a variety of media but considered himself a painter above all. He was a photography innovator as well as a fashion and portrait photographer, and is noted for his work with photograms, which he called "rayographs" in reference to himself.

== Biography ==
=== Background and early life ===
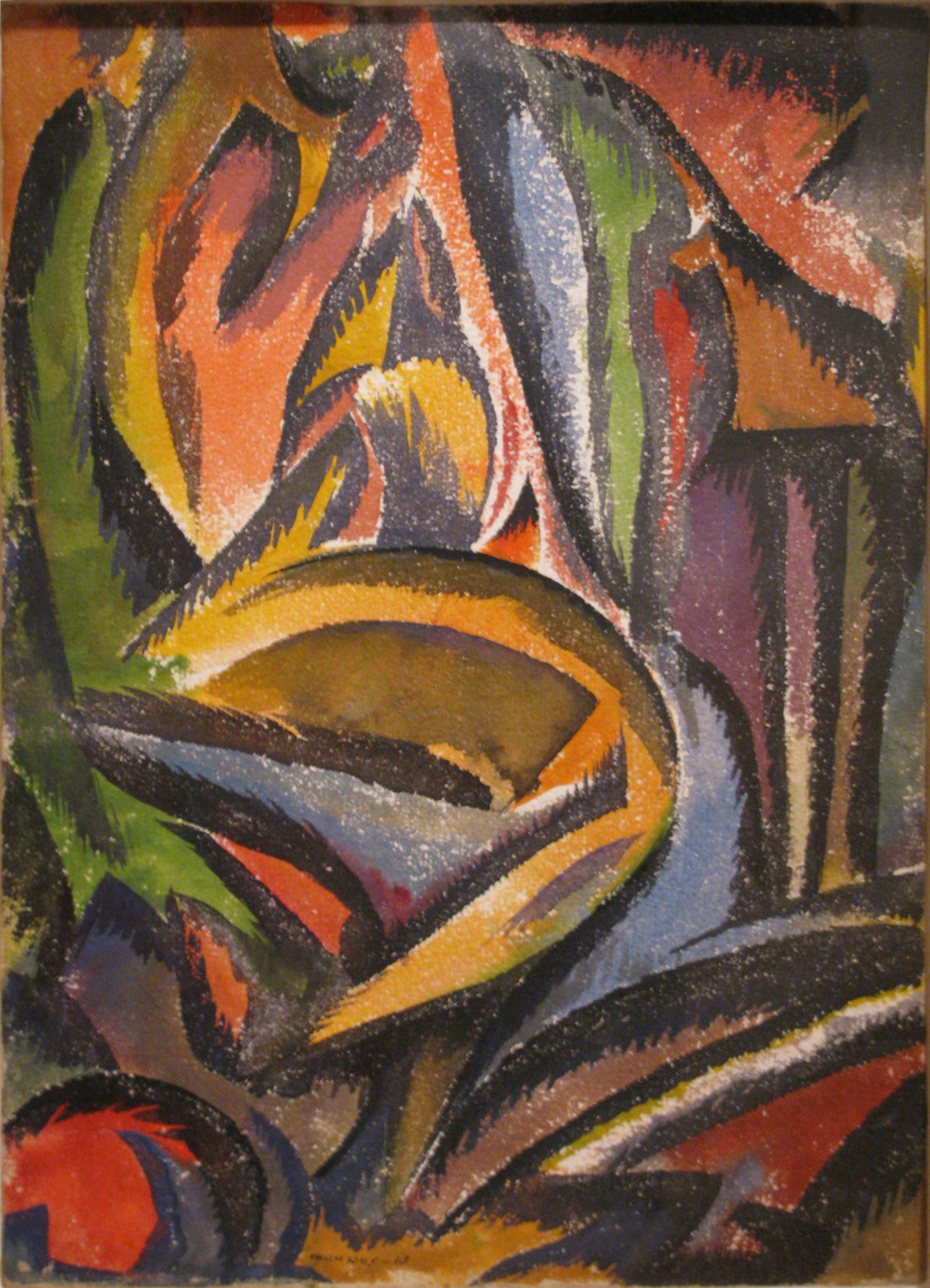
Man Ray, 1913, Landscape (Paysage Fauve), watercolor on paper, 35.2 x 24.6 cm, Smithsonian American Art Museum

During his career, Man Ray allowed few details of his early life or family background to be known to the public. He refused to acknowledge that he had a name other than Man Ray, and his 1963 autobiography Self-Portrait contains few dates.

Man Ray was born Emmanuel Radnitzky in South Philadelphia on August 27, 1890. He was the eldest child of Russian Jewish immigrants Melach "Max" Radnitzky, a tailor, and Manya "Minnie" Radnitzky (née Lourie or Luria). He had a brother, Sam, and two sisters, Dorothy "Dora" and Essie (or Elsie), the youngest born in 1897 shortly after they settled at 372 Debevoise St. in Williamsburg, Brooklyn. In early 1912, the Radnitzky family changed their surname to Ray; Sam chose this surname in reaction to the antisemitism prevalent at the time. Emmanuel, who was nicknamed "Manny", changed his first name to Man and gradually began to use Man Ray as his name.

Man Ray, c. 1921–1922, Rencontre dans la porte tournante, published on the cover (and page 39) of Der Sturm, Volume 13, Number 3, March 5, 1922

Man Ray's father worked in a garment factory and ran a small tailoring business out of the family home. He enlisted his children to assist him from an early age. Man Ray's mother enjoyed designing the family's clothes and inventing patchwork items from scraps of fabric. Man Ray wished to distance himself from his family background, but tailoring left an enduring mark on his art. Mannequins, flat irons, sewing machines, needles, pins, threads, swatches of fabric, and other items related to tailoring appear in much of his work, and art historians have noted similarities between Ray's collage and painting techniques and styles used for tailoring.

Mason Klein, curator of the exhibition Alias Man Ray: The Art of Reinvention at the Jewish Museum in New York, suggests that Man Ray may have been "the first Jewish avant-garde artist."

Man Ray was the uncle of the photographer Naomi Savage, who learned some of his techniques and incorporated them into her own work.

=== First artistic endeavors ===
Man Ray, 1919, Seguidilla, airbrushed gouache, pen & ink, pencil, and colored pencil on paperboard, 55.8 × 70.6 cm, Hirshhorn Museum and Sculpture Garden, Washington, D.C.

Man Ray displayed artistic and mechanical abilities during childhood. His education at Brooklyn's Boys' High School from 1904 to 1909 provided him with solid grounding in drafting and other basic art techniques. While he attended school, he educated himself with frequent visits to local art museums. After his graduation, Ray was offered a scholarship to study architecture but chose to pursue a career as an artist. Man Ray's parents were disappointed by his decision to pursue art, but they agreed to rearrange the family's modest living quarters so that Ray's room could be his studio. The artist remained in the family home over the next four years. During this time, he worked steadily towards becoming a professional painter. Man Ray earned money as a commercial artist and was a technical illustrator at several Manhattan companies.

The surviving examples of his work from this period indicate that he attempted mostly paintings and drawings in 19th-century styles. He was already an avid admirer of contemporary avant-garde art, such as the European modernists he saw at Alfred Stieglitz's 291 gallery and works by the Ashcan School. However, he was not yet able to integrate these trends into much of his own work. The art classes he sporadically attended, including stints at the National Academy of Design and the Art Students League, were of little apparent benefit to him. When he enrolled at the Ferrer Centre in the autumn of 1912, he began a period of intense and rapid artistic development. The centre, established and run by anarchists in memory of the executed Catalan anarchist educationalist Francisco Ferrer, provided classes in drawing and lectures on art-criticism. Anarchist writer Emma Goldman noted "a spirit of freedom in the art class which probably did not exist anywhere else in New York at that time" there. Man Ray exhibited works in the centre's 1912-13 group exhibition, with his painting A Study in Nudes reproduced in a review of the show in the centre's associated magazine The Modern School. This may have been his first published art work, and the magazine would go on to print his first published poem (Travail) in 1913. During this period he also contributed illustrations to radical publications, including providing the cover art for two 1914 issues of Goldman's journal Mother Earth.

Man Ray, 1920, The Coat-Stand (Porte manteau), reproduced in New York dada (magazine), Marcel Duchamp and Man Ray, April 1921

Man Ray, Lampshade, reproduced in 391, n. 13, July 1920

Man Ray, c. 1921–22, Dessin (Drawing), published on page 43 of Der Sturm, Volume 13, Number 3, March 5, 1922

Man Ray's work at this time was influenced by the avant-garde practices of European contemporary artists he was introduced to at the 1913 Armory Show. His early paintings display facets of cubism. After befriending Marcel Duchamp, who was interested in showing movement in static paintings, his works began to depict movement of the figures. An example is the repetitive positions of the dancer's skirts in The Rope Dancer Accompanies Herself with Her Shadows (1916).

In 1915, Man Ray had his first solo show of paintings and drawings after taking up residence at an art colony in Grantwood, New Jersey. His first proto-Dada object, an assemblage titled Self-Portrait, was exhibited the following year. He produced his first significant photographs in 1918, after initially picking up the camera to document his own artwork.

Man Ray abandoned conventional painting to involve himself with the radical Dada movement. He published two Dadaist periodicals, that each only had one issue, The Ridgefield Gazook (1915) and TNT (1919), the latter co-edited by Adolf Wolff and Mitchell Dawson. He started making objects and developed unique mechanical and photographic methods of making images. For the 1918 version of Rope Dancer, he combined a spray-gun technique with a pen drawing. Like Duchamp, he worked with readymades—ordinary objects that are selected and modified. His readymade The Gift (1921) is a flatiron with metal tacks attached to the bottom, and Enigma of Isidore Ducasse is an unseen object (a sewing machine) wrapped in cloth and tied with cord. Aerograph (1919), another work from this period, was done with airbrush on glass.

In 1920, Man Ray helped Duchamp make his Rotary Glass Plates, one of the earliest examples of kinetic art. It was composed of glass plates turned by a motor. That same year, Man Ray, Katherine Dreier, and Duchamp founded the Société Anonyme, an itinerant collection that was the first museum of modern art in the United States. In 1941, its collection was donated to the Yale University Art Gallery.

Man Ray teamed up with Duchamp to publish one issue of New York Dada in 1920. For Man Ray, Dada's experimentation was no match for the environment of New York; he wrote that "Dada cannot live in New York. All New York is dada, and will not tolerate a rival."

In 1913, Man Ray met his first wife, the Belgian poet Adon Lacroix (Donna Lecoeur) (1887–1975), in New York. They married in 1914, separated in 1919, and formally divorced in 1937.

=== Paris ===
Man Ray, 1922, Untitled Rayograph, gelatin silver photogram, 23.5 x 17.8 cm

In July 1921, Man Ray went to live and work in Paris, settling in the Montparnasse quarter favored by many artists. His accidental rediscovery of the cameraless photogram, which he called "rayographs", resulted in images hailed by Tristan Tzara as "pure Dada creations".

Shortly after arriving in Paris, he met and fell in love with Alice Prin (popularly known as "Kiki de Montparnasse"), an artists' model and celebrated character in Paris bohemian circles. Prin was Man Ray's companion for most of the 1920s, and became the subject of some of his most famous photographic images. She also starred in his experimental films Le Retour à la raison and L'Étoile de mer.

In 1929, he began a love affair with the Surrealist photographer Lee Miller. She was also his photographic assistant and, together, they reinvented the photographic technique of solarization. Miller left him in 1932.

From late 1934 until August 1940, Man Ray was in a relationship with French art model Ady Fidelin, who appeared in many of his photographs. When Ray fled Nazi-occupied France, Adrienne chose to stay behind to care for her family. Unlike the artist's other significant muses, Fidelin had until 2022 largely been written out of his life story.

Man Ray was a pioneering photographer in Paris for two decades between the wars. Many significant members of the art world, including Tzara, Pablo Picasso, James Joyce, Gertrude Stein, Jean Cocteau, Salvador Dalí, Peggy Guggenheim, Alice Rahon, Bridget Bate Tichenor, Luisa Casati, and Antonin Artaud, posed for his camera. His international fame as a portrait photographer is reflected in a series of photographs of Maharaja of Indore Yashwant Rao Holkar II and his wife Sanyogita Devi from their 1927 visit to Europe. In the winter of 1933, surrealist artist Méret Oppenheim, known for her fur-covered teacup, posed nude for Man Ray in a well-known series of photographs depicting her standing next to a printing press.

His practice of photographing African art in the Paris collections of Paul Guillaume and Charles Ratton and others led to several iconic photographs, including Noire et blanche. As Man Ray scholar Wendy A. Grossman has illustrated, "no one was more influential in translating the vogue for African art into a Modernist photographic aesthetic than Man Ray."

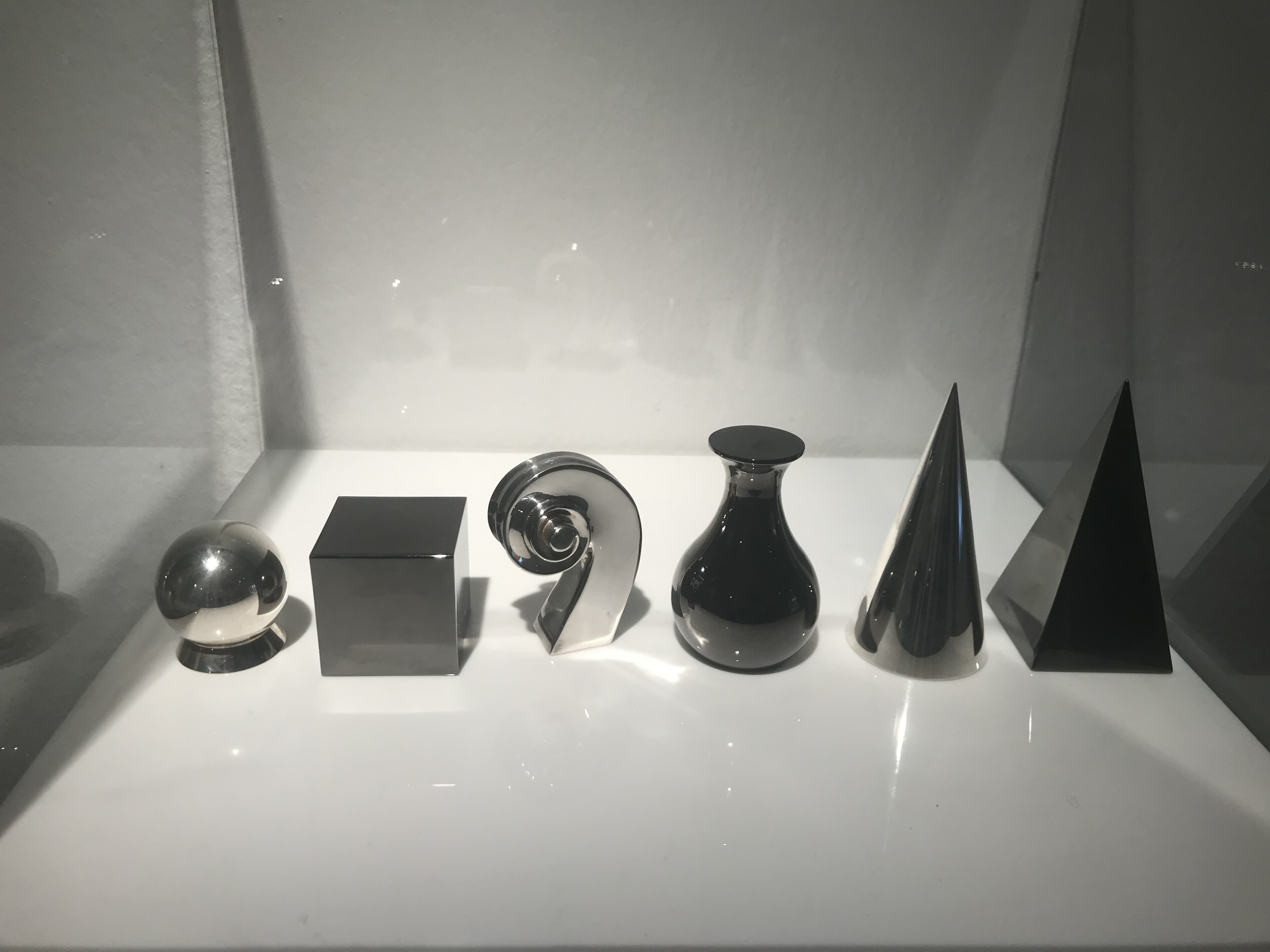
Chess Set by Man Ray

Man Ray was represented in the first Surrealist exhibition with Jean Arp, Giorgio de Chirico, Max Ernst, Georges Malkine, André Masson, Joan Miró, and Pablo Picasso at the Galerie Pierre in Paris in 1925. Important works from this time were a metronome with an eye, originally titled Object to Be Destroyed, and the Violon d'Ingres, a photograph of Kiki de Montparnasse with f-holes superimposed on her back, inspired by Jean-Auguste-Dominique Ingres. Violon d'Ingres is a popular example of how Man Ray could juxtapose disparate elements in his photography to generate meaning.

Man Ray directed a number of influential avant-garde short films, known as Cinéma Pur. He directed Le Retour à la Raison (2 mins, 1923); Emak-Bakia (16 mins, 1926); L'Étoile de Mer (15 mins, 1928); and Les Mystères du Château de Dé (27 mins, 1929). Man Ray also assisted Marcel Duchamp with the cinematography of his film Anemic Cinema (1926), and Ray personally manned the camera on Fernand Léger's Ballet Mécanique (1924). In René Clair's film Entr'acte (1924), Man Ray appeared in a brief scene playing chess with Duchamp. Duchamp, Man Ray, and Francis Picabia were all friends and collaborators, connected by their experimental, entertaining, and innovative art.

=== Hollywood ===
The Second World War forced Man Ray to return to the United States. He lived in Los Angeles from 1940 to 1951, where he focused his creative energy on painting. One of his residences was the Chateau des Fleurs, another was Villa Elaine Apartments, both in Hollywood. A few days after arriving in Los Angeles, he met Juliet Browner, a first-generation American of Romanian-Jewish lineage. She was a trained dancer who studied dance with Martha Graham, and an experienced artists' model. They married in 1946 in a double wedding with their friends Max Ernst and Dorothea Tanning; Browner took the name "Juliet Man Ray". They were also close friends with Black Dahlia suspect George Hodel and his second wife Dorothy Harvey (also known as Dorero). George Hodel's son Steve Hodel even proposes that the staging of the murder was an homage to Man Ray's surrealist creations. In 1948 Ray had a solo exhibition at the Copley Galleries in Beverly Hills, which brought together a wide array of work and featured his newly painted canvases of the Shakespearean Equations series.

=== Later life ===
Man Ray returned to Paris in 1951, and settled with Juliet into a studio at 2 bis rue Férou near the Jardin du Luxembourg, where he continued his creative practice across mediums. During the last quarter century of his life, he returned to a number of his iconic earlier works, recreating them in new form. He also directed the production of limited-edition replicas of several of his objects, working first with Marcel Zerbib and later Arturo Schwarz.

In 1963, he published his autobiography, Self-Portrait (republished in 1999).

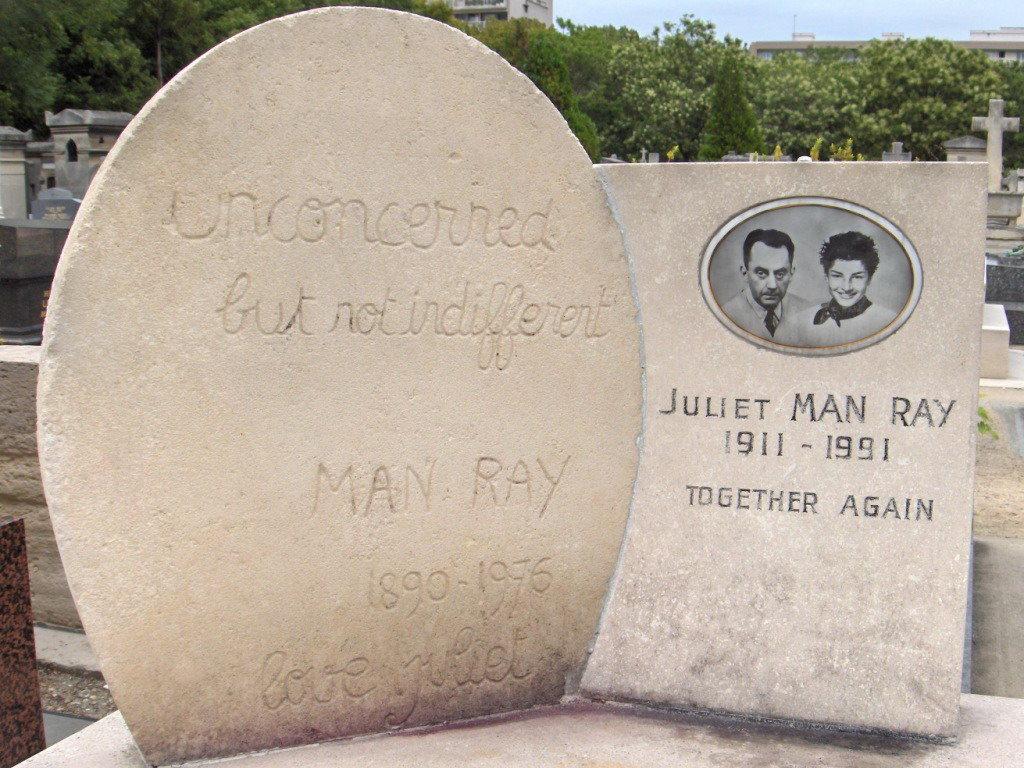
The grave of Juliet and Man Ray in Paris

Ray continued to work on new paintings, photographs, collages and art objects until his death from a lung infection on November 18, 1976. He was interred in the Cimetière du Montparnasse in Paris; his epitaph reads "Unconcerned, but not indifferent".

When Juliet died in 1991, she was interred in the same tomb. Her epitaph reads "Together again". The grave site has now fallen into disrepair and the memorial stone is removed or missing. Juliet organized a trust for Ray's work and donated much of his work to museums. Her plans to restore the studio as a public museum proved too expensive; such was the structure's disrepair. Most of its contents were stored at the Centre Pompidou museum in Paris.

== Innovations ==
Man Ray was responsible for several technical innovations in modern art, filmmaking, and photography. These included his use of photograms to produce surrealist images he called "rayographs", and solarization (rediscovered with Lee Miller). His 1923 experimental film Le Retour à la raison was the first 'cine-rayograph', a motion picture made without the use of a camera. Ray's 1935 Space Writing (Self-Portrait) was the first light painting, predating Picasso's 1949 light paintings, photographed by Gjon Mili, by fourteen years.

== Accolades ==
In 1974, Man Ray received the Royal Photographic Society's Progress Medal and Honorary Fellowship "in recognition of any invention, research, publication or other contribution which has resulted in an important advance in the scientific or technological development of photography or imaging in the widest sense." In 1999, ARTnews magazine named Man Ray one of the 25 most influential artists of the 20th century. The publication cited his groundbreaking photography, "his explorations of film, painting, sculpture, collage, assemblage and prototypes of what would eventually be called performance art and conceptual art." ARTnews further stated that "Man Ray offered artists in all media an example of a creative intelligence that, in its 'pursuit of pleasure and liberty', unlocked every door it came to and walked freely where it would."

== Art market ==
In 2022, Man Ray's Le Violon d'Ingres (1924), a photograph depicting Alice Prin's nude back overlaid with a violin's f-holes, sold for $12.4 million, setting a world record as the most expensive photograph ever to be sold at auction. The sale came after a drawn-out bidding period that lasted nearly ten minutes during Christie's New York's auction dedicated to Surrealist art.

On November 9, 2017, his Noire et Blanche (1926), formerly in the collection of Jacques Doucet, was purchased at Christie's Paris for €2,688,750 (US$3,120,658), becoming (at that time) the 14th most expensive photograph to ever sell at auction. This was a record not only for Man Ray's work in the photographic medium but also for the sale at auction of any vintage photograph.

Only two other works by Man Ray in any medium have commanded more at auction than the price captured by the 2017 sale of Noire et blanche. His 1916 canvas Promenade sold for $5,877,000 on November 6, 2013, at the Sotheby's New York Impressionist & Modern Art Sale. And on November 13, 2017, his assemblage titled Catherine Barometer (1920), sold for $3,252,500 at Christie's in New York.

== Legacy ==
Ray's autobiography Self-Portrait was republished in 1999.

Tom Cordier played Man Ray in the 2011 film Midnight in Paris.

In 2012, American dream pop band Cigarettes After Sex used Man Ray's 1930 photograph 'Anatomies' as the cover for their EP 'I.'. The photo features Lee Miller's neck with her head thrown back. In 2015, they used another photo of Ray's; 'Plume', depicting a feather, for the cover of 'Affection', one of their singles.

In March 2013, Man Ray's photograph Noire et Blanche (1926) was featured in the United States Postal Service's "Modern Art in America" series of stamps.

In 2025, Irish actor Frank Bourke played Man Ray in the Belgian television series This Is Not a Murder Mystery.

Man Ray, 1920, Three Heads (Joseph Stella and Marcel Duchamp, painting bust portrait of Man Ray above Duchamp), gelatin silver print, 20.7 x 15.7 cm, Museum of Modern Art, New York

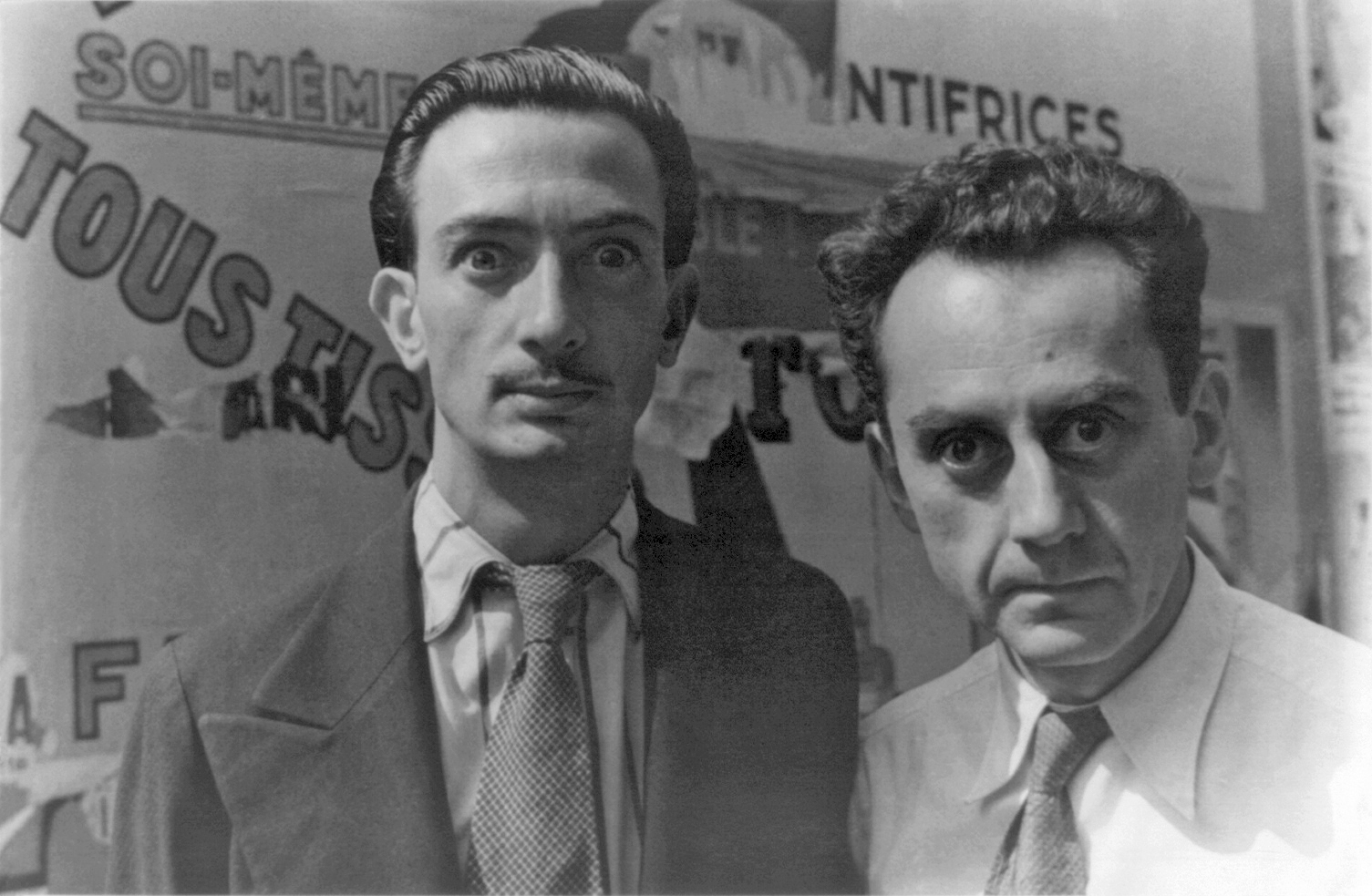
Salvador Dalí and Man Ray in Paris, on June 16, 1934, making "wild eyes" for photographer Carl Van Vechten

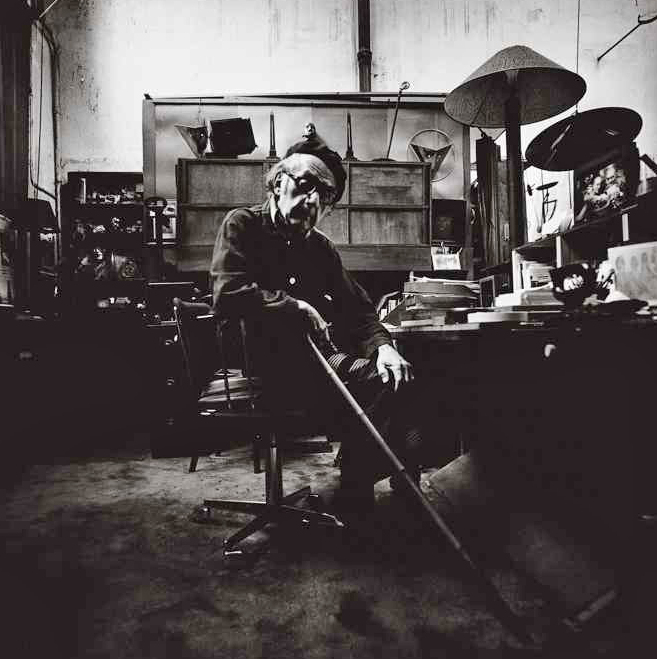
Man Ray, Paris, 1975, photographed by Lothar Wolleh

== Selected publications ==
- Man Ray and Tristan Tzara (1922). Champs délicieux: album de photographies. Paris: [Société générale d'imprimerie et d'édition].
- Man Ray (1926). Revolving doors, 1916–1917: 10 planches. Paris: Éditions Surrealistes.
- Man Ray (1934). Man Ray: photographs, 1920–1934, Paris. Hartford, Connecticut: James Thrall Soby.
- Éluard, Paul, and Man Ray (1935). Facile. Paris: Éditions G.L.M.
- Man Ray and André Breton (1937). La photographie n'est pas l'art. Paris: Éditions G.L.M.
- Man Ray and Paul Éluard (1937). Les mains libres: dessins. Paris: Éditions Jeanne Bucher.
- Man Ray (1948). Alphabet for adults. Beverly Hills, California: Copley Galleries.
- Man Ray (1963). Self portrait. London: Andre Deutsch.
- Man Ray and L. Fritz Gruber (1963). Portraits. Gütersloh, Germany: Sigbert Mohn Verlag.
