= Julien Mandel =

French photographer

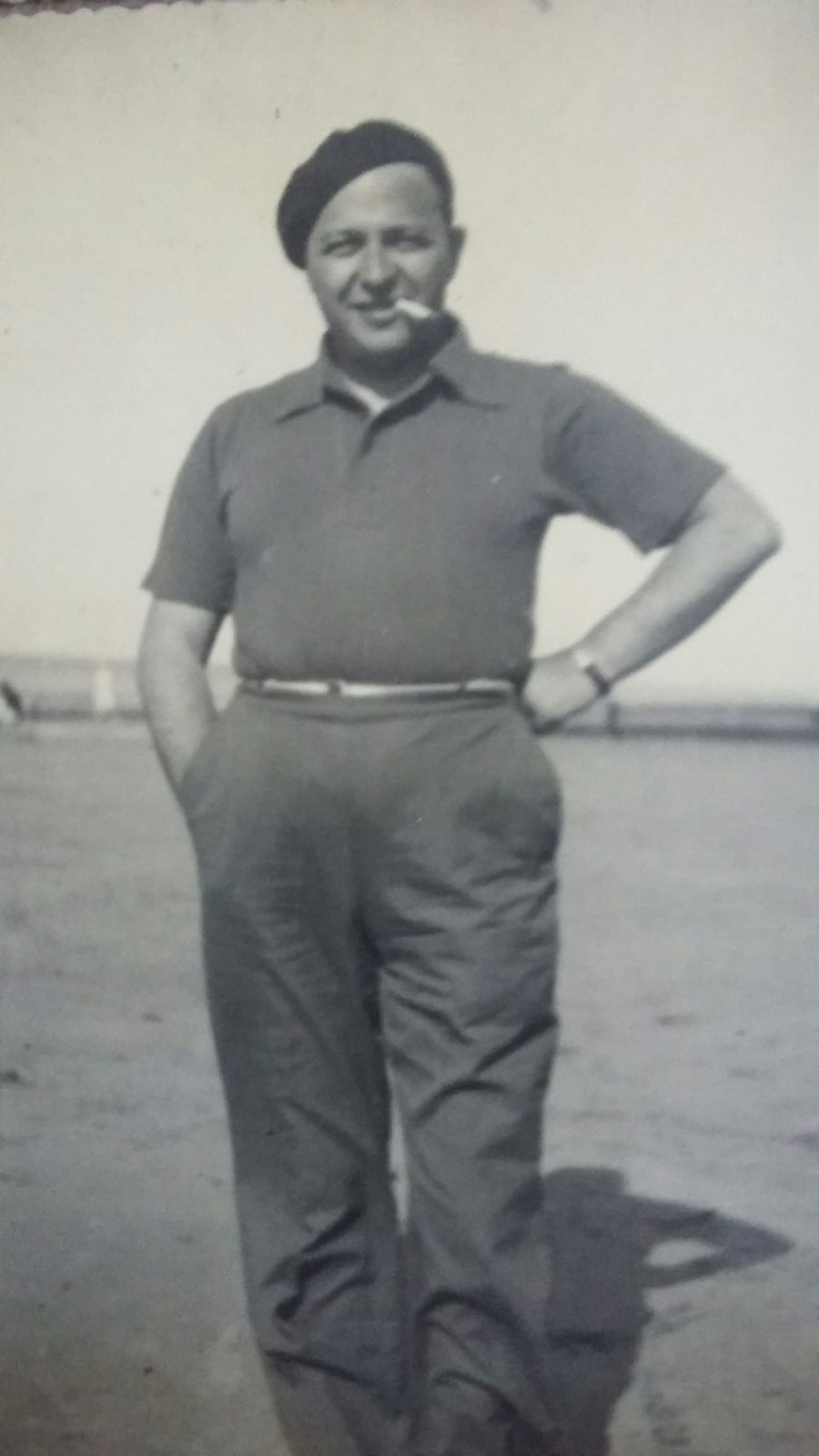
- Born: 1 January 1893; Poland
- Died: 24 September 1961 (aged 68); Recife
- Occupation: Photographer

Julien Mandel (1893 – 1961) was a Jewish photographer and filmmaker. He was one of the best-known commercial photographers of female nudes of the early twentieth century. He worked in Paris and his signature photography became known in the 1910s and was published through the mid-1930s by such firms as Armand Noyer, Les Studios, P-C Paris, and the Neue Photographische Gesellschaft.

== Photographic work ==
He produced erotic postcards. The models often are found in highly arranged classical poses, and were photographed in-studio and outdoors. The images are artfully composed with exquisite tones and soft lighting— showing a particular texture created by light rather than shadow.

Reportedly, Mandel was a member of, and participated in, the German avant-garde "new age outdoor" or "plein air" movement. Numerous pictures sold under this name feature natural settings, playing on the ultra pale, uniform skin tones of the women set against the roughness of nature.

The nude photographs were marketed in a postcard-sized format, but as A Brief History of Postcards explains: "A majority of the French nude postcards were called postcards because of the size. They were never meant to be postally sent. It was illegal to send such images in the post (see History of erotic photography). The size enabled them to be placed readily into jacket pockets, packages, and books.

J. Mandel usually appears on the front of these card-sized photographs, being one of the few photographers of the day to stamp or sign a name on the front of works. Large numbers were sold.

Julian (Julien) Mandel has been compared to Stanisław Julian Ignacy Ostroróg who also created "plein-air" and exquisite deco-style nudes in the 1920s.

== Personal life ==
Julien Mandel was born in Poland as Julian Mandelbaum. He was married in France to Marie Lefebvre, they had a son named Jacques Marcel. In 1935, Julien Mandel left France permanently and went to live in Brazil. With George Mandel-Mantelo, Harry Baur and others he was helping Jews from France to migrate to the United States, Argentina, Uruguay, Venezuela, Bolivia and other countries, especially Brazil. In Brazil he raised a new family, marrying Maria de Lourdes Brochier Medeiros, their children were Neli Elisabeth Medeiros Mandel, António Sérgio Medeiros Mandel and Sílvia Mônica Medeiros Mandel. Julien Mandel concealed being a Jew, certainly to help Jews escape the Nazis.

== Gallery ==
circa 1920

circa 1925

== Family photographs ==
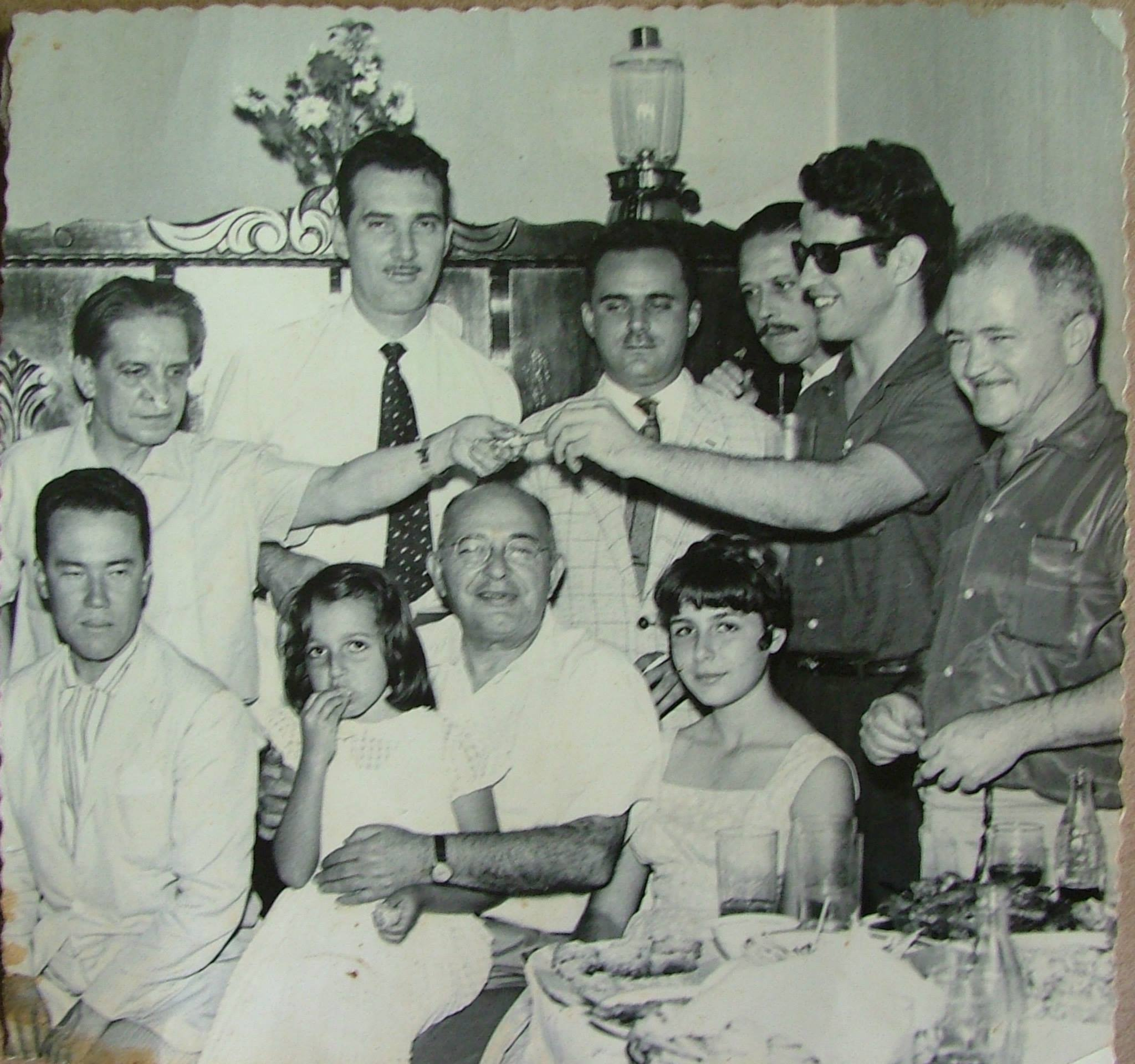
Family photo

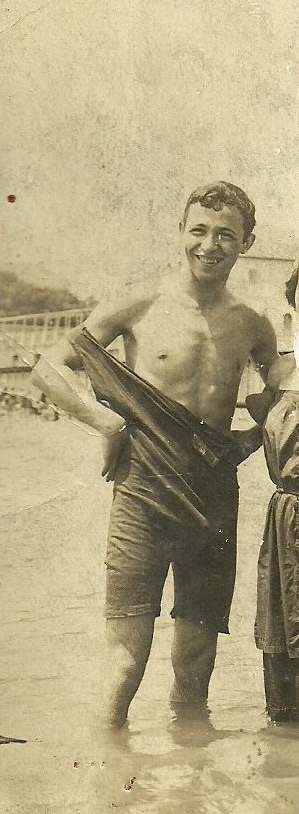

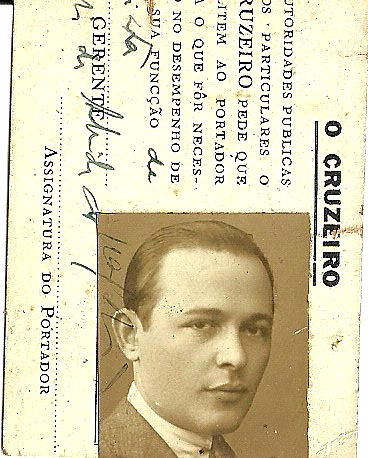
Julian Mandel

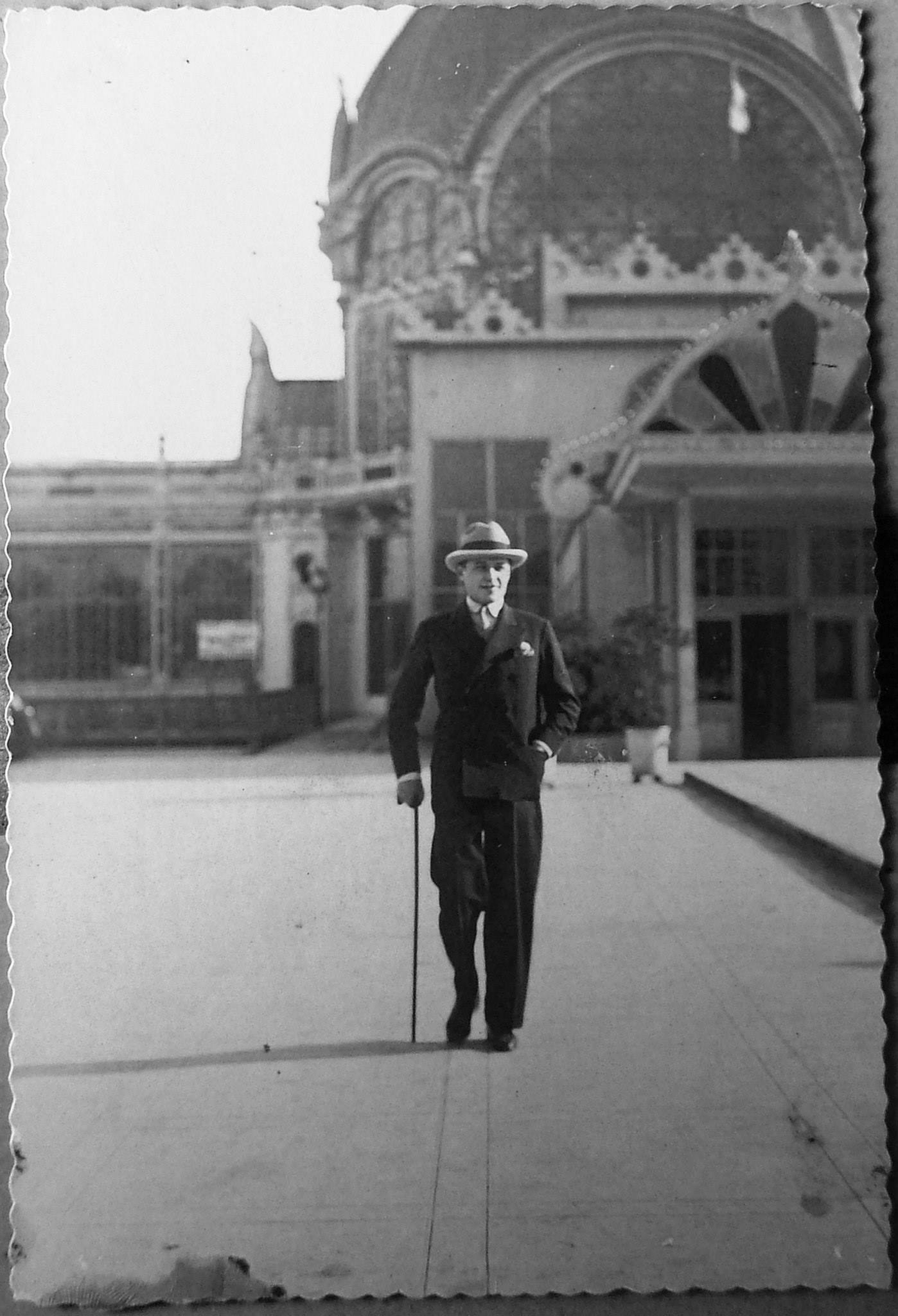

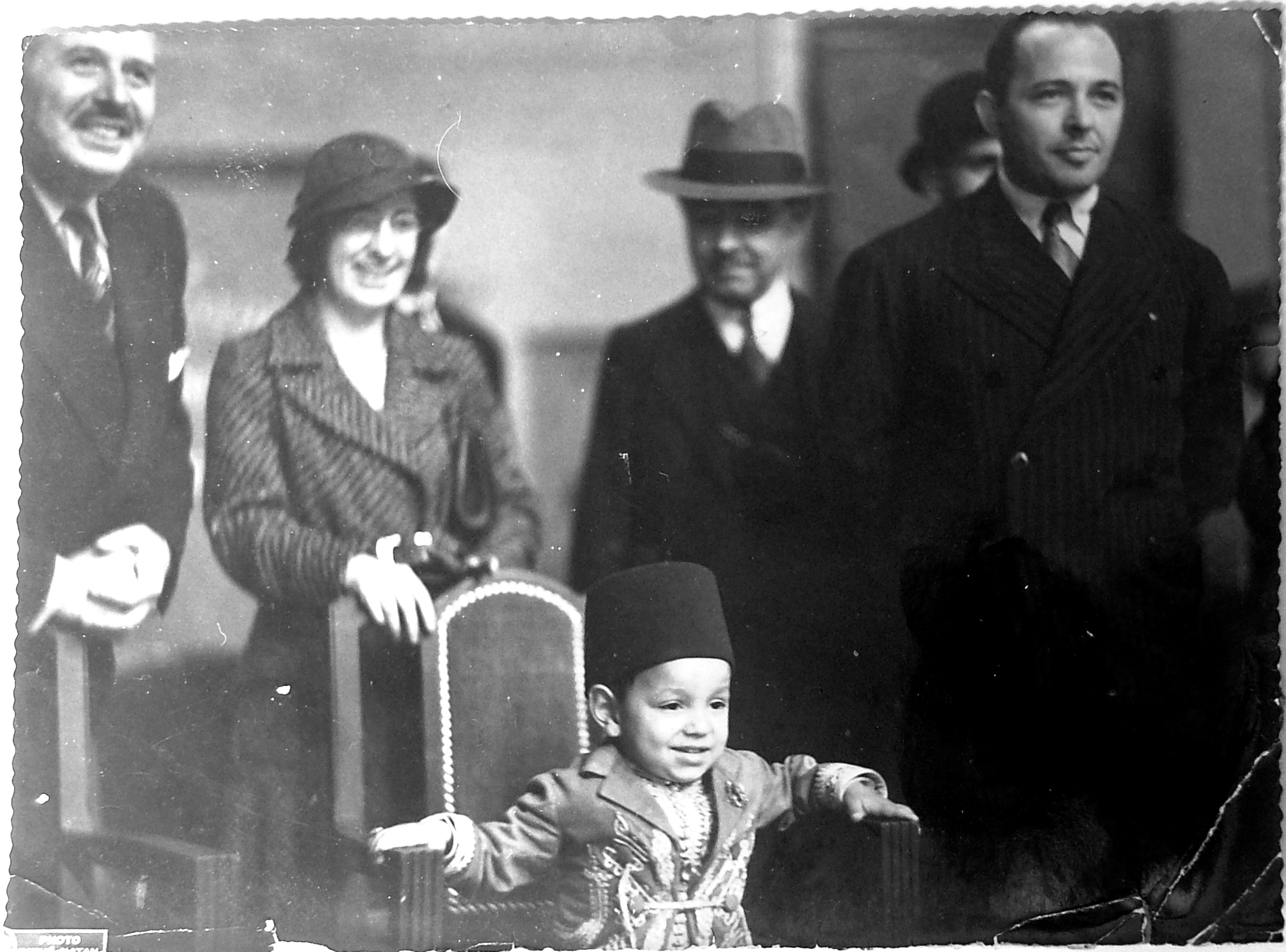

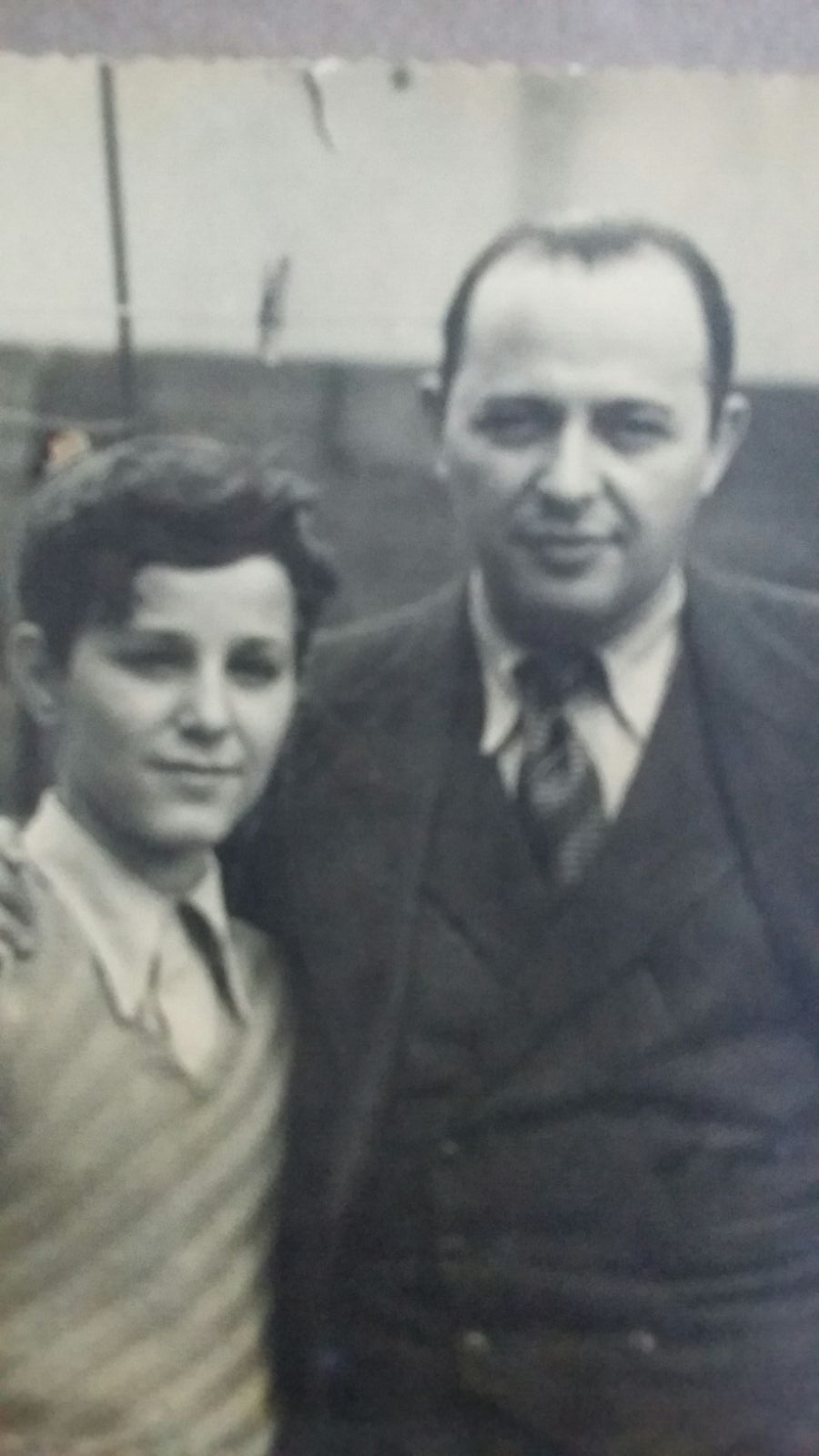
Jacques Marcel Mandelbaum

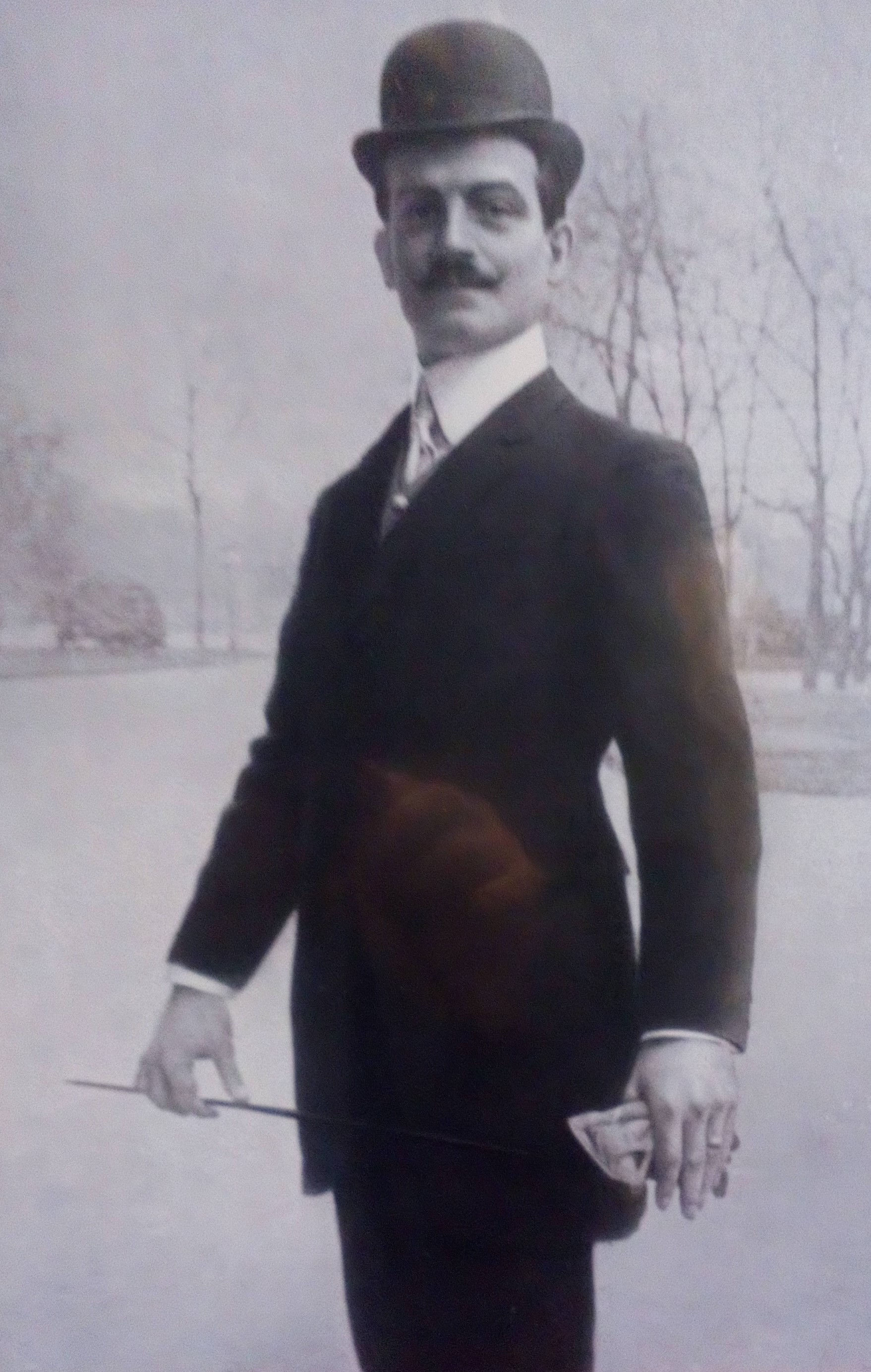
Eugéne Lefebvre - friend of Julien Mandel

== See also ==
- Rudolf Koppitz
- Alice Prin
- History of erotic photography
