= Juliet Man Ray =

Wife of Man Ray (1911–1991)

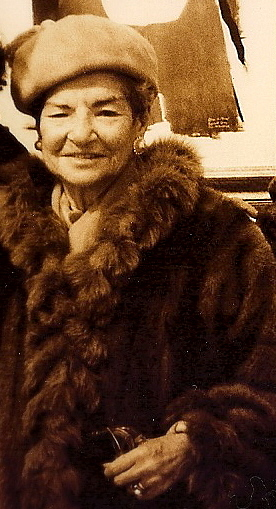
Juliet Man Ray

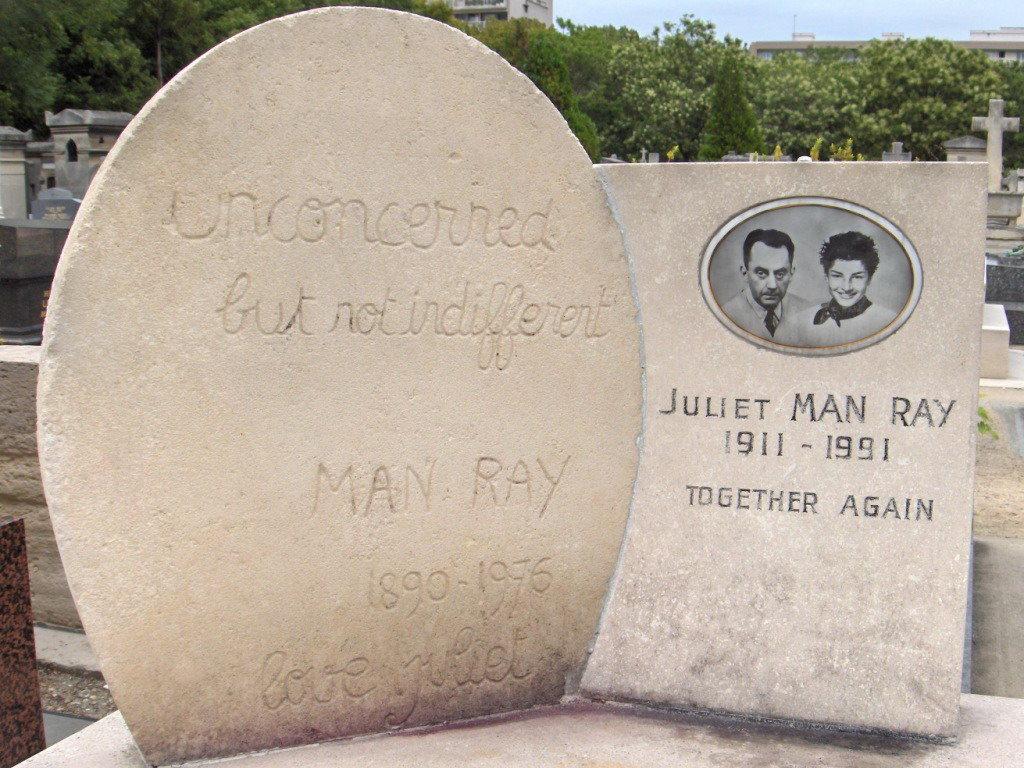
Funerary monument, Montparnasse Cemetery

Juliet Man Ray (born Juliet Browner; 1911 – January 17, 1991) was an American dancer and model, who became the wife and muse of the artist Man Ray.

== Biography ==
=== Early life ===
Ray was born Juliet Browner, the daughter of Henry Browner, who had emigrated from Romania and later graduated from the Brooklyn College of Pharmacy now known as LIU Pharmacy (the Arnold and Marie Schwartz College of Pharmacy and Health Sciences). She graduated from James Monroe High School and then studied dance with Martha Graham, before becoming a model.

=== Career ===
She worked as an art model, often for Abstract Expressionist painters, and at the age of 30 moved to Los Angeles, to try to start a movie career.

=== Marriage ===
She first met the artist Man Ray in a Los Angeles nightclub. Man Ray later described the meeting:

After dinner we went to a night club where some of the best jazz of the period was being played. We danced. Juliet was like a feather in my arms.

In 1946, she married Man Ray, in a double wedding with their friends Max Ernst and Dorothea Tanning. From 1951, they lived in a studio in Paris near the Luxembourg Gardens until his death in 1976 at the age of 86.

=== Death ===
She is buried at Paris's Montparnasse Cemetery, alongside her husband.
