= Samuel Putnam =

American scholar and translator (1892–1950)

- Born: October 10, 1892; Rossville, Illinois, U.S.
- Died: January 15, 1950 (aged 57); Lambertville, New Jersey, U.S.
- Occupation: Translator

Samuel Putnam (October 10, 1892 – January 15, 1950) was an American translator and scholar of Romance languages. He authored Paris Was Our Mistress, a memoir on writers and artists associated with the American ex-patriate community in Paris in the 1920s and early 1930s.

== Work ==
Putnam's most famous work is his 1949 English translation of Miguel de Cervantes' Don Quixote. It is the first version of the work in contemporary English; archaic language remains, but less than in earlier English versions.

The language is formal when spoken by educated characters, but seldom old-fashioned, while the peasant characters speak in colloquial modern English. Putnam worked on the translation for 12 years. He also published a companion volume, The Portable Cervantes, which included an abridged version of his translation, in addition to English versions of two of Cervantes' Novelas ejemplares.

Daniel Eisenberg, comparing translations of Don Quixote, called Putnam's translation the most "sensitive" and by far the best documented.

Putnam's complete translation, originally published by Viking Press, was reprinted in the Modern Library, and has seldom been out of print. Putnam also translated Rabelais. He was known for his leftist leanings and was a columnist for the communist Daily Worker.

Putnam was the father of the American philosopher Hilary Putnam. Hilary Putnam made his first published appearance in his father's Don Quixote translation, in a footnote explaining a joke from the text in terms of logic.

Putnam died in 1950 at the age of 57 in his home in New Jersey.

== Bibliography ==
- Don Quixote de la Mancha translated by Samuel Putnam, with a "Translator's Introduction" by Mr. Putnam (New York: Modern Library, 1998).
- The Works of Aretino: Letters and Sonnets: Translated into English from the original Italian, with a critical and biographical essay by Samuel Putnam (New York: Covici-Friede Publishers, 1926, 1933). This book includes Pietro Aretino: A Biography Translated from the Italian of Francesco de Sanctis by Samuel Putnam.
- The Works of Aretino: Dialogues: Translated into English from the original Italian, with a critical and biographical essay by Samuel Putnam (New York: Covici-Friede Publishers, 1926, 1933). This book includes Pietro Aretino: Poison-Flower of the Renaissance: A Critical and Biographical Study. It also includes The Courtezan [La Cortigiana] by Aretino.
