= Lucy Krohg =

French model, artist, gallerist (1891–1977)

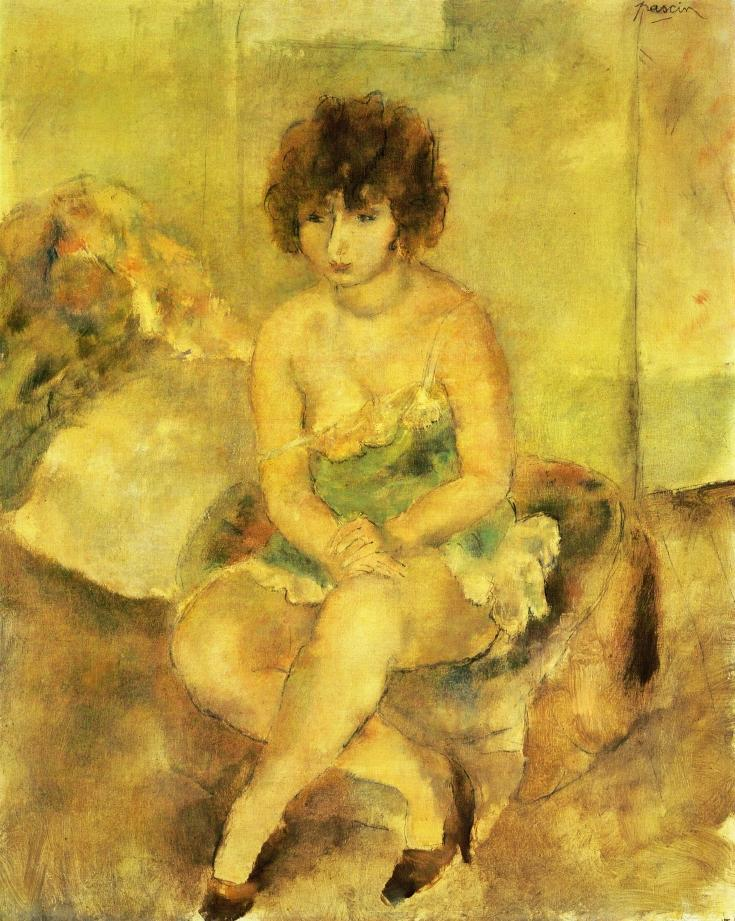
- "Lucy Krohg", c. 1925, oil painting by Jules Pascin. The hairstyle denotes a young Vidil.
- Born: Cécile Marie Vidil; 6 April 1891; Paris, France
- Died: 17 August 1977 (aged 86)
- Other name: Lucy Vidil
- Occupations: Model, visual artist, gallerist, dancer
- Spouse: Per Krohg (m. 1915; div. 1934)
- Partner: Jules Pascin
- Children: Guy Krohg

Lucy Krohg (née Cécile Marie Vidil; 6 April 1891 – 17 August 1977) was a French model, artist, dancer, and gallerist.

== Early life and family ==
Cécile Marie Vidil was born on 6 April 1891, in Paris. She was the daughter of Cécile Vidil (née Jampa) and baker François Victor Vidil (d. 1938).

An independent teen, she entered the circle of artists gathered around Montparnasse and Montmartre and was a model for Henri Matisse and Albert Marquet. In 1909, she met Jules Pascin and posed for him in the first representations of her to be found and, as would be with Pascin, a brief intimate relationship occurred starting in 1910. By 1910 she was the most favored model at the Académie Matisse the students founding her a perfect muse for their work. During one of the evenings on the dance floor at Bal Bullier, she came in closer contact with one student from the Académie Matisse, Per Krohg.

Per Krohg was known not only for his artistic work, but completed several dance courses and was a dance floor master. Beginning that evening the couple found themselves inseparable. Signifying her new-found union, the young lady in a radical cut of her hair established a distinctive style to be hers for the rest of her life. The couple were married on 21 December 1915, and in 1917 Lucy gave birth to a son, Guy.

== Later life ==
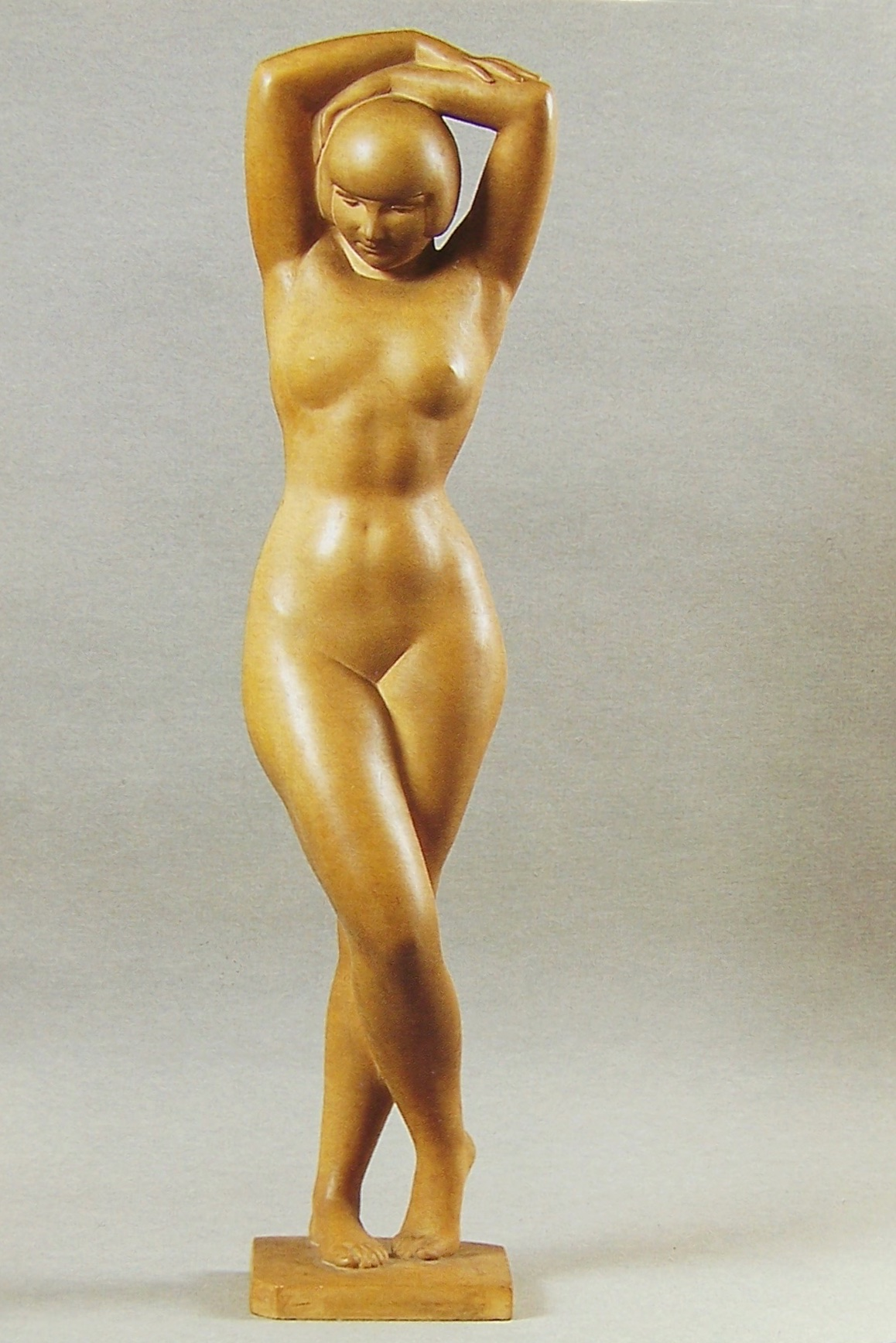
"Lucy Krogh", by Cecil Howard 1920, identical in image as she was to students at the Matisse Academy

Pascin left Paris in 1914 with his fiancée Hermine David, and married her in 1918. He returned to Paris in the autumn of 1920 and in the spring of 1921 sought a return to his former intimacy, however brief it was, with the now married Lucy Krohg. In the summer of 1921, Per Krohg left for Norway for a painting plein-air workshop, and Pascin and Hermine David's relationship ended in separation. Lucy was committed to her marriage, but was strongly habitual in supporting Pascin, who had become dependent on alcohol and threatened to commit suicide. Lucy led a double life, maintaining her own ménage and looking after Pascin. This situation lasted for three years. In 1924, Krohg took his son away. In 1927 Pascin was threatened with the loss of American citizenship and was forced to live in New York for at least one year. Yet five months after his departure, Hermine David joined him. Together, they returned to Europe and travelled to Spain and Portugal, and then found themselves in Paris. Pascin already suffered from depression and was an alcoholic. On 5 June 1930, when his own solo exhibition was to be opened, he committed suicide in his studio. First, he cut his wrists and wrote Adieu Lucy on the wall with blood and then he hanged himself. The body was discovered three days later by Krohg. After the opening of his will, it was discovered that Pascin had shared his estate between his wife, Hermine David, and Lucy.

Lucy's marriage had not really existed for many years, the official divorce from Per Krohg only taking place in 1934, when he wished to marry another woman. In later years, Krohg's name appeared periodically while exhibiting Pascin's works, as half of the collection remained in her possession. In 1932 established her own gallery based on it, Galerie Lucy Krohg, at 10bis place Saint-Augustin, in the 8th arrondissement. Her gallery remained open for 40 years.

Krohg died on 17 August 1977, in Paris at the age of 86.
