= Jules Pascin =

American, Jewish painter

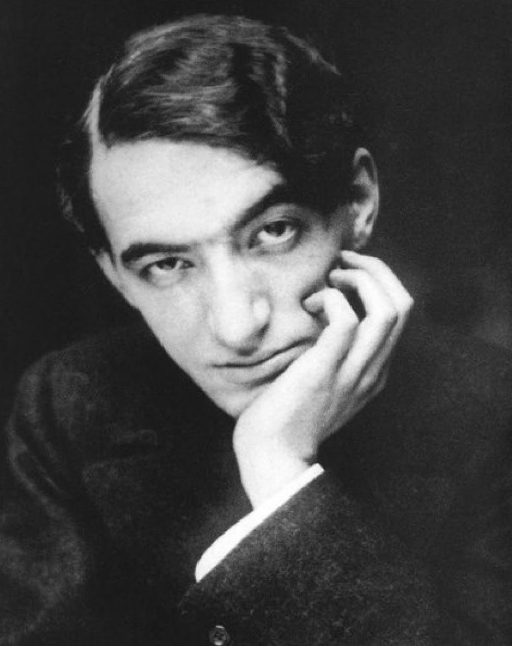
- Pascin in 1910
- Born: March 31, 1885; Vidin, Bulgaria
- Died: June 2, 1930 (aged 45); Paris, France
- Resting place: cimetière du Montparnasse
- Education: Moritz Heymann's academy, Académie Colarossi, Académie Matisse
- Movement: École de Paris, Expressionism
- Spouse: Hermine David (m. 1917–1920)
- Partner: Lucy Krohg

Julius Mordecai Pincas (March 31, 1885 – June 2, 1930), known as Pascin (French: [pas.kin], erroneously [pas.kɛ̃] or [pa.sɛ̃]), Jules Pascin, also known as the "Prince of Montparnasse", was a Bulgarian artist of the School of Paris, known for his paintings and drawings. He later became an American citizen. His most frequent subject was women, depicted in casual poses, usually nude or partly dressed.

Pascin was educated in Vienna and Munich. He traveled for a time in the United States, spending most of his time in the South. He is best known as a Parisian painter, who associated with the artistic circles of Montparnasse, and was one of the emigres of the School of Paris. Having struggled with depression and alcoholism, he died by suicide at the age of 45.

== Early life ==
Julius Mordecai Pincas was born in Vidin, Bulgaria, the eighth of eleven children, to the Sephardic Jewish family of a grain merchant named Marcus Pincas. Originally from the city of Ruse, the Pincas family was one of the wealthiest in Vidin; they bought and exported wheat, rice, maize and sunflower. His mother, Sofie (Sophie) Pincas, belonged to a Sephardic family, Russo, which had moved from Trieste to Zemun, where she and her husband lived before moving to Vidin and where their older children were born.

The family spoke Judaeo-Spanish at home. In 1892, he moved with his parents to Bucharest, where his father opened a grain company, "Marcus Pincas & Co". Pascin worked briefly for his father's firm at the age of fifteen, but also frequented a local brothel where he made his earliest drawings. His first artistic training was in Vienna in 1902 at age seventeen. In 1903 he relocated to Munich, where he studied at Moritz Heymann's academy. There he got in touch with Paul Klee, Alfred Kubin and Wassily Kandinsky. In 1905 he began contributing drawings to Simplicissimus, a satirical magazine published in Munich. Because his father objected to the family name being associated with these drawings, the 20-year-old artist adopted the pseudonym Pascin (an anagram of Pincas) with his father's permission. He continued to contribute drawings to a Munich daily until 1929.

=== Paris ===
In December 1905, Pascin moved to Paris, becoming part of the great migration of artists to that city at the start of the 20th century. There he was welcome by "Les Dômiers" the regular customers of Cafe le Dome. The Dômiers introduced Pascin to Hermine David in 1907. She was also a painter and at the time a student in the Académie Julian and student of Jean-Paul Laurens. The two became lovers. In that same year Pascin had his first solo exhibition at Paul Cassirer Gallery in Berlin. Despite his social life, Pascin created thousands of watercolors and sketches, plus drawings and caricatures that he sold to various newspapers and magazines. In 1908, Pascin began to study in the Académie Matisse. Pascin would visit the Louvre, taking a special interest in the masters of the 18th century especially Greuze, Boucher, Watteau and Fragonard.

He exhibited his works in commercial galleries and in the Salon d'Automne, the Salon des Indépendants, and the exhibitions of the Berlin Secession and at the Sonderbund-Ausstellung in Cologne. Between 1905 and 1914 he exhibited drawings, watercolors, and prints, but rarely paintings. It was not until about 1907–1909 that he produced his first paintings, which were portraits and nudes in a style influenced by Fauvism and Cézanne. Around 1911, Pascin persuaded Aïcha Goblet to become his artists' model. She sat exclusively for him for around a year, before working with other artists and they stayed good friends until his death.

Pascin wanted to become a serious painter, but in time he became deeply depressed over his inability to achieve critical success with his efforts. Dissatisfied with his slow progress in the new medium, he studied the art of drawing at the Académie Colarossi, and painted copies after the masters in the Louvre. He exhibited in the United States for the first time in 1913, when twelve of his works were shown at the Armory Show in New York.

Pascin relocated to London at the outbreak of World War I to avoid service in the Bulgarian army and left for the United States on October 3, 1914. On October 31, Hermine David sailed for the United States to join him.

== United States ==
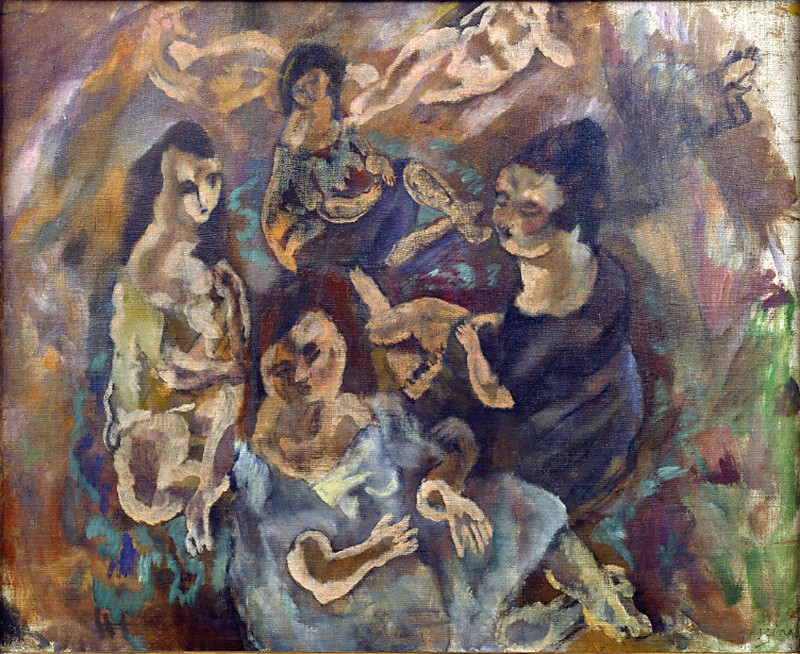
Les petites américaines (Little American Girls), 1916, oil on canvas, Paris Museum of Jewish Art and History

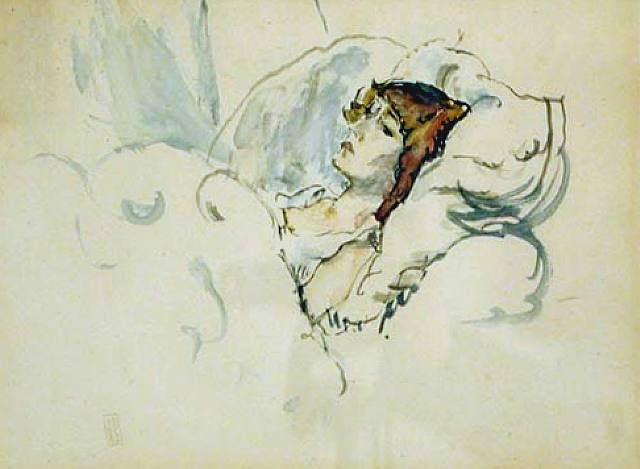
Hermine in Bed, watercolor

Pascin and David lived in the United States from 1914 to 1920, sitting out World War I. They visited New York City, where David had an exhibit. Pascin frequented nightclubs, and met artists such as Yasuo Kuniyoshi, Gaston Lachaise and Guy Pène du Bois, but most of his time in America was spent traveling throughout the South. He also visited Cuba. He made many drawings of street life in Charleston, New Orleans, and other places he visited. Some of his works of 1915 and 1916 are in a Cubist style, which he soon abandoned.

In 1918 Pascin married Hermine David at City Hall in New York City. Their witnesses were Max Weber and Maurice Sterne, friends and painters who both lived in New York. In September 1920, Pascin became a naturalized United States citizen, with support from Alfred Stieglitz and Maurice Sterne, but returned to Paris soon afterward. There he began a relationship with Lucy Vidil Krohg, who had been his lover ten years earlier but had married the Norwegian painter Per Krohg during Pascin's years in America.

Especially after he returned to France, he became the symbol of the Montparnasse artistic community and is more associated with France than the United States. Always in his bowler hat, he was a witty presence, along with his good friend Constant Detré, at Le Dôme Café, Jockey-Club de Paris, and the other haunts of the area's bohemian society. Pascin visited Bulgaria in 1923 and 1924 and at an uncertain later date.

== Career ==
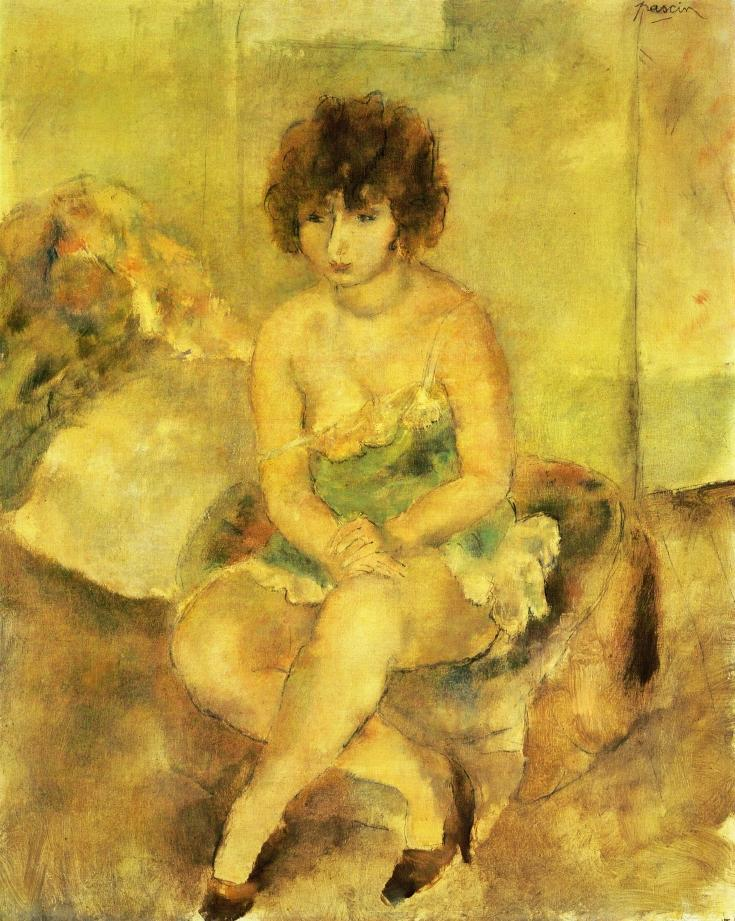
Portrait of Lucy Krohg, c. 1925, oil and pencil on canvas

Like Henri de Toulouse-Lautrec, Pascin drew upon his surroundings and his friends, both male and female, as subjects. During the 1920s, Pascin mostly painted fragile petites filles, prostitutes waiting for clients, or models waiting for the sitting to end. His fleetingly rendered paintings sold readily, but the money he made was quickly spent. Famous as the host of numerous large parties in his flat, whenever he was invited elsewhere for dinner, he arrived with as many bottles of wine as he could carry. He frequently led a large group of friends on summer picnics beside the river Marne, where their excursions lasted all afternoon.

According to his biographer, Georges Charensol:

Scarcely had he chosen his table at the Dôme or the Sélect than he would be surrounded by five or six friends; at nine o'clock, when we got up to dinner, we would be 20 in all, and later in the evening, when we decided to go up to Montmartre to Charlotte Gardelle's or the Princess Marfa's—where Pascin loved to take the place of the drummer in the jazz band—he had to provide for 10 taxis.

Among Pascin's circle of Parisian friends was Ernest Hemingway, whose memoir A Moveable Feast includes a chapter titled "With Pascin At the Dôme", which recounts a night in 1923 when he met Pascin and two of his young models for drinks at the café. The closing of the chapter was especially poignant, where Hemingway writes:

...He looked more like a Broadway character of the Nineties than the lovely painter that he was, and afterwards, when he had hanged himself, I liked to remember him as he was that night at the Dome. They say the seeds of what we will do are in all of us, but it always seemed to me that in those who make jokes in life the seeds are covered with better soil and with a higher grade of manure.

Pascin's fellow artist friends and contemporaries included: Chaim Soutine, Isaac Frenkel Frenel, Michel Kikoine and other Jewish artists of the School Of Paris.

== Style ==
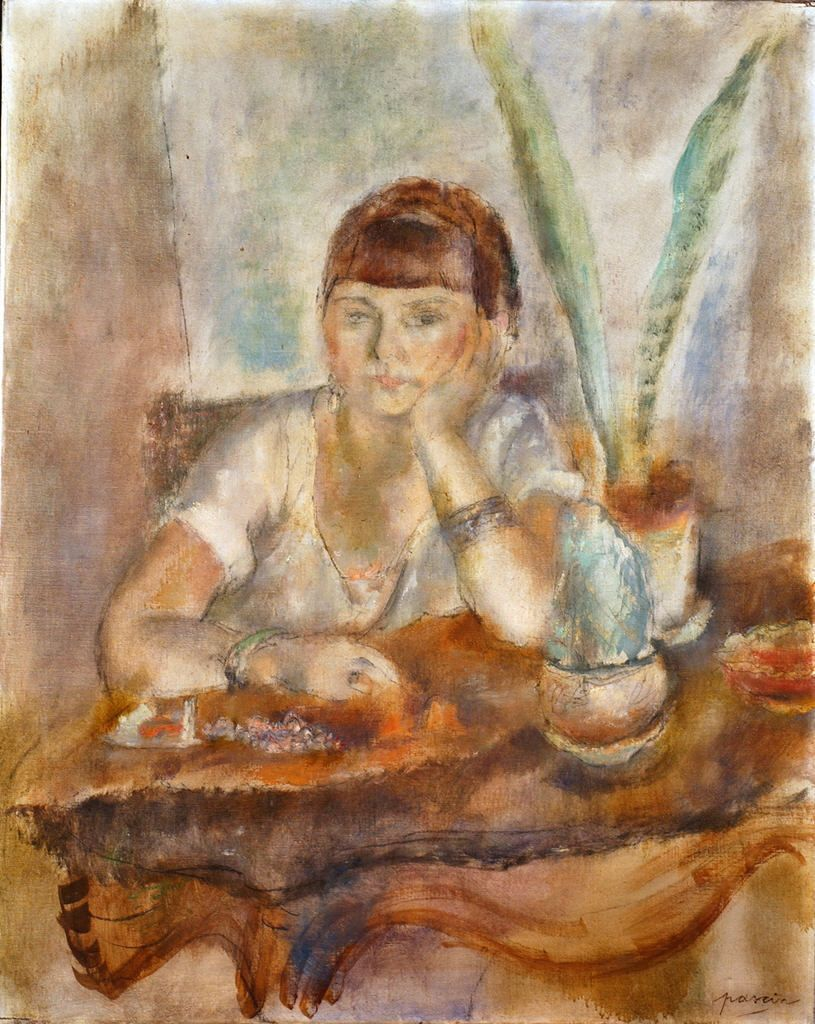
Portrait of Mimi Laurent, c. 1927–28, oil on canvas, Hirshhorn Museum and Sculpture Garden, Washington, DC.

His experience as a satirical draftsman and his knowledge of German expressionism are evident in his early works, where some portraits evoke Otto Dix or Grosz with a less incisive and less cruel touch. He quickly evolved towards pastel-like, almost unreal colors that he skillfully harmonized with the theme of the female body, the center of his production. Among the painters of the School of Paris, Pascin, his art noted itself with the imposition of expressive truth and melancholic gentleness. He painted with indulgence the underworld "of the girls," using a pearly touch, light with iridescent colors, in shades of gray, pink, ocher, and violet-blue. The languid bodies with softened forms exuded a heavy scent of eroticism. These women, captured in their intimacy, are, in fact, the mirror of Pascin's existential malaise. His vibrant graphic style, with lines that only vaguely outline the contours of the body, allowed him to depict his models bathed in a light that reflects more a state of mind than the reality of a body. In this regard, he can be seen as an unsparing continuator of the 18th-century masters and their taste for freedom and libertinage.

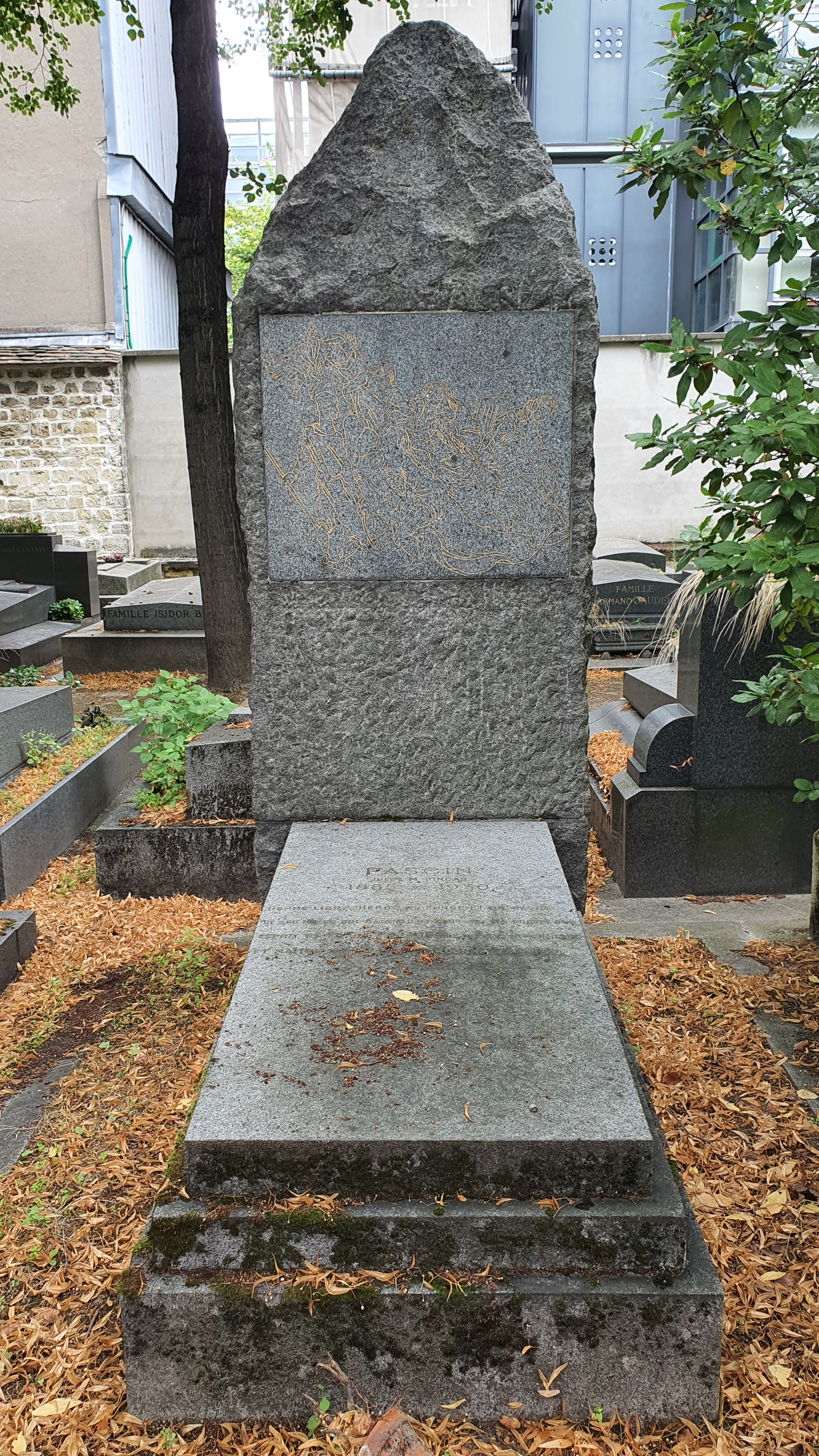
Pascin's grave in Montparnasse Cemetery, Paris

== Death ==
Pascin struggled with depression and alcoholism. "[D]riven to the wall by his own legend", according to art critic Gaston Diehl, he died by suicide at the age of 45 on the eve of a prestigious solo show. He slit his wrists and hanged himself in his studio in Montmartre. He left a message written in blood on the wall to his mistress Lucy Krohg. In his last will and testament, Pascin split his estate equally between his wife, Hermine David, and Lucy Krohg.

On the day of Pascin's funeral, June 7, 1930, thousands of acquaintances from the artistic community, and dozens of waiters and bartenders from the restaurants and saloons Pascin had frequented, all dressed in black, walked behind his coffin for three miles, from his studio at 36 boulevard de Clichy to the Cimetière de Saint-Ouen. A year later, Pascin's family had his remains re-interred at the more prestigious cimetière du Montparnasse.

== Honours ==
Pascin Point in Antarctica is named after Jules Pascin.

In 2023, the former synagogue in Pascin's birthplace was reopened as the Jules Pascin Cultural Centre.

== See also ==
- Marc Chagall
- Amadeo Modigliani
