= Thorleif Schjelderup =

Norwegian ski jumper

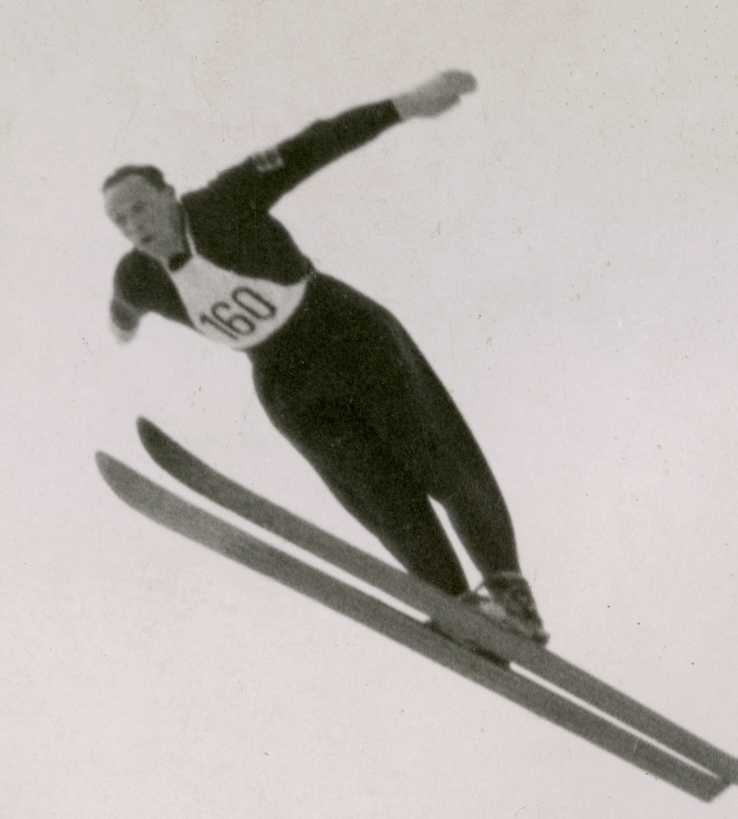

Personal information
- Nationality: Norwegian
- Born: 20 January 1920 Oslo, Norway
- Died: 28 May 2006 (aged 86) Oslo, Norway
- Occupations: Author, skier
- Spouses: Sossen Krohg; Anne Brown

Sport
- Sport: Ski jumping
Medal record
Representing Norway
Olympic Games
Bronze medal – third place	1948 St. Moritz	Individual large hill
World Championships
Bronze medal – third place	1948 St. Moritz	Individual large hill

Thorleif Schjelderup (20 January 1920 – 28 May 2006) was a Norwegian ski jumper, author and environmentalist.

He was born to Ferdinand Schjelderup and Marie Leigh Vogt. His father was a Supreme Court judge, a mountaineering pioneer, and a leader of the Norwegian resistance movement during World War II. His son grew up in Oslo, where he took up ski jumping. He placed fourth at the Holmenkollen ski festival in 1940 and second in 1946 and 1948. In 1948 he also won bronze medals at the national championships and Winter Olympics and graduated in law from the Oslo University. On 15 March 1950 he became the first Norwegian athlete to break the 100 m barrier when he jumped over 106 m in Planica, Yugoslavia. He retired in 1953 to become a ski jumping coach with Italian (1953–56) and Norwegian national teams (1956–1962).

Besides ski jumping Schjelderup was known as an author, photographer and environmentalist who traveled around the country to promote outdoor activities. He published 10 books, mostly about ski jumping and nature, including the first Norwegian textbook on environmentalism for the elementary school in 1973.

Schjelderup was married to the Norwegian actress and playwright Sossen Krohg from 1942 to 1947. In 1948 he met the African-American singer Anne Brown. She moved with him to Oslo where the couple eventually married. After their separation in 1969 he lived with the musical actress and singer Ranveig Eckhoff until 1985, and for several years they stayed in Stockholm.
