= Sossen Krohg =

Norwegian playwright and actress (1923–2016)

- Born: Sossen Anker Olsen; 18 December 1923; Kristiania (now Oslo), Norway
- Died: 12 February 2016 (aged 92)
- Occupations: Playwright, actress
- Spouses: Thorleif Schjelderup (m. 1943; div. 1947) Guy Krohg (m. 1949; died 2002)

Sossen Krohg (born Sossen Anker Olsen; 18 December 1923 – 12 February 2016) was a Norwegian playwright and stage and film actress.

== Personal life ==
She was born in Kristiania (now Oslo), Norway. She was the daughter of newspaper editor Kristoffer Anker Olsen and Ingeborg Cappelen Hille Finne. She was married to ski jumper Thorleif Schjelderup (1920–2006) from 1943 to 1947 and to painter Guy Krohg (1917–2002) from 1949.

== Career ==
Sossen Krohg graduated from the Det Norske Teatret school of theater in 1946 and made her stage debut in the play Kranes konditori which was based on the novel from 1945 by Norwegian author Cora Sandel (1880–1974). She was appointed at Det Norske Teatret from 1948 to 1952, and at Folketeatret from 1952 to 1960. She made her film debut in Døden er et kjærtegn from 1949 directed by Edith Carlmar (1911–2003).

Sossen Krohg lived and worked in Paris for several periods of his life, introducing in the 1960s. She established the stage Scene 7 as artistical director at Club 7 in Oslo in 1966 and run a small avant-garde theater until the club closed in the spring of 1985.

She wrote several plays for children, which were staged at Scene 7. She also published the memoir book Hekletøy med store hull (Oslo; Gyldendal, 1986). From 1998 onward she played the character "Astrid Anker-Hansen" in the television soap opera Hotel Cæsar.
