= Guy Krohg =

Norwegian painter, illustrator and scenographer

Guy Vidil Krohg
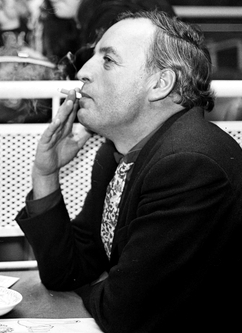
- Born: 27 July 1917
- Died: 19 October 2002 (aged 85)
- Spouses: Lilian Smith (m. 1940) Sossen Krohg (m. 1949)
- Parents: Per Krohg (father); Cécile Marie Vidil (mother)
- Relatives: Christian Krohg (grandfather); Oda Krohg (grandmother); Bokken Lasson (great-aunt); Per Lasson (great-uncle)

Guy Vidil Krohg (27 July 1917 – 19 October 2002) was a Norwegian painter, illustrator and scenographer.

== Biography ==
He was born on 27 July 1917, in Kristiania, the son of French model Cécile Marie Vidil (also known as Lucy Krohg), and Norwegian painter Per Krohg. He was the paternal grandson of Christian Krohg and Oda Krohg.

He was married to Lilian Smith from 1940, and to actress Sossen Krohg from 1949. He is represented at the National Gallery with Vintersol from 1954 and other works. He worked for a number of theatres, including Oslo Nye Teater, Studioteatret, Det Norske Teatret and Nationaltheatret. In 1995 he published a biography of his father.
