= Hermine David =

French painter (1886–1970)

Hermine Lionette Cartan David
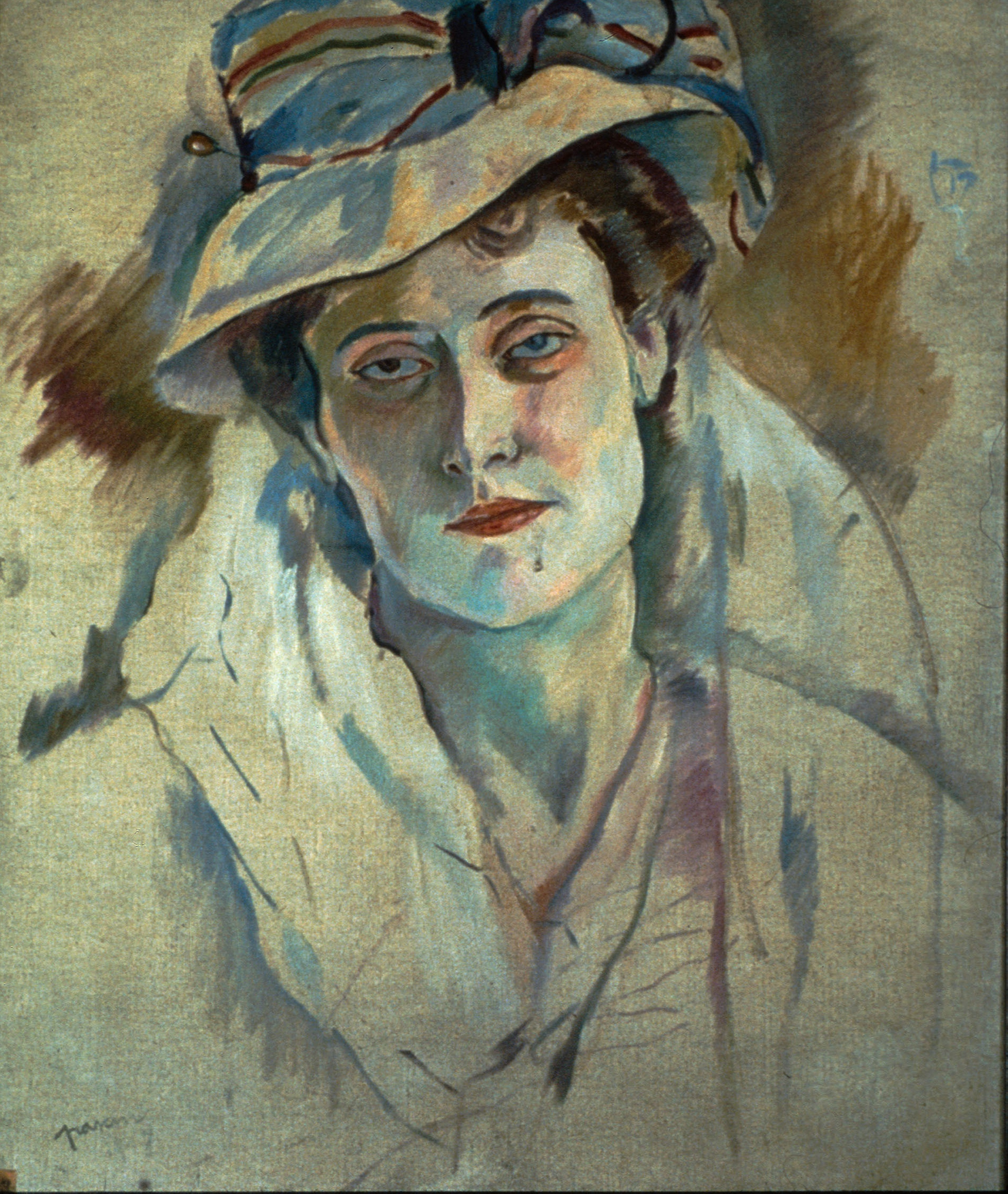
- Portrait of Hermine David by Jules Pascin
- Born: 19 April 1886; Paris, France
- Died: 1 December 1970 (aged 84); Bry-sur-Marne, France
- Known for: Painting
- Spouse: Jules Pascin (m. 1917–1920)
- Awards: Legion of Honor award (1932)

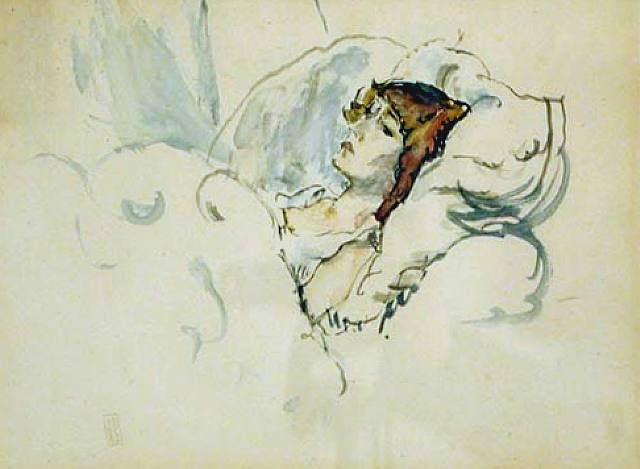
Jules Pascin, Hermine in bed

Hermine Lionette Cartan David (19 April 1886 – 1 December 1970) was a French painter.

== Early life and education ==
Hermine David was born in Paris in 1886. She was born out of wedlock; her mother insisted that her biological father was a Habsburg archduke.

== Career ==
She became one of the École de Paris artists, a group of mostly non-French artists, émigrés particularly from eastern Europe who were working in Paris before World War I. Jules Pascin was another member of that artistic group, whom she met in 1907. By that time, she was already well-established as a successful young painter, miniaturist and printmaker. She followed Pascin to the United States in 1915, where they were married on 25 September 1918. They stayed a total of five years, past the end of World War I. David exhibited in New York City during her residence there.

In 1920, after they returned to France, she exhibited in London and in several solo shows at prominent Paris galleries.

While her finest work dates to the 1920s and '30s, including the book illustrations for which she developed a passion in the '20s, she was active into the 1960s. She won a watercolor prize at the Biennale de Deauville in 1965. Her work was also part of the painting event in the art competition at the 1932 Summer Olympics.

She outlived her husband by forty years after he committed suicide in 1930. She died in 1970 in Bry-sur-Marne.

Her work is included in the collection of the Musée national des beaux-arts du Québec.
