= Per Krohg =

Norwegian visual artist (1889–1965)

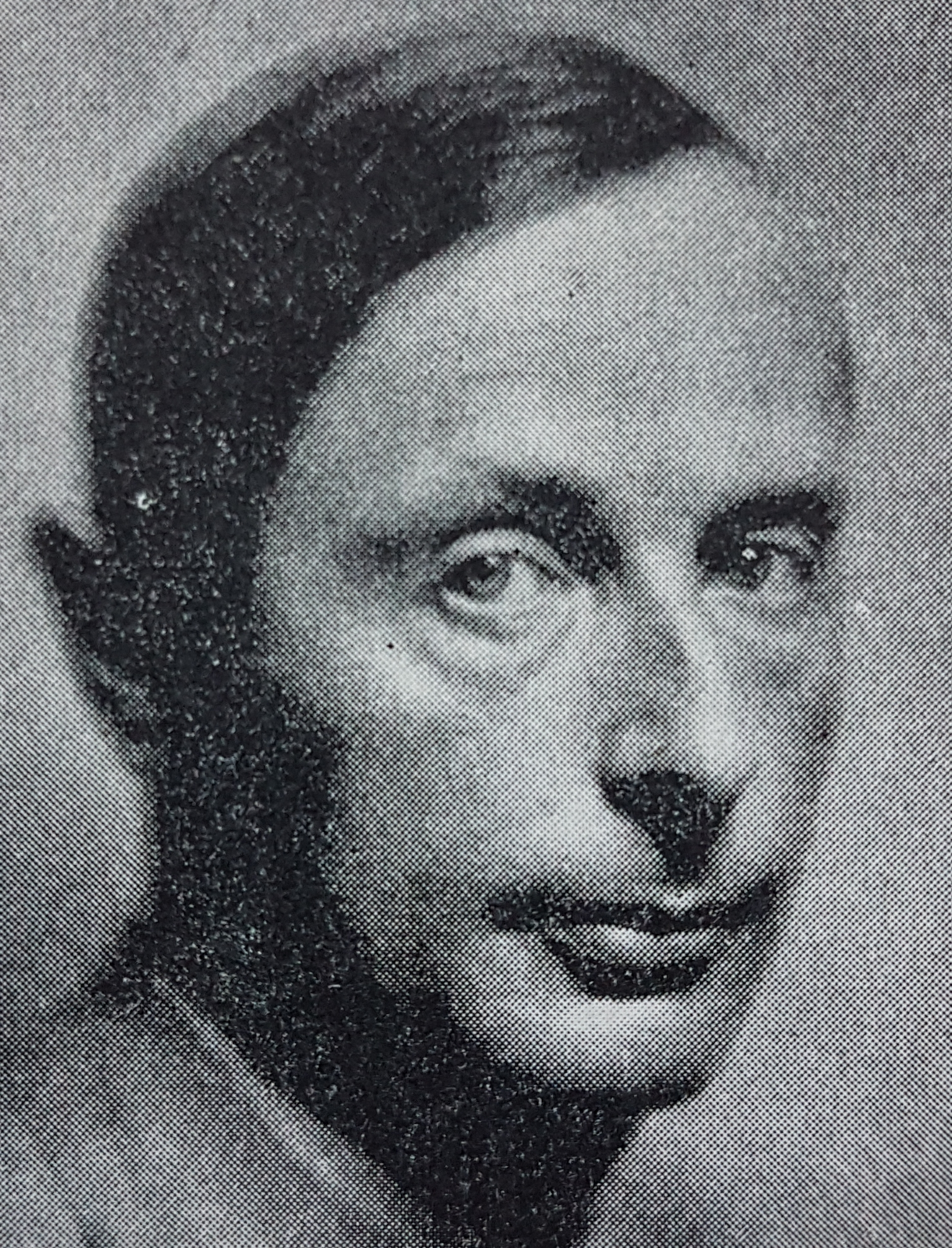
- Born: Per Lasson Krohg; 18 June 1889; Åsgårdstrand, Norway
- Died: 3 March 1965 (aged 75)
- Spouse(s): Cécile Marie Vidil (m. 1915; div. 1934) Ragnhild Helene Andersen (m. 1934)
- Children: Guy Krohg
- Parents: Christian Krohg (father); Oda Krohg (mother)

Per Lasson Krohg (18 June 1889 – 3 March 1965) was a Norwegian visual artist and teacher. He is best known for the mural he created for the United Nations Security Council Chamber, located in the United Nations headquarters in New York City.

== Biography ==
Per Krohg was born in Åsgårdstrand, Norway, the son of painters Christian Krohg and Oda Krohg. The family lived in Paris, where Per Krohg grew up. He showed early artistic talent, and studied first with his father (from 1903 to 1907), then with Henri Matisse at Académie Matisse (from 1909 to 1910). His first employment was as a newspaper illustrator and tango teacher. While in Paris, he was also the instructor of future architect Maja Melandsø.

Krohg's work as an artist covered a wide field, from drawing on paper, illustrations, and posters to set design, sculpture, and monumental paintings. After returning to Norway in 1930 he taught at the National College of Art and Design in Oslo.

During World War II, he was a forced labourer at Veidal Prison Camp. In 1946 he was appointed professor at the National Art Academy, and served as its director from 1955 to 1958. Among others, his students included Frithjof Tidemand-Johannessen and Tulla Blomberg Ranslet.

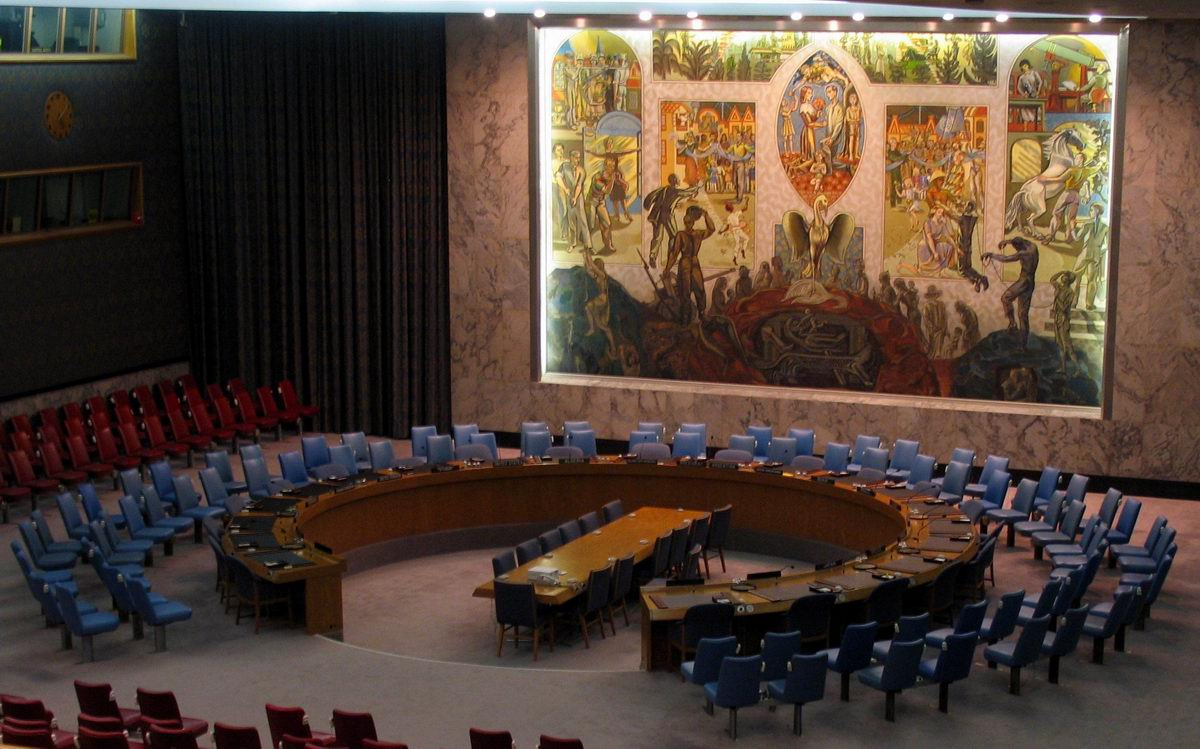
Mural at the United Nations Security Council Chamber in New York City

Krohg created the murals for the United Nations Security Council Chamber, located in the United Nations building in New York City. He adorned many other public buildings with large frescoes, including Oslo City Hall, the Physics and Chemistry Buildings at the University of Oslo and the National Library, Oslo. He is represented with six works in the collection of the National Gallery of Denmark.

In 1950 he received the King's Medal of Merit in gold, and 1955 he was appointed Commander of the Order of St. Olav. From 1936 he was a member of the Swedish Royal Academy of Fine Arts in Stockholm and in 1948 he was awarded the Swedish Prince Eugen Medal.

== Personal life ==
He was married twice. In 1915 he married artist Cécile Marie ("Lucy") Vidil (1891–1977). Their marriage was dissolved in 1934. He was the father of Norwegian artist Guy Krohg (1917–2002), from his first marriage.

His second marriage was in 1934, to Ragnhild Helene Andersen (1908–1972).

== Other sources ==
- Nergaard, Trygve Bilder av Per Krohg (Aschehoug. 2000) ISBN 82-03-22447-4
- Hölaas, O. Per Krohg. A retrospective loan exhibition of oil paintings (New York: Galerie St. Etienne, 1954)
- Langaard, Johan Per Krohg (Glendendal Norsk Forlat. 1931)
