= Trois Mélodies =

Trois Mélodies (French for 'Three Melodies') may refer to:

- Trois Mélodies (Satie)
- Trois Mélodies, Op. 7 (Fauré)
