= Trois Petites Pièces montées =

1920 suite by Erik Satie

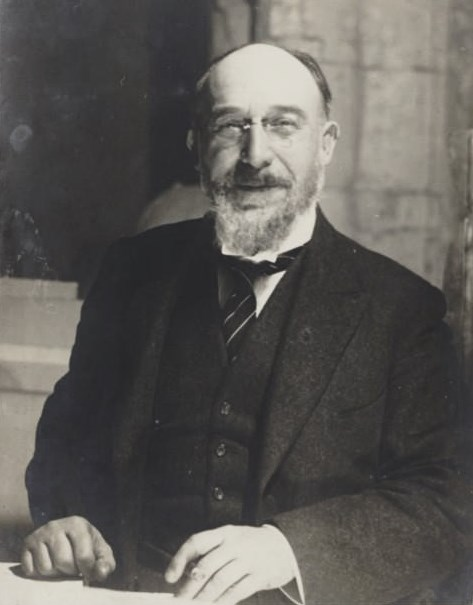
Erik Satie

The Trois Petites Pièces montées (Three Little Stuffed Pieces) is a suite for small orchestra by Erik Satie, inspired by themes from the novel series Gargantua and Pantagruel by François Rabelais. It was premiered at the Comédie des Champs-Élysées in Paris on February 21, 1920, conducted by Vladimir Golschmann. Satie later arranged it for piano four hands and today it is more frequently heard in this version. A typical performance lasts about five minutes.

== Background ==
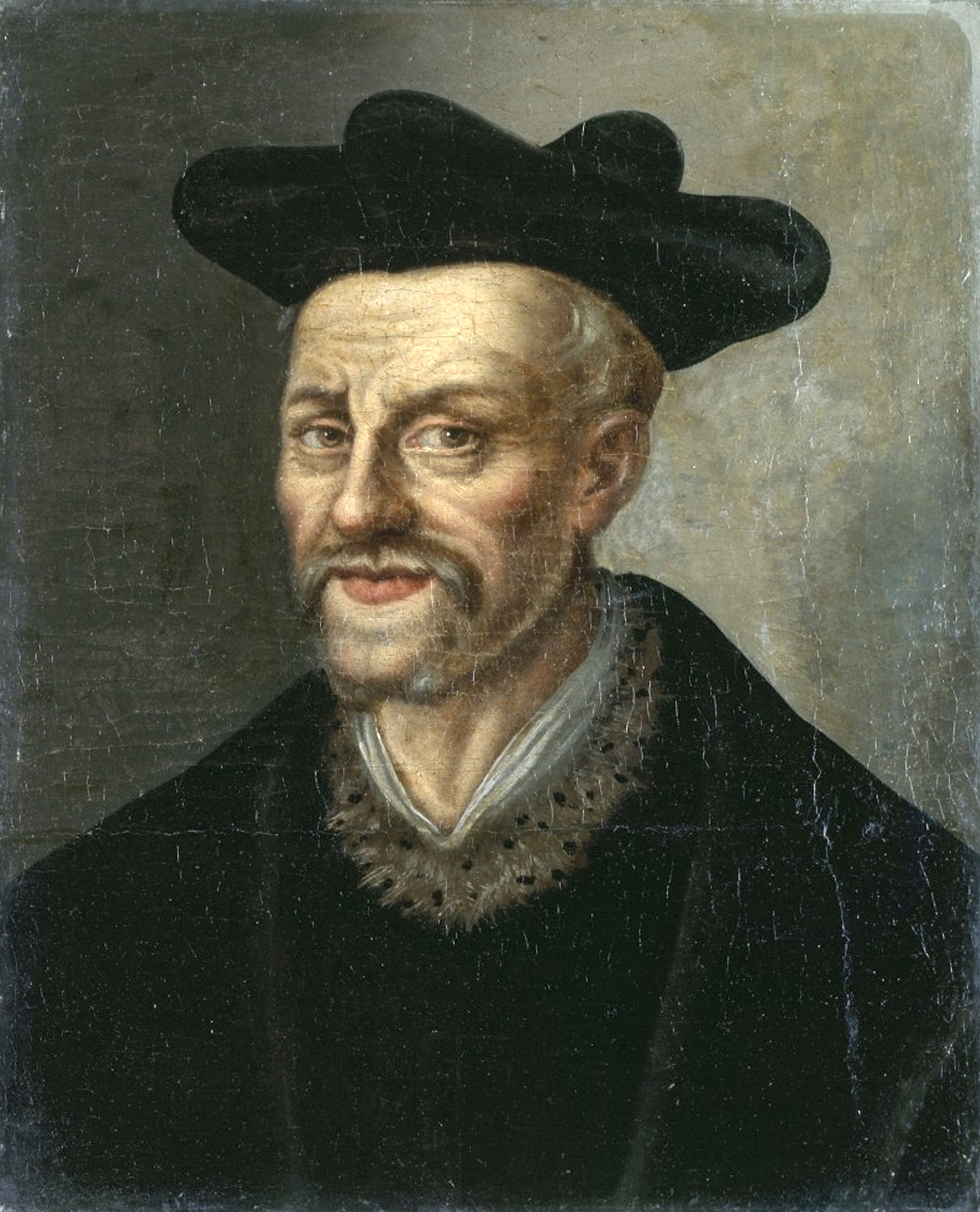
François Rabelais (1494–1553)

Satie was well-read in humorous and imaginative literature, and the figure of Rabelais loomed large in his bohemian youth. The 16th-century French satirist was an idol of the early Montmartre cabaret scene. At the Chat Noir, where Satie played piano in the late 1880s, a drinking cup allegedly belonging to the author was on reverent display. Recalling those days in a 1922 essay, Satie went so far as to claim that one of his great-uncles used to "bend the elbow" with Rabelais at the legendary Pomme de Pin tavern in Paris. Apart from a song about the Mad Hatter, Le Chapelier from his cycle Trois Mélodies (1916), the only comic literary characters Satie evoked in his music were the endlessly hungry and boozing giants Gargantua and his son Pantagruel.

Food and eating were frequent themes of Satie's own extramusical humor. His poverty made him all too familiar with hunger at times, leading to his wry observation, "It's odd. You'll find someone in every bar willing to buy you a drink. No one ever dreams of presenting you with a sandwich." In a letter to his brother Conrad, Satie jokingly claimed his appetite was gargantuan on those occasions when he was able to eat to his heart's content: he could devour a 30-egg omelette or 150 oysters in one sitting. His affinity for the bawdy, food-obsessed Rabelais is made clear in the Trois Petites Pièces montées.

== Composition history ==
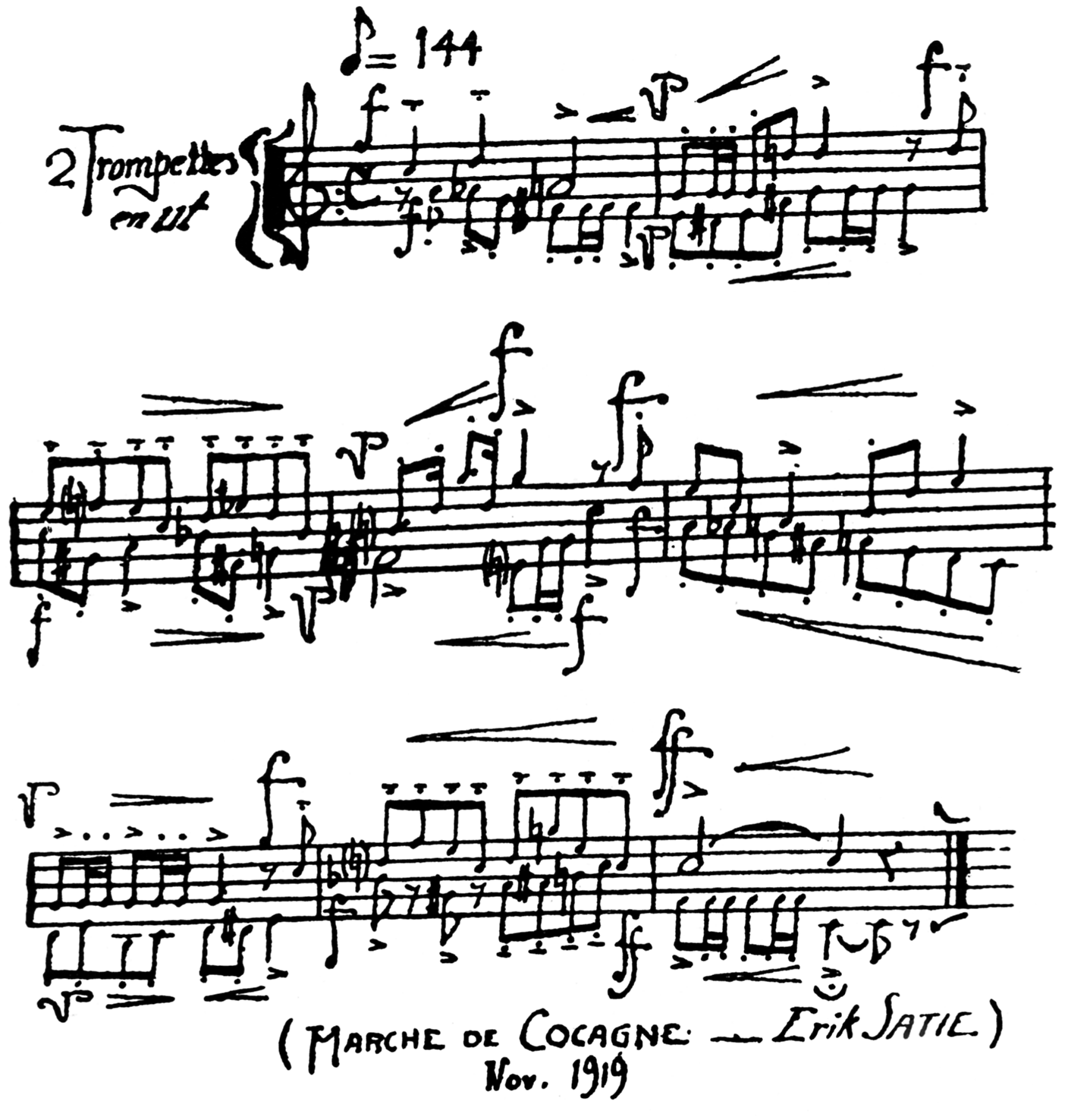
Autograph manuscript of Satie's Marche de Cocagne

In November 1919, the young cookery historian Bertrand Guégan asked Satie to set a poem to music for his Almanach de Cocagne (Cockaigne Almanac), an annual publication "dedicated to true gourmets and serious drinkers." Satie claimed the deadline was too short for him to do the job properly and instead submitted a brief fanfare-like march for 2 trumpets, giving it the title Marche de Cocagne. As musical fanfares had been used to announce the courses of luxurious French banquets since the Middle Ages, his offering was in keeping with the gastronomic and historical themes of Guégan's journal. It would appear as the frontispiece of the Almanach, with a woodcut illustration by Raoul Dufy, in 1920. This was the nucleus of the Trois petites pièces montées.

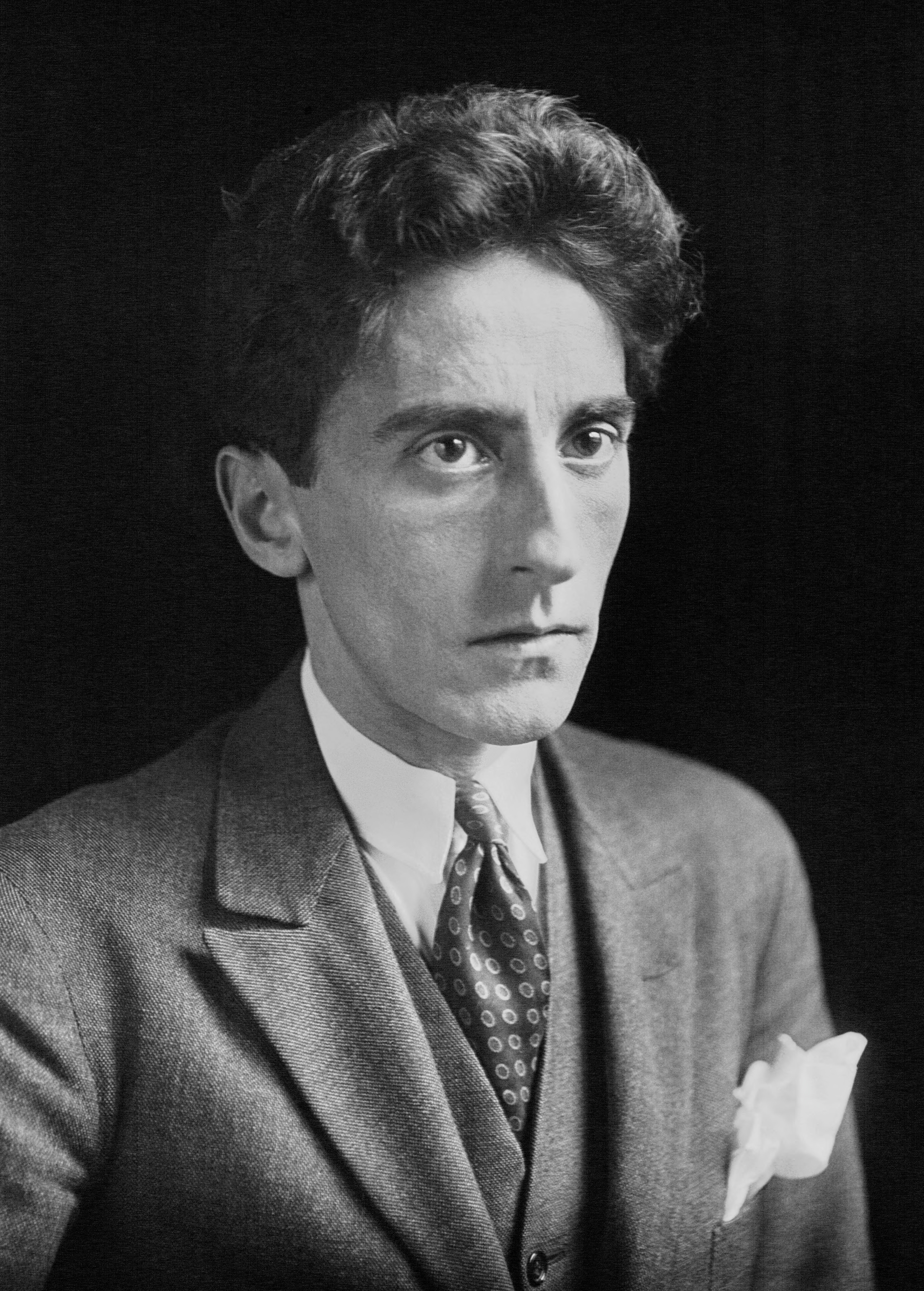
Jean Cocteau

Jean Cocteau, who at that time was presenting himself as a propagandist for the esprit nouveau of postwar French music, then invited Satie to participate in a theatrical event he was organizing for the end of the Paris winter season. Enthralled with Darius Milhaud's new score for Le bœuf sur le toit, he had persuaded the wealthy French nobleman Count Étienne de Beaumont to book the Comédie stage of the Théâtre des Champs-Élysées for a week of performances, and now he needed to fill out the rest of the program. His original plan was to include Satie's yet unperformed Cinq Grimaces pour Le Songe d'une nuit d'été, composed in 1915 for Cocteau's unrealized Cirque Medrano production of A Midsummer Night's Dream. Satie wrote to Milhaud with a different idea:

"My Dear Friend - I am so sorry: the Grimaces are written for too large an orchestra. If you like, I could write Trois petites Marches - including the Marche de Cocagne - for small orchestra, with a duration of 10 minutes..."

This proposal was accepted and Satie began composition in December 1919. How the "Three Little Marches" evolved into a Rabelais-themed suite with an overtly satirical finale is a mystery, as Satie was secretive about what motivated him to compose. His intentions may have been the subject of a note he sent Milhaud on January 10, 1920, while the work was still in progress: "Come tomorrow, and...'Don't give anything away.' Not a word to ANYBODY, above all: 'Don't give anything away.' SERIOUS." In his book "Satie the Bohemian" (1999), Steven Moore Whiting detailed Satie's uneasy relations with Cocteau and suspected that the concluding Coin de Polka, with its suggestions of Rabelaisian obscenity and "heavy-handed" music hall-style humor, was "a caricature of Cocteau's whole enterprise." The short score for the pièces montées was completed on January 3, 1920 and the orchestration by January 24, when Satie informed Milhaud, "I have finished - Happy am I."

== Music and literary themes ==
The common English translation of Satie's collective title, Three Little Stuffed Pieces, loses much of the punning of the original French. A pièce montée is an edible patisserie sculpture made from sugar and other confections, and serves as a centerpiece at a formal banquet; "pièce" can also refer to a short musical composition, and the verb monter variously means "mount", "climb", "to stuff", or "go uphill".

The pieces differ in style and tone and no attempt is made to link them musically, although the bassoon plays a prominent role in Nos. 1 and 3. Yet there is a sense of "mounting" excitement as the music progresses from the gentle Rêverie and the more extrovert Marche to the raucous Coin de Polka. The titles of the outer pieces are chapter headings from Gargantua and Pantagruel, which serve as subtexts for those familiar with Rabelais; the music itself does not follow a literal program.

1. De l'enfance de Pantagruel (The Infancy of Pantagruel) – Rêverie
2. Marche de Cocagne (Cockaigne March) – Démarche
3. Jeux de Gargantua (Gargantua's Games) – Coin de Polka

Satie scored the suite for a standard music hall ensemble of 25 players (excluding the tuba): 1 flute, 1 oboe, 1 clarinet, 1 bassoon, 1 horn in F, 2 trumpets in C, 1 trombone, snare drum, cymbals, bass drum, and strings (1st & 2nd violins, violas, cellos, and double basses). It is dedicated to Madame Julien Henriquet.

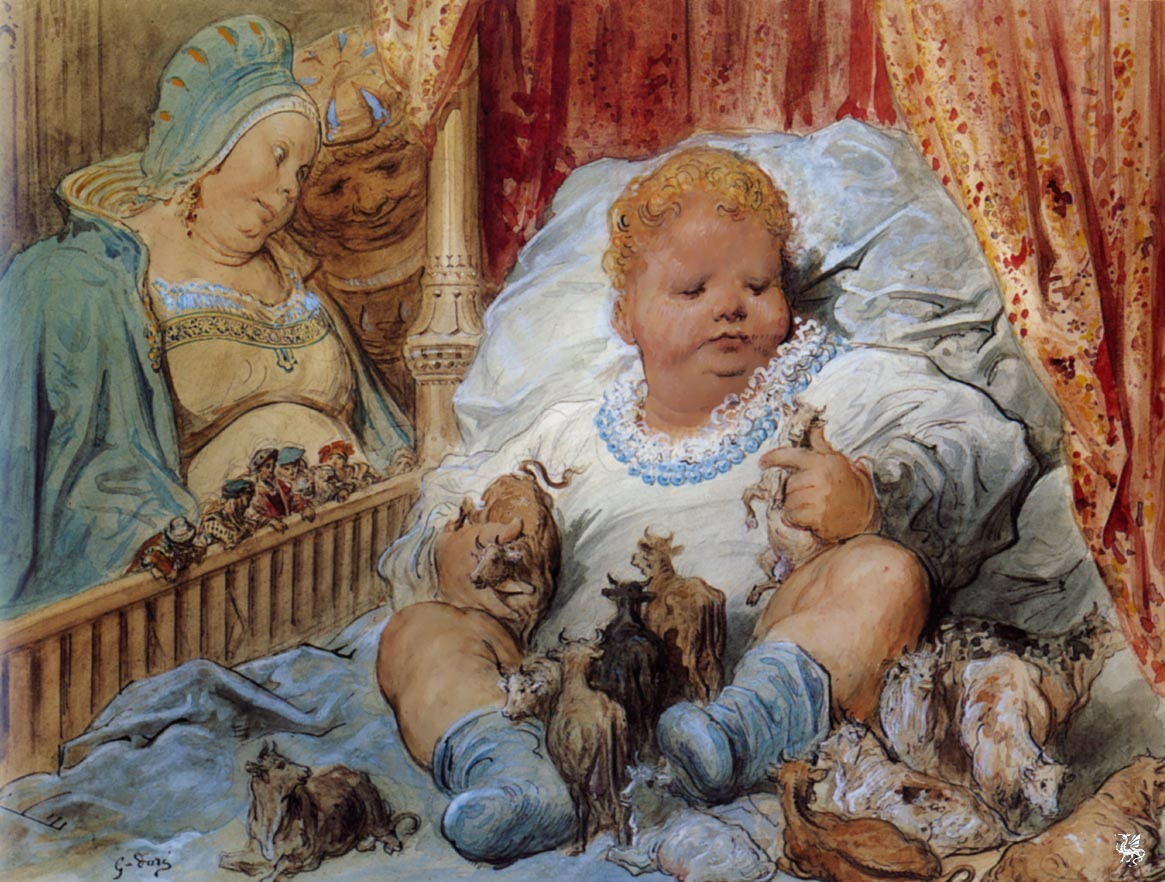
Gustave Doré, The Infancy of Pantagruel (1873)

=== I. De l'enfance de Pantagruel ===
In Book 2, Chapter 4 of Gargantua and Pantagruel, Rabelais describes how the enormous baby Pantagruel drank the milk of 4600 cows straight from the source at each feeding, and was chained to his cradle to keep him from shoving the animals into his mouth. Despite the restraints he figures out how to walk and follows his nose into the royal banquet hall, carrying the cradle on his back "like a tortoise climbing up a wall". Gargantua frees him and rules that Pantagruel is now big enough to dine with the grown-ups.

The designation Rêverie notwithstanding, Satie's music is quietly lyrical rather than dreamlike. It has a detached quality not far removed from his previous compositions, the piano Nocturnes (1919), a series he curtailed to write this suite. Satie imbues it with a certain ponderousness by giving the main theme of the A section to the bassoon over an undulating string ostinato, and by what pianist Olof Höjer described as "a heavy-footed, bloated quality in its movement pattern." In the recapitulation the bassoon theme is extended through repetition and a cadential phrase.

=== II. Marche de Cocagne ===
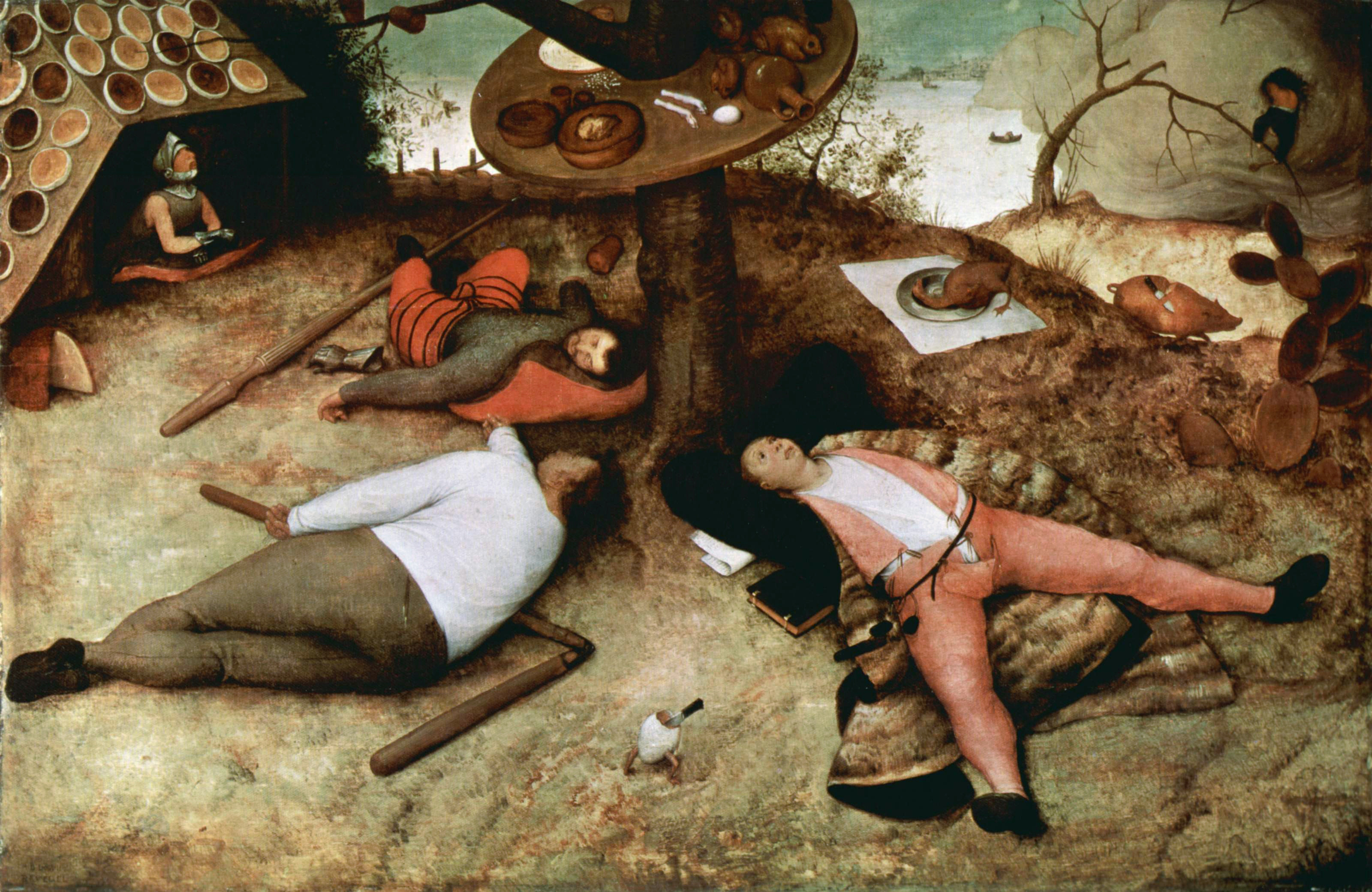
Pieter Bruegel the Elder, The Land of Cockaigne (1567)

Cockaigne was a mythical land of plenty in Medieval and Renaissance literature, where the skies rained custard, rivers of wine flowed beneath mountains of butter and cheese, and laziness was rewarded. Rabelais does not mention Cockaigne directly but satirizes the premise at various points of Gargantua and Pantagruel, notably in Book IV, in which Pantagruel visits an island whose inhabitants (called "gastrolators") worship the belly as their only god. The myth later became a metaphor for gluttony and excess. In Satie's time "Cockaigne" was a jocular nickname for Paris as well as London.

The Marche de Cocagne is an exercise in Neoclassical music. The opening reproduces the original 8-bar trumpet duet, while the central section is a stately little processional led by the strings très chanté ("very song-like"). An imposing slow roll on the bass drum suggests the arrival of something big, which turns out to be a triumphant restatement of the trumpet theme by most of the ensemble (except for the horn and percussion).

=== III. Jeux de Gargantua ===
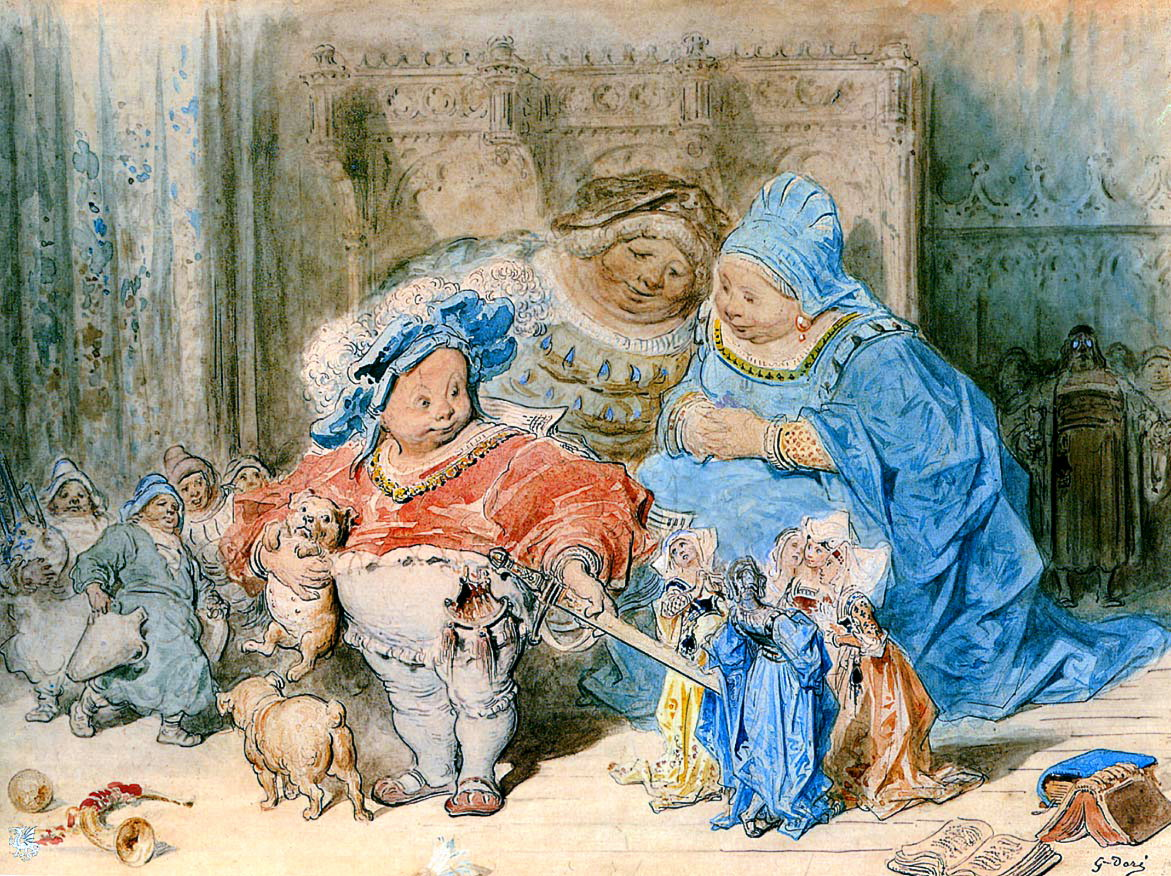
Doré's depiction of the young Gargantua

After the relative earnestness of the preceding two movements, the humorist in Satie takes center stage in this "bit of a polka" bearing the title of Book 1, Chapter 22 of Gargantua. Most of that chapter is devoted to a long list of games young Gargantua enjoyed after meals, among them such amusements as "Plunder", "Torture", "Rape the Ox", "Shit in His Beard", and "Salvo of Farts."

A droll oom-pah-pah-like phrase introduces a farrago of musical clichés from the French fairground, cabaret and circus, in particular the exaggerated percussion effects (snare drum rolls, bass drum-cymbal crashes) that come in at seemingly arbitrary moments of the music. This is followed by an unaccompanied exchange between clarinet and bassoon, instructed to play niaisement ("stupidly") by the composer. The bassoon, initially content to mimic the clarinet's three-note mutterings, soon dominates the tête-à-tête. Both instruments are cut off by four flatulent-sounding blasts from the trombone (marked "blow without attack" in the score) and the full orchestra hastens the suite to a bombastic conclusion.

== Reception ==
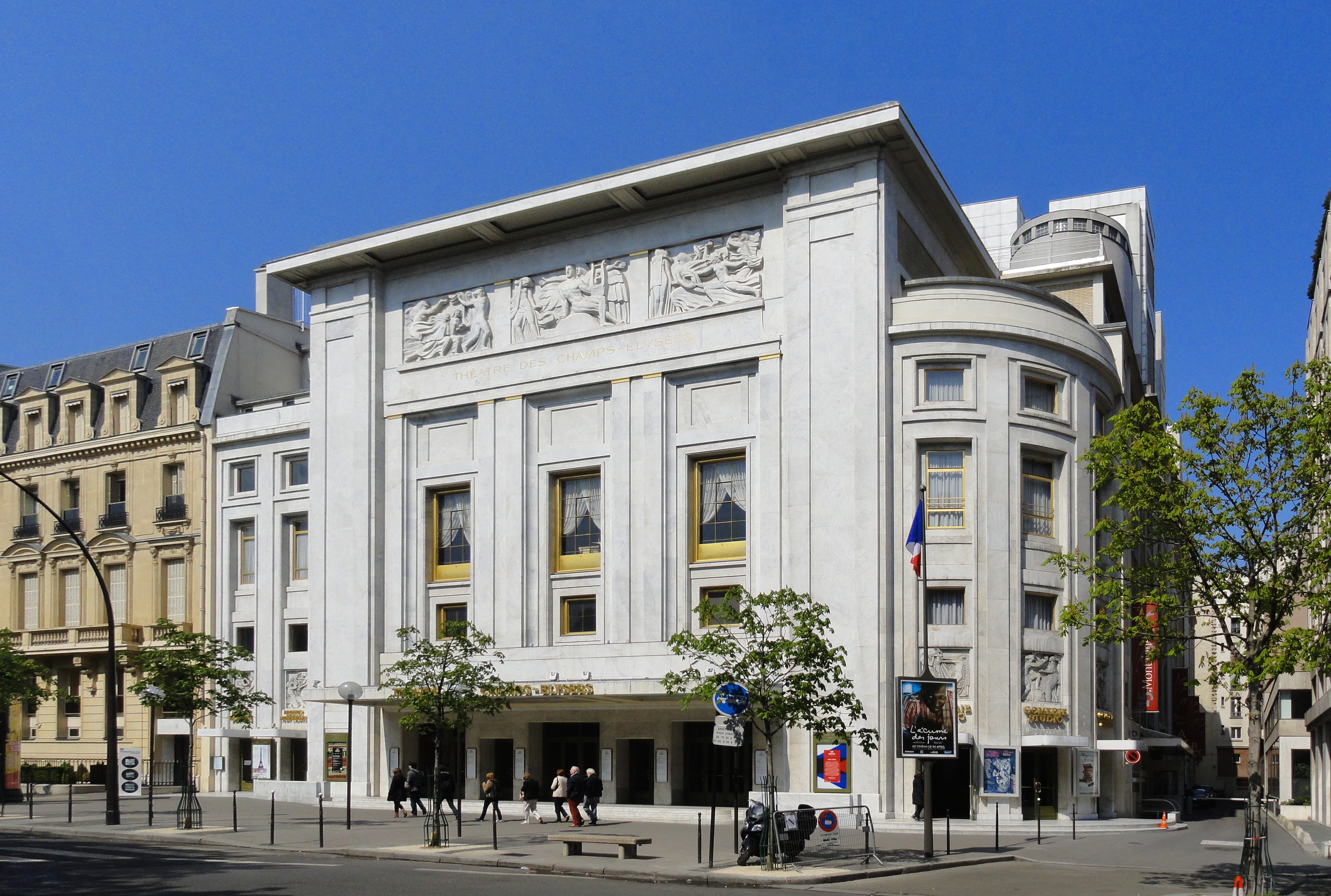
Théâtre des Champs-Élysées in Paris, site of the premiere of Trois Petites Pièces montées. The separate entrance to the Comédie theatre is at right

Cocteau's "Premiere Spectacle-Concert", as he called his musical event, opened before a select audience at the Comédie des Champs-Élysées on February 21, 1920. Its theme was the glorification of French popular culture, as represented by the newly baptized composers of Les Six and their "master" Erik Satie. The program consisted of an Overture and the song cycle Cocardes (to Cocteau texts) by Francis Poulenc; Adieu, New York!, a foxtrot by Georges Auric performed onstage by two acrobats; Satie's pièces montées; and Le Bœuf sur le toit. Although the fully staged "pantomime farce" Le Bœuf ultimately dominated the show, the audience responded so favorably to Satie's suite that conductor Golschmann encored it twice. A second performance was held as a benefit for disabled war veterans on February 23 and three more (including a matinee) took place on February 25 and 28, 1920.

Satie arranged the suite for piano 4-hands and made a separate arrangement of the first piece for solo piano under the title Rêverie de l'enfance de Pantagruel; both were published by Éditions de la Sirène in 1920. On December 19 of that year the composer and pianist André Salomon premiered the duet version during an all-Satie concert at the Galerie la Boétie in Paris. Éditions de la Sirène brought out the original orchestral score in 1921.

Notable performances of the Trois Petites Pièces montées during Satie's lifetime include conductor Gabriel Pierné's rendition with the Concerts Colonne on December 17, 1921, and Vladimir Golschmann's four presentations in concerts sponsored by the Ballets suédois (October 25 to 31, 1923). In June 1924, choreographer Leonide Massine assembled two of Satie's piano duets, Trois Morceaux en forme de poire (1903) and the keyboard reduction of the pièces montées, into the ballet Premier Amour for the Soirées de Paris stage company at the Théâtre de la Cigale. It was a solo number starring Lydia Lopokova as a girl who dreams she falls in love with a doll. Satie and Marcelle Meyer played the piano during its handful of performances. Since Satie's death the original version of the suite has been largely neglected, even by conductors (Maurice Abravanel, Michel Plasson) who committed much of his modest orchestral catalog to disc.

== Recordings ==
French conductor Pierre Chagnon and an unidentified ensemble recorded the Trois Petites Pièces montées for the Columbia label in 1928, one of the earliest recordings of Satie's orchestral music. Chagnon adopts brisk tempi throughout, presumably to accommodate the limits of a single 78 rpm side; the performance comes in at just under 4 minutes.

Commercial releases in the stereo and digital eras are represented by Anthony Bernard with the London Chamber Orchestra (RCA Victor, 1959), Manuel Rosenthal with the French National Radio and Television Orchestra (Everest, 1968), Friedrich Cerha and the Ensemble "Die Reihe" (Candide, 1970), Gennady Rozhdestvensky with the Chamber Ensemble of the Leningrad Philharmonic (Melodia, 1976, reissued by ABC Westminster Gold and Eurodisc), and Yutaka Sado and the Orchestre Lamoureux (Erato, 2001).

Piano 4 Hands: Aldo Ciccolini recorded it twice for EMI, overdubbing the second piano part himself in 1971 and paired with Gabriel Tacchino in 1988. Other recordings are by Wyneke Jordans and Leo van Doeselaar (Etcetera, 1983), Klára Körmendi and Gábor Eckhardt (Naxos, 1994), Olof Höjer and Max Lorstad (Swedish Society, 1996) Jean-Philippe Collard and Pascal Rogé (Decca, 2000), and Katia and Marielle Labèque (KML, 2009).
