= Quatre Petites Mélodies =

1920 song cycle by Erik Satie

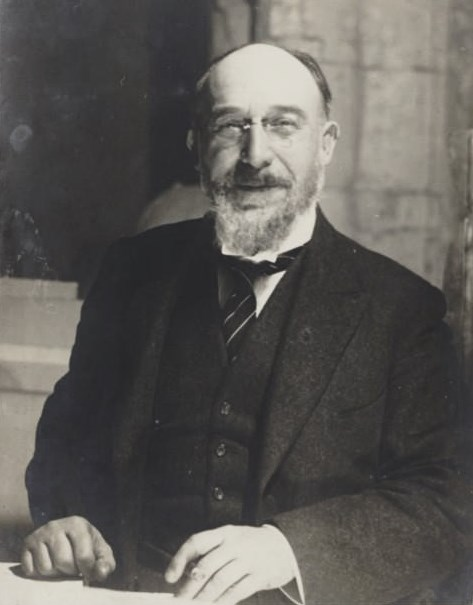
Erik Satie

The Quatre Petites Mélodies (Four Little Songs or Melodies) is a 1920 song cycle for voice and piano by French composer Erik Satie. It is most notable for its opening lament, Élégie, which Satie composed in memory of his friend Claude Debussy. A typical performance lasts under 4 minutes.

== Background ==
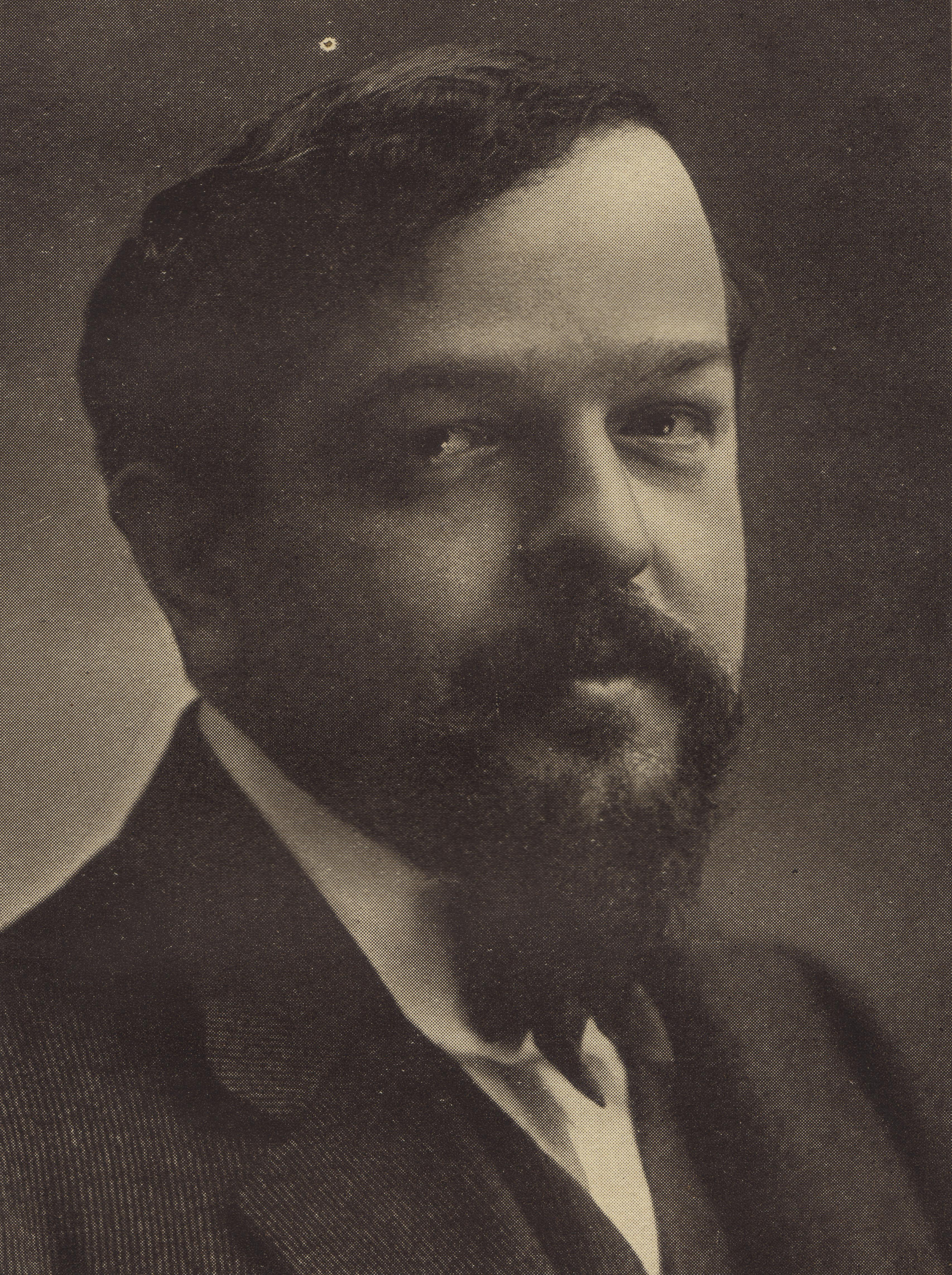
Claude Debussy

In the autumn of 1920, Henry Prunières, founder-editor of the monthly music journal La Revue musicale, announced he would publish a commemorative edition of his magazine to honor the legacy of Claude Debussy, who had died in 1918. It would include a memorial supplement, Le Tombeau de Claude Debussy, a collective musical tribute for which Prunières invited Europe's leading composers to contribute. Ten musicians responded with either newly-written pieces or excerpts from their current works in progress: Paul Dukas, Albert Roussel, Gian Francesco Malipiero, Eugene Goossens, Béla Bartók, Florent Schmitt, Igor Stravinsky, Maurice Ravel, Manuel de Falla, and Erik Satie.

For Satie this was an opportunity to address an unhealed wound. Debussy was probably the closest friend he ever had. He once wrote, "From the moment I saw [Debussy] for the first time, I was drawn to him and wanted to live constantly at his side". But both were difficult men and their relations grew strained in the 1910s, as Satie emerged from decades of obscurity as a composer while the world-famous Debussy was tormented by a long battle with cancer. After Debussy bitterly teased Satie during rehearsals of the latter's breakthrough ballet Parade in March 1917, Satie ended their friendship once and for all. When Debussy died the following year, Satie did not attend his funeral. But the loss had a profound impact on him. Years later he would jot down in one of his private notebooks, "When all is said and done, the good Debussy was more than all the others put together".

Satie completed his musical eulogy to Debussy, an Élégie for voice and piano, on September 27, 1920, dedicating it "In memory of an admiring and tender friendship of thirty years". It was first published as part of the Le Tombeau de Claude Debussy supplement in the December 1920 issue of La Revue musicale, with a frontispiece created by Raoul Dufy. Prunières said in his introduction, "This international tribute to the memory of Debussy will be a real 'monument' like those that Renaissance poets raised to the artists they had loved".

In the meantime, Satie decided to use the Élégie as the cornerstone of a full-fledged cycle of mélodies (French art songs). He composed three additional songs between October and December 1920 to comprise the Quatre Petites Mélodies.

== Songs ==
The definitive version of the Quatre Petites Mélodies is set to verses by four French authors spanning two centuries.

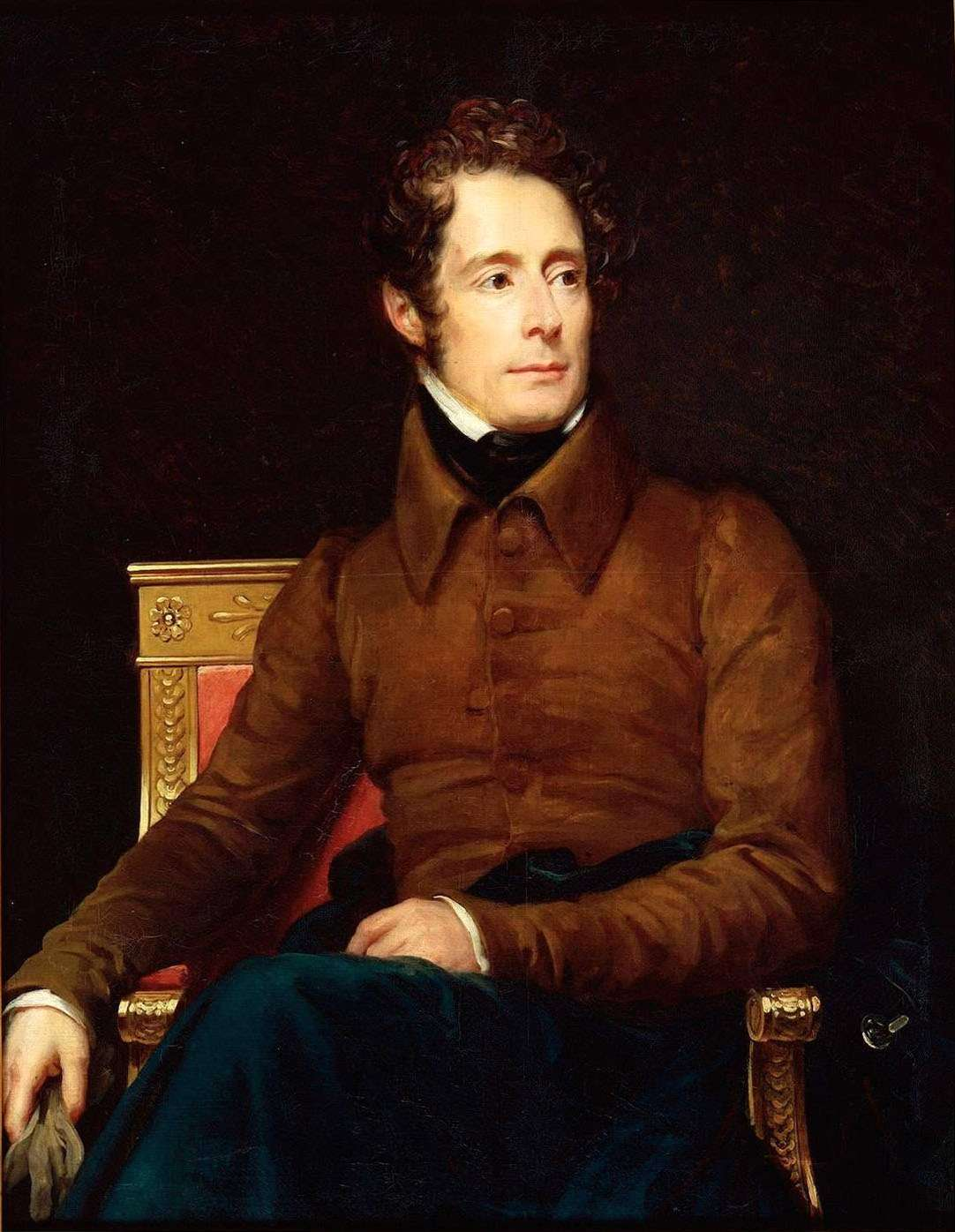
Alphonse de Lamartine

1. Élégie (Elegy), poem by Alphonse de Lamartine

- Déclame (with emphasis)

Satie's very personal lament for Debussy is set to stanza 7 of Lamartine's 1820 poem L'Isolement (Isolation).

What to me are these valleys, these palaces, these cottages
Vain objects from which for me all charm has been taken away?
Rivers, rocks, forests, solitude so dear
A single being is lacking and everything is empty

Robert Orledge observed that in the Élégie "Satie for once brings his inner emotions to the surface in a wide-ranging vocal line of almost exaggerated expressiveness". With its anguished prosody and desolate, tonally ambiguous piano part it is almost unique in Satie's vocal music, comparable only to his 1893 song Bonjour Biqui, Bonjour!. The latter was similarly inspired by an emotional upheaval in the composer's life.

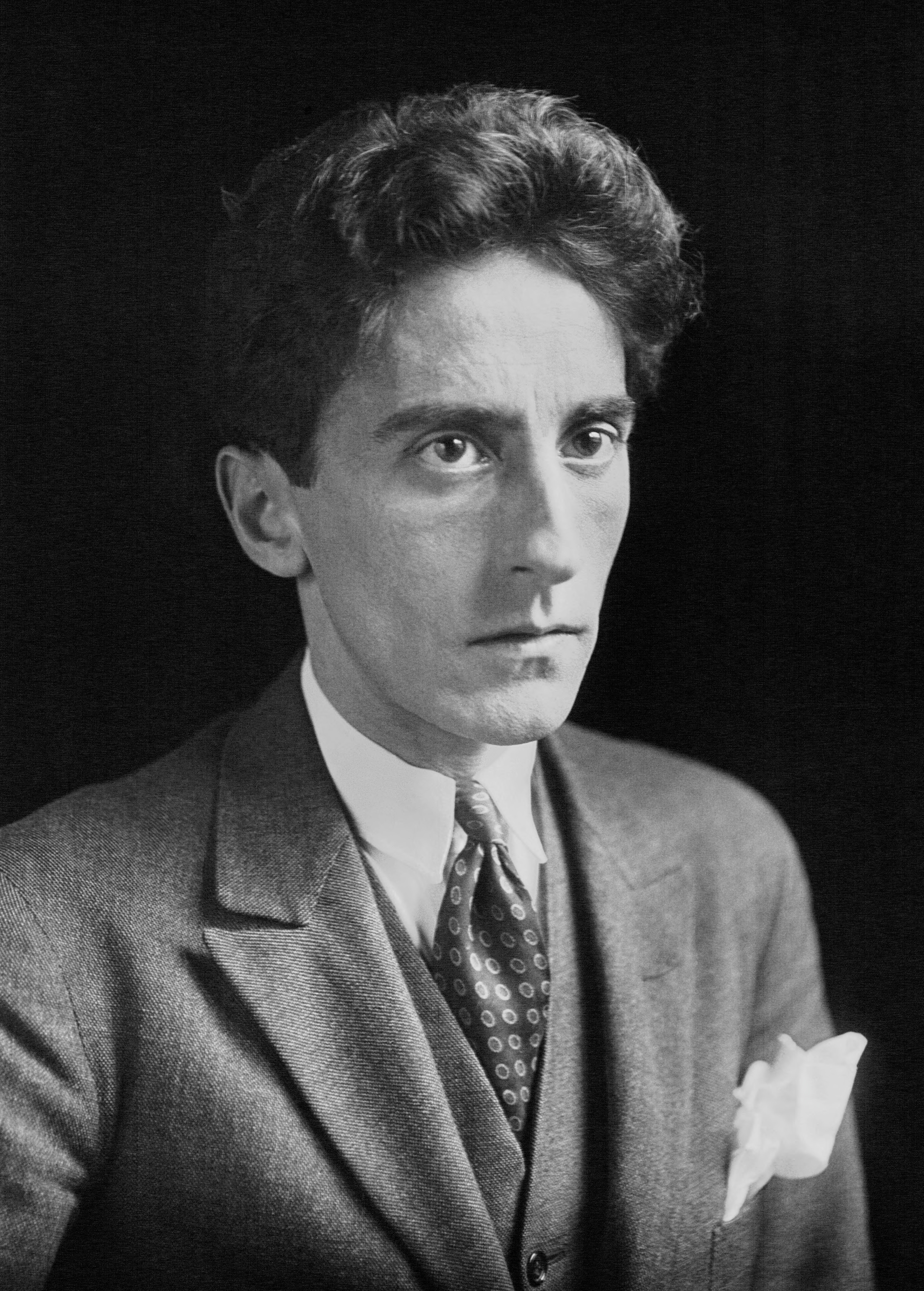
Jean Cocteau

2. Danseuse (Ballerina), poem by Jean Cocteau

- Non vif (not too lively)

Cocteau's poem is a bit of satirical nonsense in which an opera dancer is likened to a crab. An angular, tiptoeing piano accompaniment subtly nails the comparison, suggesting both the sideways movement of the crustacean and en pointe dance technique.

The implications of the absurd text would certainly have attracted Satie. He had strong opinions about ballet performers, who he believed cared only about themselves and for creating "spectacular effects that will bring applause"; and in private correspondence he referred to his frequent collaborator, choreographer Léonide Massine, as "very stupid...and very much a dancer". Satie also loved seafood and had depicted a crab being devoured by an octopus in an earlier composition, La Pieuvre from the piano suite Sports et divertissements (1914).

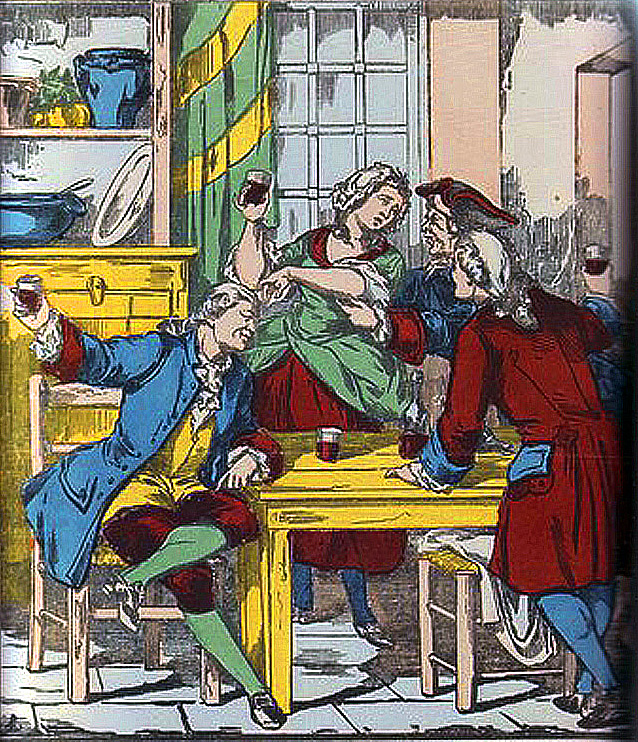
Carousing in an 18th Century French tavern

3. Chanson (Song), poem by anonymous 18th Century French author

- Assez lent (moderately slow)

Dating from pre-revolutionary France of the 1700s, the text is a libertine drinking song (chanson à boire) rife with double-entendres:

It's my treasure, it's my jewel
The pretty hole through which
My vigor wakes up
Yes, I'm crazy, crazy, crazy
About the hole of my bottle

Satie - himself no stranger to alcohol - playfully crafted the vocal line to emulate the slurred speech of an inebriate. After the line "My vigor wakes up" the music stumbles into a brief pause, then shakily resumes.

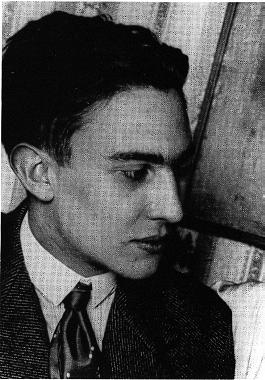
Raymond Radiguet

4. Adieu (Farewell), poem by Raymond Radiguet

- Modéré (moderately)

In 1920 Radiguet was the 17 year-old protégé of Jean Cocteau, long before achieving independent success with his precocious first novel, Le Diable au corps (1923). His contribution to the Quatre petites mélodies was an unpublished quatrain originally entitled Mouchoir (Handkerchief). It would appear in his posthumous poetry collection Les Joues en feu (1925).

A slightly-skewed waltz rhythm underlines the poet taking an old admiral to task for waving a white handkerchief in a gesture of farewell. Radiguet's final verses -

It is the custom to hunt
The flies of the past

- provide a thematic throwback to the opening Élégie and close the cycle with melancholy irony.

== Publication and performance ==
Early promotion of the Quatre Petites Mélodies reflected the piecemeal nature of its composition. Following the original publication of Élégie in the La Revue musicale supplement, Satie's Chanson, retitled Chanson à boire, appeared in facsimile in the 1921 edition of the Parisian Almanach de Cocagne (Cockaigne Almanac). This was an annual publication "dedicated to true gourmets and serious drinkers" edited by Satie's friend, culinary historian Bertrand Guégan. All four songs were published by Éditions de la Sirène in 1922, and subsequently reissued by Eschig.

Mezzo-soprano Jane Bathori and pianist André Salomon gave the first public performance of Élégie at the Galerie la Boétie in Paris on December 19, 1920. Pierre Bertin premiered the complete cycle at the Galerie Georges Giroux in Brussels, Belgium, on April 12, 1921.

The Quatre Petites Mélodies stands as one of Satie's more obscure compositions. Biographer Rollo Myers (1948) found the Élégie "somewhat disconcerting" and felt it did not "quite 'come off'"; he concluded, "At all events it cannot be said that there is any attempt here to imitate Debussy's style". And Patrick Gowers, writing for The New Grove Dictionary of Music and Musicians in 1980, claimed the cycle was "less individual" than Satie's other forays in mélodies. For his part Satie remained fond of the work. On his deathbed in 1925 he told his young admirer Robert Caby, "If you want to learn something about me, look carefully at the Quatre Petites Mélodies. They are very different, aren't they?"

== Recordings ==
Nicolai Gedda and Aldo Ciccolini (La Voix De Son Maître, 1970), Marianne Kweksilber and Reinbert de Leeuw (Harlekijn, 1976, reissued by Philips, 1980), Merielle and Peter Dickinson (Unicorn, 1976), Bruno Laplante and Marc Durand (Calliope, 1985), Rainer Pachner and Ramon Walter (Aurophon, 1988), Eileen Hulse and Robin Bowman (Factory Classical, 1990), Jane Manning and Bojan Gorišek (Audiophile Classics, 1996).
