= Ludions =

1923 song cycle composed by Erik Satie

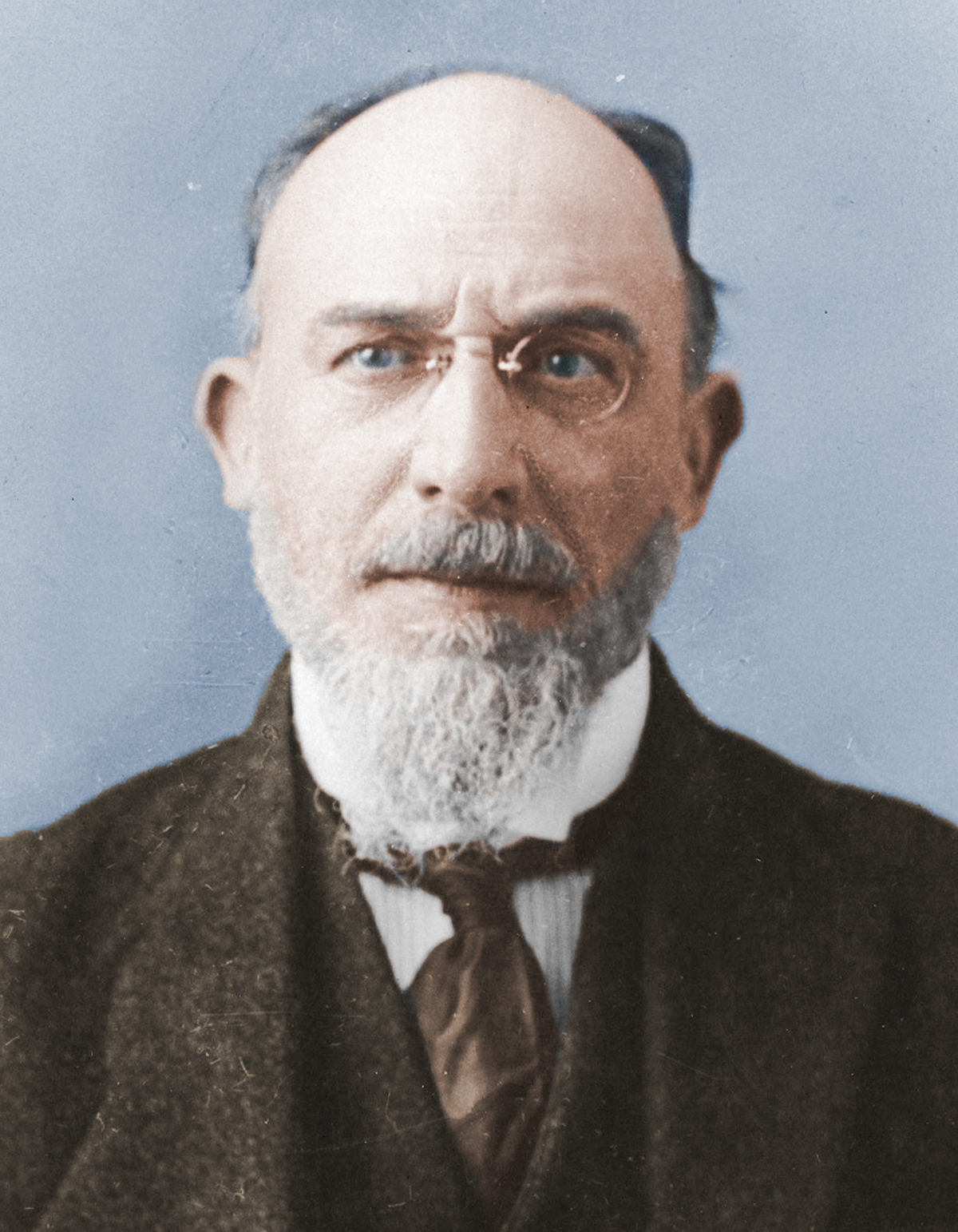
Erik Satie

The Ludions is a song cycle for voice and piano (or organ) by Erik Satie, composed in 1923 to five absurdist poems by Léon-Paul Fargue. It was the last of his vocal compositions. The songs are brief and a performance of the set usually lasts less than five minutes.

Songwriting occupied Satie sporadically throughout his life. He produced popular hits for the music hall (Je te veux, La Diva de l'Empire) as well as mélodies (French art songs) for more discriminating audiences. In the Ludions he fused both genres with the irreverent spirit characteristic of his later music.

Biographer Pierre-Daniel Templier called the cycle "one of Satie's most successful works, due to the perfect correlation between the inspiration of the poet and that of the musician. The familiar playfulness of Fargue's poems, their childish rhythms, their humorous nostalgia, are all delicately rendered by Satie...the irony shines through very clearly."

== Background ==
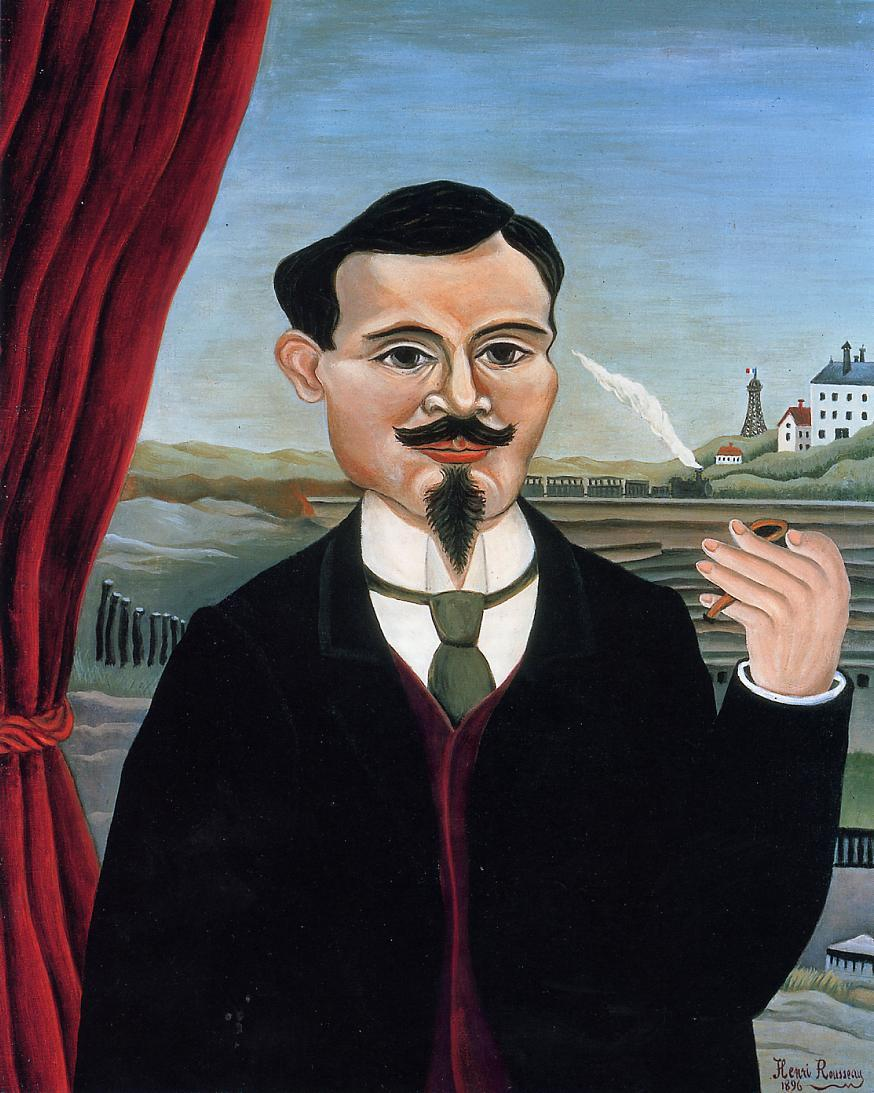
Léon-Paul Fargue by Henri Rousseau, 1896

The eccentric poet, journalist and flâneur Léon-Paul Fargue (1876–1947) has been described as perhaps Satie's "nearest counterpart in literature." Both men were linked with various Parisian avant-garde movements but remained fiercely independent; both drew on absurd humor and childhood as sources of creative inspiration; and they delighted in wordplay and nocturnal strolls around Paris, a city they knew well. During the World War I years, the composer became part of Fargue's intimate circle, the "Potassons", who gathered at Adrienne Monnier's bookshop La Maison des Amis des Livres for readings of his work. Monnier was fascinated with their unusual intellects and recalled that at that time Satie was to Fargue "what the Tashi Lama is to the Dalai Lama."

Satie set Fargue's poem "La statue de bronze" to music in his cycle Trois Mélodies (1916), and the following year, Fargue testified as a character witness in Satie's defense during his prosecution for libel for sending insulting postcards to a music critic. The Ludions would be the chief testament of their friendship – and the cause of its acrimonious end.

== Composition history ==
Fargue first published the Ludions as a series of eight poems in the March 1923 edition of Monnier's house journal Intentions. Satie was then under commission to provide music for Count Étienne de Beaumont's upcoming costume ball, an annual Parisian high society event to which he and Fargue (as leading avant-gardists) were regularly invited, and he happily seized on his friend's idiosyncratic verses to add to the program.

For his setting Satie omitted three of the poems (Air de Julienne, Lanterne and Merdrigal) and rearranged the order of the rest, shifting the Chanson du chat from first to last place to give the cycle a cheerful ending. No changes were made to the texts themselves. The Air du rat gave Satie the most difficulty – he rewrote the song three times before he was satisfied with it.

One of Satie's tasks for the Beaumont fête was to help showcase the newly restored 18th Century pipe organ the Count had installed at his Paris mansion. The two musical numbers he composed for the event – the danced divertissement La statue retrouvée and the Ludions - were to be performed on this instrument. Dismissing fears it would bring a somber note to the festivities, the composer wrote to Countess Edith de Beaumont, "The organ isn't necessarily religious & funereal...Just remember the gilt-painted merry-go-round." Satie's notebooks show he originally conceived the accompaniments for piano, from which he then created separate organ arrangements for the private premiere. The Ludions were completed on May 15, 1923, two weeks before Beaumont's masquerade was due to take place.

== The songs ==
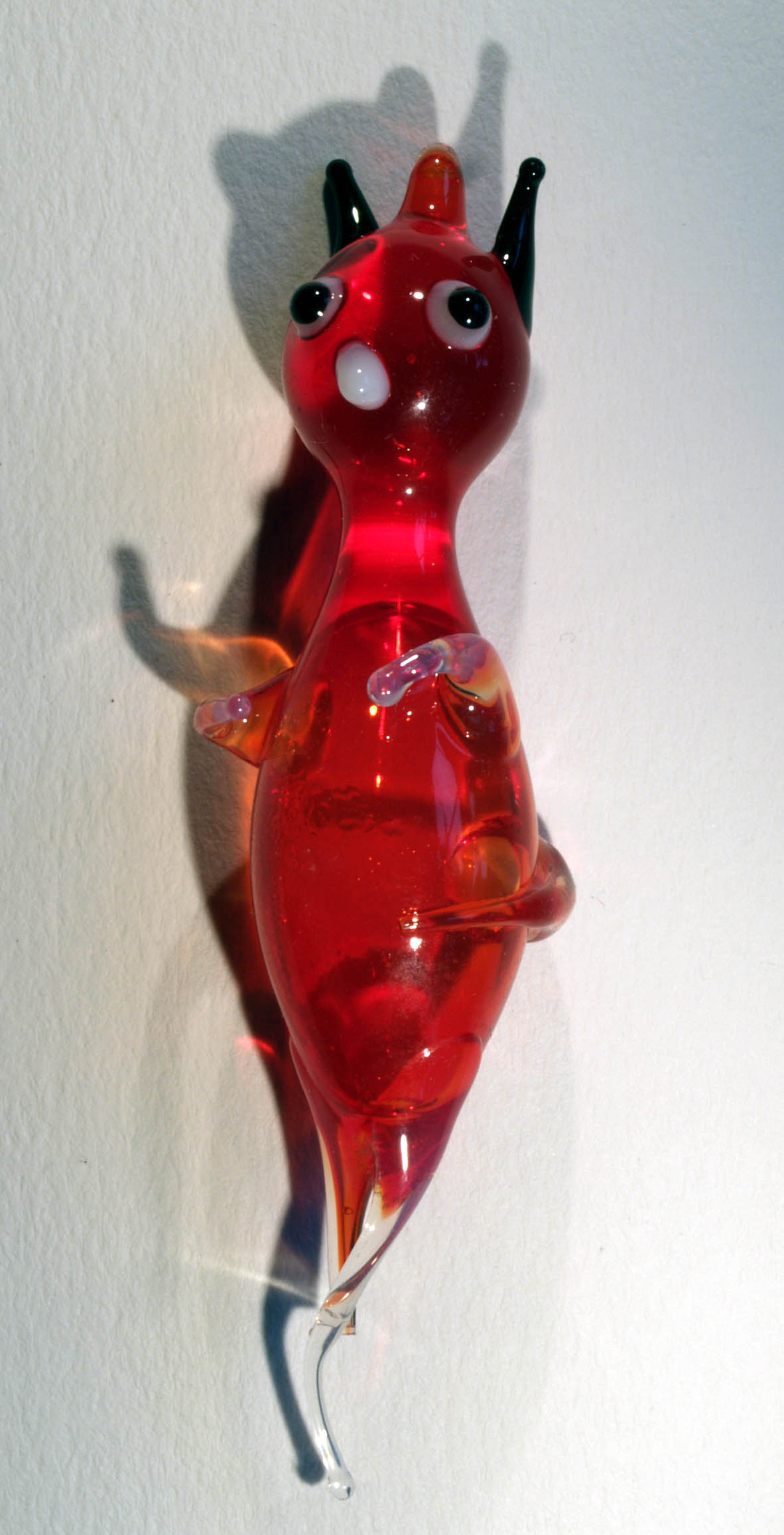
A blown glass devil ludion

A ludion, known in English as a Cartesian diver, is a tiny figurine used as a scientific toy. Placed in a water-filled container that is then made airtight, it can be made to rise, sink and spin by applying external pressure to the liquid. In Fargue's time ludions were often crafted in the forms of devils or imps.

Robert Orledge observed that "Fargue's poems are as important for their sounds and word-play as they are for their literal meanings." Laden with puns, deformed words, obscure allusions and baby talk, they are almost untranslatable.

The five songs are:

1. Air du rat (Rat's Tune) – G major, Tranquille
2. Spleen – C minor, Modéré
3. La grenouille américaine (The American Frog) – A♭ major, Mouvt. de Marche
4. Air du poète (Poet's Tune) – F minor, Grave
5. Chanson du chat (Cat's Song) – F major, Gaiement

=== 1. Air du rat ===
A mock dirge, set to a poem Fargue wrote at age 10 on the death of his pet white rat. There is a fragile tone of lament in the vocal line for the opening verses, hinting at the sadness beneath the author's juvenile terms of endearment for his little friend.

=== 2. Spleen ===
The most serious of the songs portrays a jaded blonde prostitute, sitting like "an ocean of ill-will" on a bench in a public square. Following a chorale-like piano introduction, the music builds by sometimes hesitant steps up to its emphatic climax on the concluding verse, "I'm bored in this cabaret of nothingness which is our life."

=== 3. La grenouille américaine ===
Spry music hall march rhythms accompany this childhood vignette of Fargue being ogled by his pet "fwog", actually a bowl of American broth speckled with gleaming "eyes" of fat. The poet calls it "A love scene."

=== 4. Air du poète ===
On the shores of Papua, the poet makes love to a Papuan and then wishes the person wasn't Papuan. A languid pentatonic melody suggests the exotic setting and lends an ironic gravitas to the text, a bit of nonsense in which Fargue spins variations on the French word "Papouasie."

=== 5. Chanson du chat ===
Fargue wrote this poem in honor of his obese cat Potasson, for whom his friends jokingly nicknamed themselves. Satie's setting is a cabaret-style parody, borrowing the tune of the traditional French children's song Compère Guilleri for the vocal line. Fargue's "Potassons" subsequently adopted the Chanson du chat as their anthem.

== Premiere and aftermath ==
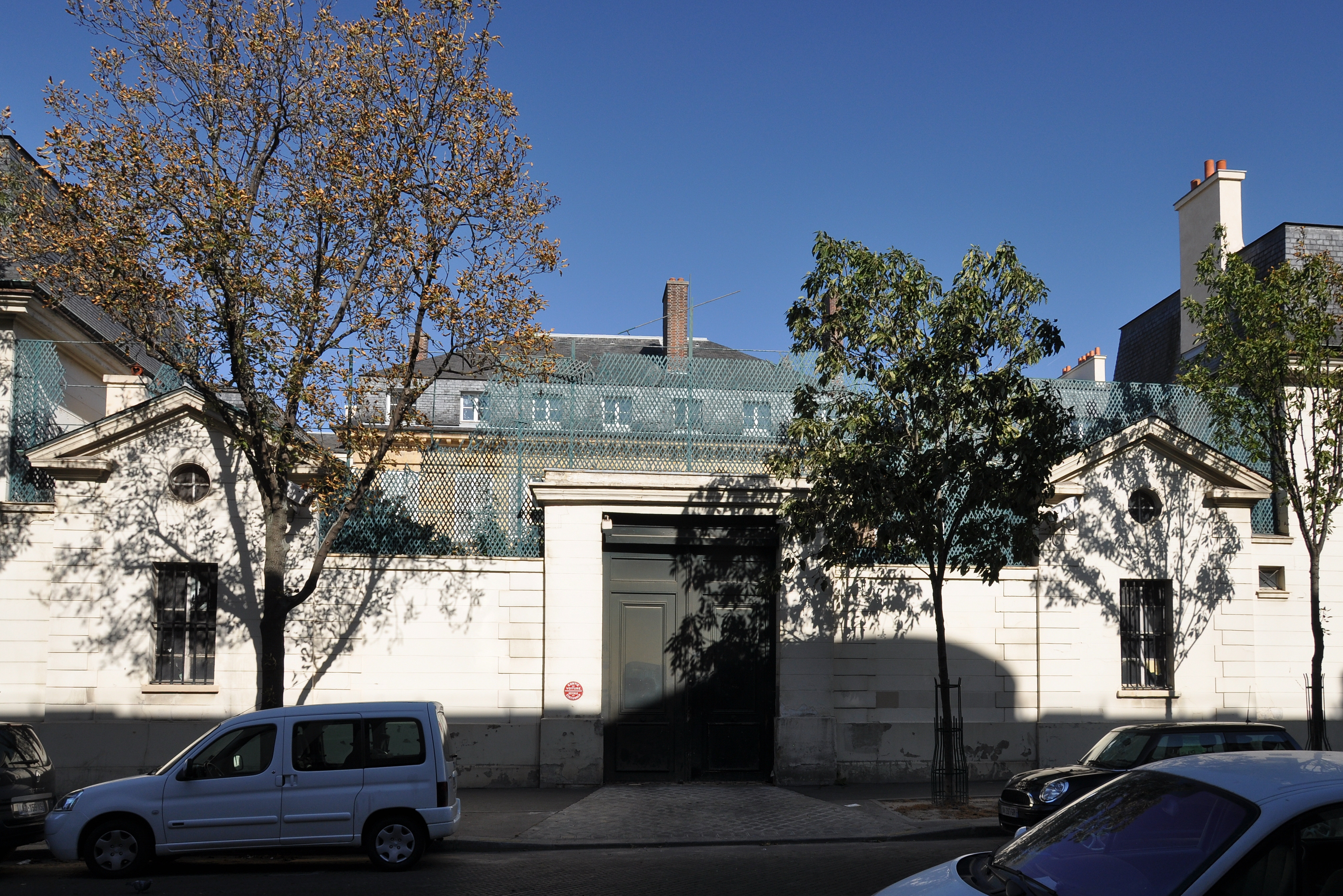
The former Beaumont mansion in the 7th arrondissement of Paris, where the private premiere of the Ludions took place

The Ludions were first performed as part of the extravagant "Baroque Ball" Beaumont held at his home at 2 rue Duroc in Paris on May 30, 1923. Marguerite Jacquemaire (later Countess Marie-Blanche de Polignac) was the soprano soloist, with composer Germaine Tailleferre, the lone female member of Les Six, at the organ. Satie found Jacquemaire's voice "angelic" and Igor Stravinsky reportedly admired the cycle's "perfect word-setting." For the creators, however, the occasion had already been marred by backstage drama.

During a rehearsal on May 29, Fargue noticed that his name had been inadvertently left off the printed program as author of the Ludions. He flew into a rage at Satie (whom he blamed for the oversight) and Beaumont, prompting the Count to challenge him to a duel. "All right," replied Fargue, "but since I'm the offended party I have the right to choose the weapons, and I choose spelling." Beaumont backed down, but a week later an unmollified Satie sent Fargue a curt note demanding an apology. Sylvia Beach recalled his response: "As usual, in Fargue's feuds, he spent a good deal of time and took a lot of trouble to write the most dreadfully insulting things he could think of in daily letters to Satie. Not satisfied with mailing them in Paris, he would go all the way to Arcueil-Cachan, where Satie lived, to slip another insulting note under his door." The hand-delivery showed a particular malice: Satie allowed no one to visit his squalid apartment in Arcueil for the 27 years he lived there, and those who knew him kept their distance out of respect for his privacy. He and Fargue soon cut off all communication with each other. Ironically, Satie himself was notorious for ending friendships over slight and even imaginary offenses, and the break with Fargue was a rare instance of the tables being turned on him. According to Beach, Satie could only laugh about it.

The Ludions were publicly premiered at the Salle des Agriculteurs in Paris on December 21, 1923. Satie accompanied mezzo-soprano Jane Bathori in his original setting of the songs for voice and piano, and this version became standard.

One of Satie's final acts as a professional musician, on his deathbed in a Paris hospital in 1925, was to sign a contract with Jacques Lerolle of Rouart, Lerolle & Cie for the publication of the Ludions. Lerolle urged Fargue to visit the dying composer, to no avail; nor did the poet attend Satie's funeral in July. The songs were issued in 1926. Fargue re-published his complete texts as an illustrated booklet in 1930. In later years he wrote of Satie as "a true master" and privately remembered him with relish.

In 2011 Robert Orledge published a corrected edition of the Ludions, including the alternative organ part for those interested in replicating the first private performance.

== Recordings ==
Notable recordings include those by Mady Mesplé with Aldo Ciccolini, piano (EMI, 1970), Elaine Bonazzi with Frank Glazer (Candide, 1970, reissued by Vox 1994), Marjanne Kweksilber with Reinbert de Leeuw (Harlekijn, 1976, reissued by Philips Classics 2006), Hugues Cuénod (Nimbus, 1985), Bruno Laplante (Calliope, 1985), Elly Ameling with Rudolf Jansen (Philips, 1986), Sigune von Osten (ITM Classics, 1994), Jane Manning with Bojan Gorišek (Audiophile Classics, 1994, reissued 2002), Anne-Sophie Schmidt with Jean-Pierre Armengaud (Mandala, 1999), Della Jones (Chandos, 1999), Anne-May Krüger (Wergo, 2008), Jean Delescluse with Alexandre Tharaud (Harmonia Mundi, 2009), and Eva Lind (Solo Musica, 2014).
