= Pièce d'occasion =

A pièce d'occasion (pronounced [pjɛs dɔkazjɔ̃]) like the word pièce meaning preparing and d'occasion meaning for a special occasion suggests a composition, dance or theatrical piece composed, often commissioned, for a festive occasion.

== Examples ==
- The Dying Swan, ballet by Mikhail Fokine (to Camille Saint-Saëns's cello solo Le cygne) for the ballerina Anna Pavlova (1905)
- Fanfare for a Prince, ballet by John Taras (1956)
- Dance Preludes, ballet by Miriam Mahdaviani (1991)
- FOR 4, dance by Christopher Wheeldon (to Franz Schubert's Death and the Maiden) (2006)
- Silla, opera seria by Handel (1713)
- Elvida, opera by Gaetano Donizetti (1826)
- Entrez, messieurs, mesdames, pièce d'occasion by Offenbach (1855)
- Les dragées du baptême, pièce d'occasion by Offenbach (1856)
- La statue retrouvée (1923), an entertainment for a private costume ball in Paris with music by Erik Satie, scenario by Jean Cocteau, designs by Pablo Picasso and choreography by Leonide Massine.
- How He Lied to Her Husband, playlet by George Bernard Shaw (1905).

== See also ==
- Occasional poetry
