= Le Bœuf sur le toit =

Ballet by Darius Milhaud

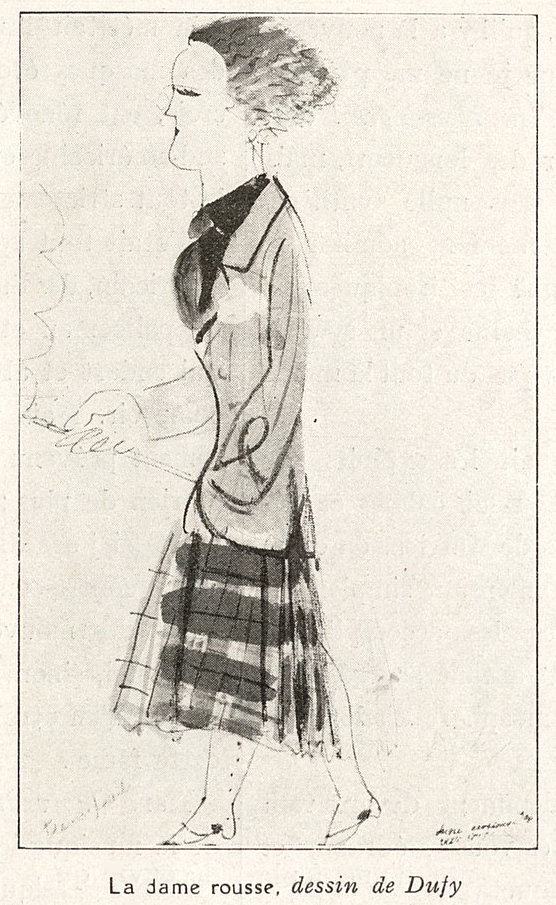
- Design by Raoul Dufy for the Red-Haired Lady character (La Dame Rousse) of the eponymous ballet
- Choreographer: Jean Cocteau
- Music: Darius Milhaud
- Premiere: 21 February 1920; Comédie des Champs-Élysées, Paris
- Genre: Surrealist ballet

Le Bœuf sur le toit (literally "the ox on the roof"), Op. 58 is a 15-minute piece for small orchestra by the composer Darius Milhaud, written in 1919–20. Milhaud conceived the piece as incidental music for any one of the comic silent films of Charlie Chaplin, but it received its premiere as the music for a ballet staged by Jean Cocteau in February 1920.

== Music ==
Milhaud said that he composed Le Bœuf sur le toit as "fifteen minutes of music, rapid and gay, as a background to any Charlie Chaplin silent movie". The composer spent two years in Brazil in the French diplomatic service during the First World War, and was influenced by its music in his own compositions. There have been various explanations of the title: the musicologist James Harding mentions one, that the title was taken from the sign-board of a tavern, and another, that it is from an old Parisian legend of a man in a top-floor flat who insisted on keeping a calf, which grew into a large ox, too big to be removed. It is also worth noting that "Faire un boeuf" in French translates to "to do a jam session". During WW1 assemblies were not allowed, therefore concert halls were closed, many musicians would meet in cafés or similar places. Some cafés were too small for ensembles and would practice on the roof of the establishment. When Madeleine Milhaud visited Mills College in the early eighties, Emmanuel of Radio à la Carte was able to have a conversation with her about her husband's playing before they moved to California for a while. She shared that when people asked where they could hear the new young musicians, they would be told that the "Boeuf est sur le toit", the jam sessions is taking place on the roof. Milhaud himself said that it was the title of a Brazilian folk dance.

=== Analysis ===
The musicologist Robert Matthew-Walker calls the work "a rondeau-avec-reprises, a stylization of Rameau and Couperin". The music cycles through all the major keys and some minor ones. Milhaud quoted extensively from Brazilian tunes. An analysis published in 2002 cites more than 20 pieces by 14 Brazilian composers referred to in the score. One of them is Ernesto Nazareth's Escovado.The lively opening motif – Milhaud's own invention and not a borrowing – recurs throughout:

Opening theme of Le Bœuf sur le tout

It is interspersed with several subsidiary themes, principally a syncopated melody for strings, an elegant theme for woodwind and a brassy theme for trumpets. They are developed into a rhapsodic passage for strings, and another with a strong Latin-American flavour. As the work nears its conclusion the themes are brought together in an exuberant coda. The analyst Richard Whitehouse writes, "The music is permeated by polytonal inflections that are a common feature of Milhaud's music in this period, giving it unexpected harmonic twists, while ensuring that the work's melodic and rhythmic appeal are never in doubt".

=== Instrumentation and arrangements ===
The original scoring calls for a chamber orchestra comprising two flutes, one doubling piccolo; one oboe; two clarinets in B♭; one bassoon; two horns in F; two trumpets in C; one trombone; one percussionist playing güiro, (Note: The score suggests a washboard as an alternative.) tambourine, bass drum and cymbals; and strings.

Milhaud made several arrangements of the score: for violin and orchestra, violin and piano (with cadenza by his colleague from Les Six, Arthur Honegger), and two pianos.

== Ballet ==
Cocteau's 1920 production; décor by Raoul Dufy

Jean Cocteau persuaded Milhaud to let the music be used for a ballet. Cocteau wrote the scenario and the Fratellini clowns and the Medreno Circus provided the cast. The production was to have been designed by Guy-Pierre Fauconnel, but he died suddenly with his designs incomplete; Raoul Dufy took over. The premiere was given on 21 February 1920 at the Comédie des Champs-Élysées in a programme that also included Francis Poulenc's overture Cocardes, the ballet Adieu New York by Georges Auric, three settings by Poulenc of verses by Cocteau, and Trois petites pièces montées by Erik Satie. The conductor was Vladimir Golschmann.

The action is described by Harding as "pleasantly devoid of all meaning". The characters, mostly from the less respectable levels of Parisian society, are the Black Boxer, the Barman, the Jockey, the Black Billiard Player, the Red-Haired Lady, the Décolletée Lady, the Man in Evening Dress, and the Policeman. All wear cardboard heads two or three times life-size. The boxer finds his cigar drawing badly and the barman cuts it for him with a pistol shot. The bullet strikes down the billiard player. The jockey takes exception to the boxer's overtures to the red-headed lady and knocks him down, before joining the female customers in a tango. A police whistle is heard; the barman hides all evidence of alcohol and disguises the room as a milk-bar. A large policeman enters, smells the breath of the customers and dances a genial solo. The barman presses a button: an electric fan comes down from the ceiling and cuts off the policeman's head. He falls dead, and one of the female customers dances with his severed head, in a parody of Salome. The barman replaces the head on the body of the policeman, who revives, but is confronted with a huge bill, several metres long, for everybody's drinks. Despite the liveliness of the music, the characters dance in slow motion, "like deep-sea divers moving against the current", in Harding's phrase.

The ballet was well received in Paris, and Cocteau and Milhaud took it to London, (Note: Milhaud's stay in London was important for his later music: he first encountered live jazz at the Hammersmith Palais, made a thorough study of the genre and drew on it for some of his later works.) where Hugo Rumbold presented it under the title The Nothing Doing Bar. It was so successful at the London Coliseum – drawing five encores at the first night – that the management sent a touring company out with it.

The ballet gave its name to a celebrated Parisian cabaret-bar, Le Bœuf sur le toit, which opened in 1921 and became a meeting-place for Cocteau and his associates. Milhaud was given life membership. He noted later that the piece had also given its name to bars in Brussels and New York.

== Notes, references and sources ==
=== Sources ===
- Ferguson, Donald (1968). Masterworks of the Orchestral Repertoire: A Guide for Listeners. Minneapolis: University of Minnesota Press. OCLC 471191091.
- Harding, James (1972). The Ox on the Roof: Scenes from Musical Life in Paris in the Twenties. London: Macdonald. ISBN 978-0-356-03967-1.
