= Cinq Grimaces pour Le Songe d'une nuit d'été =

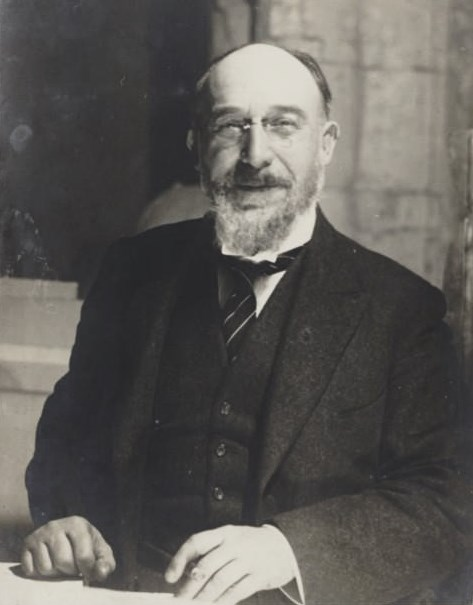
Erik Satie

The Cinq Grimaces pour Le Songe d'une nuit d'été (Five Grimaces for A Midsummer Night's Dream) is a set of incidental music pieces for orchestra by Erik Satie. Composed in 1915 for a planned circus-style staging of Shakespeare's play A Midsummer Night's Dream, it marked the composer's first collaboration with author Jean Cocteau. The production failed to materialize and Satie's music went unperformed in his lifetime. His score was published posthumously in 1929.

== Background ==
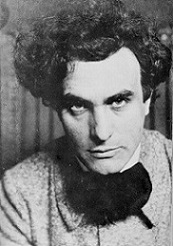
Edgard Varèse

In early 1915, composer Edgard Varèse proposed an idea for a French World War I propaganda production of Shakespeare's comedy to theatrical impresario Gabriel Astruc. Varèse had served as chorus master for director Max Reinhardt's 1913 revival of A Midsummer Night's Dream in Berlin, using Mendelssohn's famous incidental score; now he hoped to mount a comparable spectacle in Paris to prove that Shakespeare was an "ally" of the French and not of the Germans. He intended to replace Mendelssohn's accompaniments with a potpourri of French music composed for the occasion by Satie, Florent Schmitt, Maurice Ravel, himself, and - not quite in keeping with the theme - Igor Stravinsky. It would be staged as a benefit for the war wounded. Astruc agreed to serve as producer with Firmin Gémier directing. The literary adaptation was entrusted to the ambitious young Right Bank author Jean Cocteau, venturing into the bohemian Left Bank scene of Paris for the first time. He brashly called his condensed version of Shakespeare "word for word with extensive cuts," even though he did not know English and based his work on existing French translations.

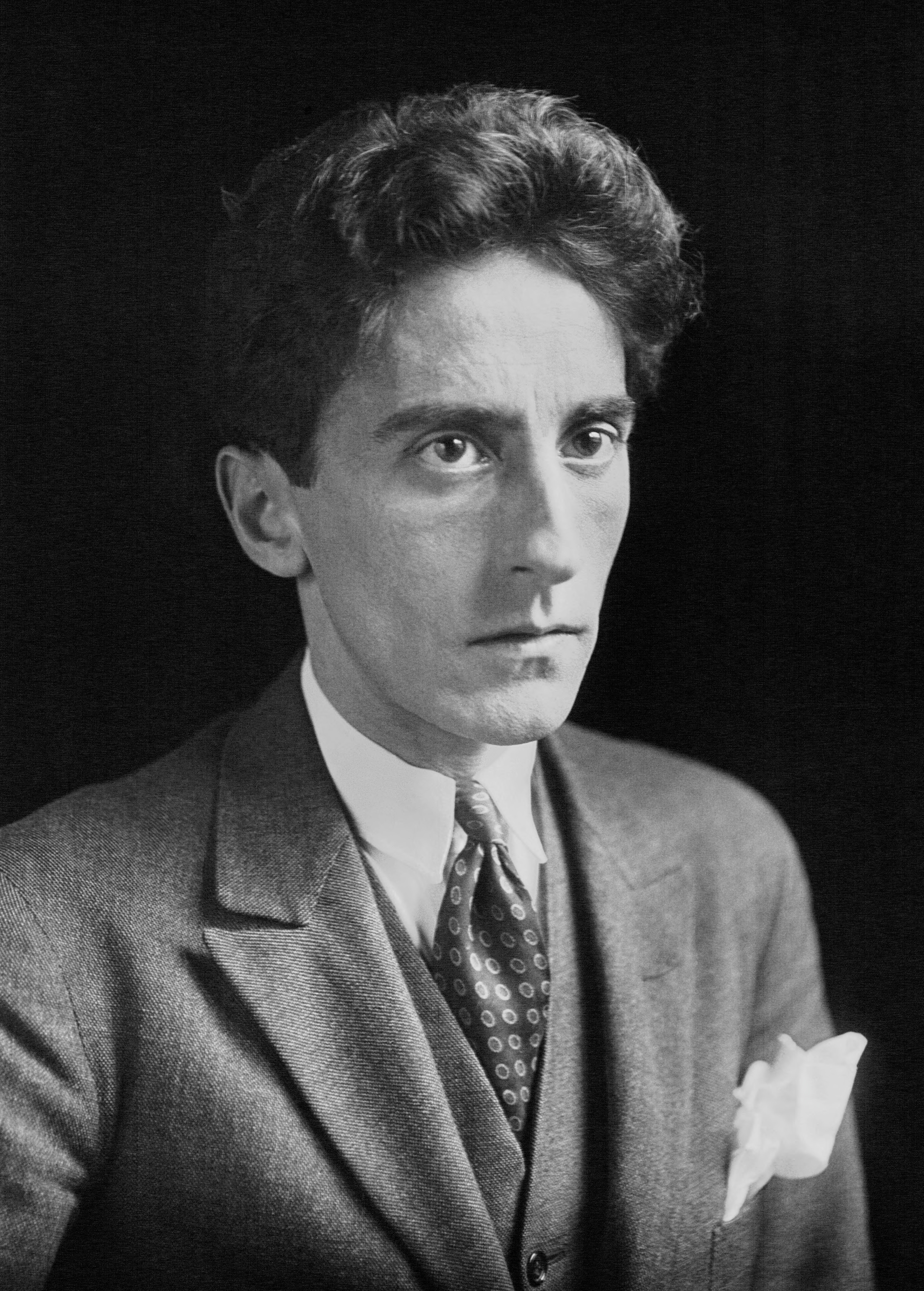
Jean Cocteau

As most Paris theatres were closed due to the war, it was decided to produce the play at the well-known circus the Cirque Medrano near Montmartre with a cast of primarily comic entertainers and acrobats. At Cocteau's suggestion, the roles of Bottom, Flute and Starveling were assigned to the Medrano's star clowns the Fratellini Brothers. Cocteau also enlisted Cubist painters Albert Gleizes and André Lhote to design the settings, some of which were to consist of colored "shadows" projected onto the backdrops. In June 1915 Varèse introduced Cocteau to the foremost Cubist painter, Pablo Picasso. Picasso did not take part in the production, but the meeting marked the beginning of his lifelong friendship with Cocteau.

Rehearsals began in the autumn of 1915. On October 18 Satie and Cocteau met for the first time at the home of artist Valentine Gross to discuss the project. Since Satie was the only composer who had come through with his part of the commission, it was evidently decided to supplement his musical numbers with popular World War I-era songs. American critic Carl Van Vechten reported that the character Oberon, King of the Fairies, was to have made his grand entrance to the tune of It's a Long Way to Tipperary.

Wartime conditions ultimately doomed the undertaking. In November Varèse and Gleizes left France for the United States, and the following month Cocteau was called up to serve in a French Army ambulance unit. The rehearsals for A Midsummer Night's Dream, which Astruc thought showed great promise, were terminated soon after. Only Satie's music survives from this aborted production.

== Music ==
Varèse greatly admired Satie, and as a tribute he commissioned his elder colleague to provide the bulk of the incidental score for A Midsummer Night's Dream, including the opening and closing numbers. The other composers were to have contributed one piece each. According to Varèse the music would have been performed in this order: Satie-Schmitt-Satie-Ravel-Satie-Stravinsky-Satie-Varèse-Satie. Cocteau's adaptation is lost so it is impossible to determine how Satie's three central numbers would have corresponded to the action, though given their humorous titles and musical character, it seems he wrote them with the Fratellini clowns in mind.

The score calls for a circus orchestra of 1 piccolo, 1 flute, 1 oboe, 1 cor anglais, 1 clarinet, 1 bassoon, 1 contrabassoon, 2 trumpets, 2 trombones, 1 tuba, percussion for 2 players (timpani, snare drum, cymbals, bass drum), and strings. Satie's pieces are characteristically terse and a performance of the complete set lasts under 4 minutes.

1. Préambule (Preamble)
2. Coquecigrue (Fiddle-faddle)
3. Chasse (Chase)
4. Fanfaronnade (Bluster)
5. Pour sortir (For Exit)

The music has many of the hallmarks of Satie's "humoristic" phase of the 1910s, featuring bitonal harmonies, acrid dissonances, and cheeky allusions to popular material. His borrowings include snippets of the French hunting signal Le Réveil, the military bugle call Retreat, and Offenbach's can-can Le Rondeau du brésilien, which he incongruously managed to turn into a polka. "The scoring and the continual oom-pah capture the ambiance of a circus processional, with pratfalls along the way", Steven Moore Whiting noted.

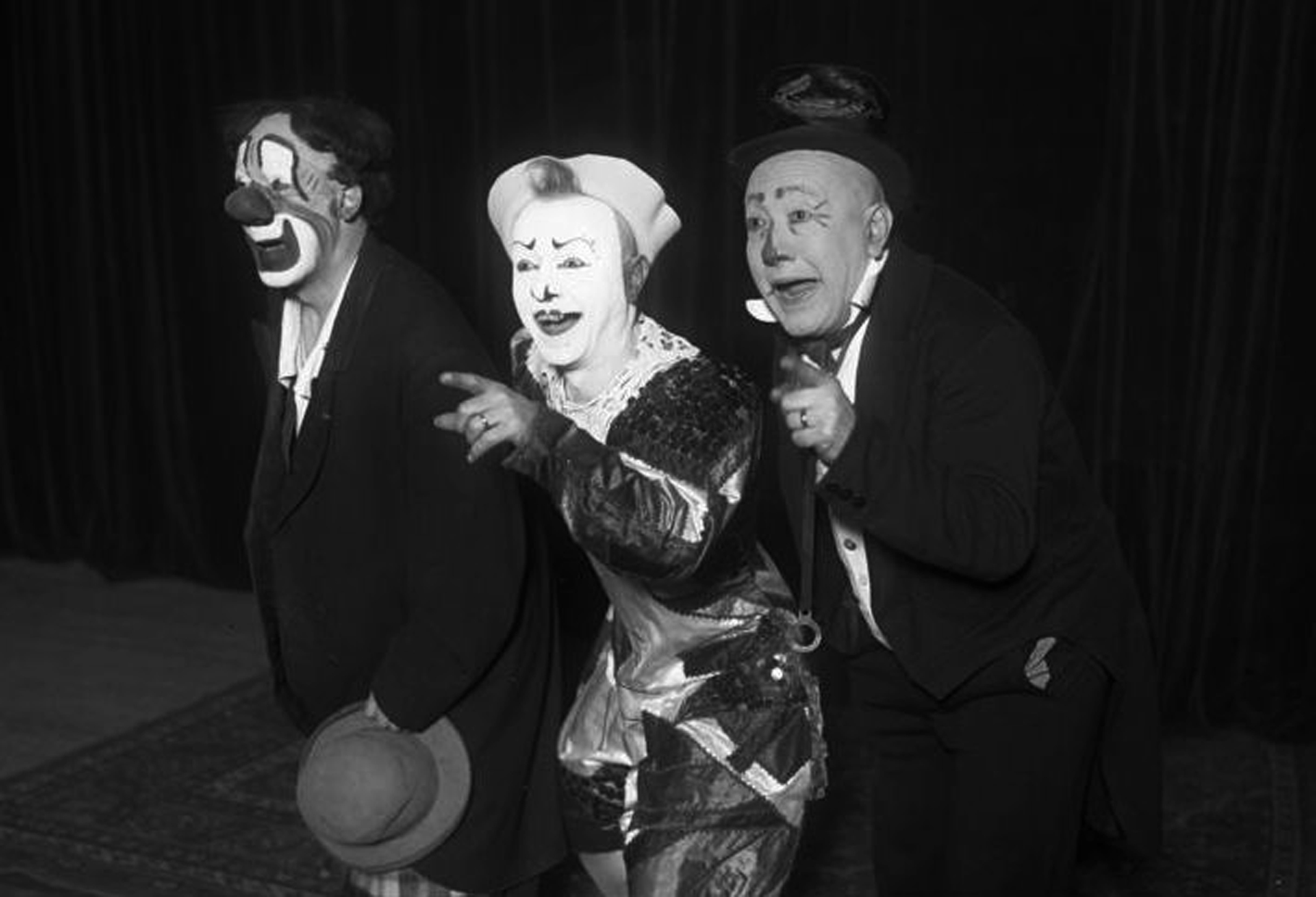
The Fratellini Brothers, who had major roles in the aborted 1915 Paris production of A Midsummer Night's Dream

Satie's later refusal to perform or publish the Cinq Grimaces - the only mature orchestral composition he suppressed - is one of the more curious episodes of his career. Satie scholar Ornella Volta observed that "Varèse later claimed to have contributed to the orchestration of this score. It was just the kind of assistance that Satie - who was often accused of 'not knowing how to orchestrate' - hardly appreciated." In February 1916, when Varèse asked his permission to perform the Cinq Grimaces in the United States, Satie not only declined but, "almost certainly from a need for revenge", sent as a substitute a score by one of his obscure pupils which he had orchestrated himself. And when Cocteau wanted to program the Cinq Grimaces as part of his celebrated "Spectacle-Concert" in Paris in February 1920, Satie again refused and composed his Trois petites pièces montées instead.

A final mystery about the Cinq Grimaces lies in the manuscript. Satie only noted completion dates on his finished scores, and his neat copy of the Cinq Grimaces is dated April 2, 1915. But it is incomplete - just the first six bars of the concluding Pour sortir are extant. Satie's friend and music executor Darius Milhaud completed this piece in November 1925, after Satie's death.

Roger Désormière conducted the first performance of the Cinq Grimaces on May 17, 1926, during a "Hommage à Satie" concert at the Théâtre des Champs-Élysées in Paris. In 1928 Milhaud published his solo piano reduction of the work through Universal Edition, which issued the original orchestral score the following year.

== Conclusion ==
Although this incarnation of A Midsummer Night's Dream never reached the stage, it had important repercussions, in particular for Cocteau. It allowed him to set foot in Left Bank Paris, which he called "the front line of the art war." Through it he was introduced to Picasso and began a stormy eight-year association with Satie, whom he would promote as representing the future of French music. Cocteau's varied interests in Cubism, contemporary music, and popular culture began to coalesce and would come to fruition in the revolutionary Satie-Picasso-Cocteau-Massine ballet Parade, produced by Sergei Diaghilev's Ballets Russes in 1917.

== Recordings ==
For orchestra: Maurice Abravanel and the Utah Symphony Orchestra (Vanguard, 1968), Michel Plasson and the Orchestre Du Capitole De Toulouse (EMI Classics, 1988). For solo piano: Bojan Gorišek (Audiophile Classics, 1994), Jean-Yves Thibaudet (Decca, 2002). Other arrangements: "The Electronic Spirit Of Erik Satie", Camarata Contemporary Chamber Orchestra (London Records, 1972).
