= La Statue retrouvée =

Composition by Erik Satie

La Statue retrouvée (The Discovered Statue) is a short composition for trumpet and organ by Erik Satie. Commissioned as a danced pièce d'occasion, it was originally set to a scenario by Jean Cocteau and featured choreography by Léonide Massine and costumes designed by Pablo Picasso. Its only performance in this form took place in Paris on May 30, 1923.

The work is notable for reuniting the creative team behind Serge Diaghilev's landmark 1917 ballet Parade. Today only Satie's music survives.

== History ==
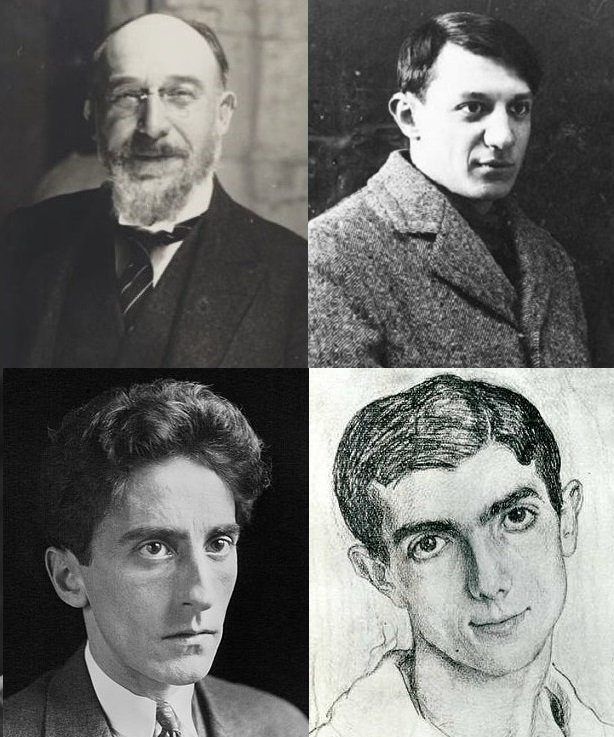
The creators of La statue retrouvée (clockwise from top left): Erik Satie, Pablo Picasso, Léonide Massine, Jean Cocteau

In December 1922, Satie was invited by Count Étienne de Beaumont (1883-1956) and his wife Edith (1877-1952) to compose a divertissement for their upcoming annual masquerade ball, a glamorous high society affair. Its theme was "The Antiquity of Louis XIV" and the entertainment would consist of a series of musical tableaux vivants performed by select members among the distinguished guests. One of Satie's tasks was to help showcase the newly restored 18th Century pipe organ the couple had installed in the gilded music room of their Paris mansion. He had written nothing for the instrument since his (yet unperformed) 1895 Messe des pauvres, but welcomed the challenge.

Satie's frequent collaborator Cocteau managed to involve himself in the project, even though their relations were deteriorating by then. This would be their final work together, and it began with a disagreement. "I'm very surprised to see that [Cocteau] shares the prejudice of the masses against the organ," Satie wrote to Edith de Beaumont on December 26. "Odd, isn't it?...I very much hope to win him over to our cause - our good cause." Dismissing fears it would bring a somber note to the festivities, he added, "The organ isn't necessarily religious & funereal...Just remember the gilt-painted merry-go-round." One week later he was able to inform the Countess, "Jean just gave me a good idea concerning it (the Divertissement)...It's not stupid, you'll see." Cocteau's scenario was set in the Rococo era and involved two young women searching for a mythical lost statue. When discovered the statue springs to life.

The piece acquired additional prestige thanks to Satie's wide connections in the Parisian cultural scene. By April 1923 he had brought in Picasso to create the wardrobe and Massine to regulate the choreography. Count Beaumont, who dabbled in costume and theatre design, gave Picasso specific instructions, demanding "women in shades of gold with white wigs and masks...men in shades of brown with golden wigs, and draperies over their formal costumes...needless to say the costumes should be of utmost fantasy made from stuffs of utmost simplicity." Picasso also offered to paint four large grisaille panels on classical subjects to serve as backdrops for the masquerade. Beaumont enthusiastically agreed, but Picasso's dealer Paul Rosenberg persuaded the artist to drop that idea as too unremunerative for the amount of work involved.

Satie was wary of choreographers. While working on the Divertissement he described Massine as "very stupid...and very much a dancer." In a letter on March 23 he suggested to Countess Beaumont that he should not compose the music until Massine had designed the movements of the characters - a novel concept at the time. He later confided to the painter Moïse Kisling that this unusual procedure was the only way he could protect his music from being misinterpreted: "The choreographer cares only about himself; the female dancer cares only for spectacular effects that will bring applause. And who cares about the composer - about his sensibility, indeed, about his message? No one!"

In the meantime he started composing a second entertainment for the masquerade, the Ludions, a song cycle to poems by his friend Léon-Paul Fargue; it was also to have organ accompaniment. Satie admitted this turned out to be "the most complicated" number and it occupied him through mid-May, causing some anxiety over his part in the Divertissement. On May 14 he wrote to reassure Edith de Beaumont, "From Friday [May 18] on I shall be at the disposal of the dancers. We shall be ready, have no fear as far as my work is concerned."

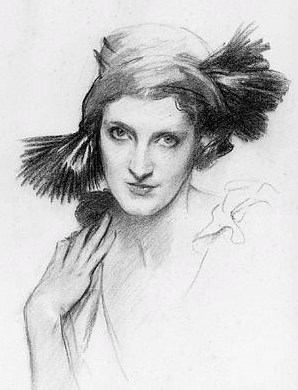
Daisy Fellowes, who danced the title role of La Statue retrouvée. Portrait by John Singer Sargent

Massine left no record of his choreography, though like Satie's music it would have been simple and dignified to accommodate the upper crust amateur participants. Olga Picasso, formerly of the Ballets Russes, was the only professional danseuse in the small ensemble. She and the Marquise de Médicis were cast as the searchers and were each given a solo dance. The role of the Statue was initially assigned to Marguerite Jacquemaire (the future Countess Marie-Blanche de Polignac), who would also perform as the soprano soloist for the Ludions, but she proved to be more talented as a singer than as a dancer. On May 24 - less than a week before the event - Massine replaced her with Daisy Fellowes, niece of the Princesse de Polignac and an heiress to the Singer sewing machine fortune. Satie was thrilled with the chic, uninhibited Fellowes, who in the interwar years acquired a considerable reputation as a high society "bad girl". "At last! I find an interpreter with some initiative", he enthused to Edith de Beaumont, adding that her rehearsals had left him "flabbergasted." He quickly composed a new number for her, the march-like Entrée, and revised the concluding Retraite to add a trumpet flourish illustrating the statue's awakening to life. Satie's final manuscript suggests the effect the socialite had on him. It is simply titled, "Organ: Mme Fellowes."

Throughout its planning and rehearsal stages the piece was referred to as a Divertissement. The title La Statue retrouvée was apparently a last-minute addition to the program. Satie never used it, either in his correspondence or on the score itself. This would play a role in the music's subsequent decades of obscurity.

== Music ==
Satie's slender score – 53 bars in length – is divided into five sections: entrance music, two quests for the lost statue, a duet for its discovery, and exit music. Given its brevity the music for each number was probably repeated in performance.

1. Entrée – Mouvement de Marche (♩ = 80)
2. 1ère Recherche
3. 2ème Recherche
4. À deux (vers la statue)
5. Retraite (with trumpet in C)

== Performance ==
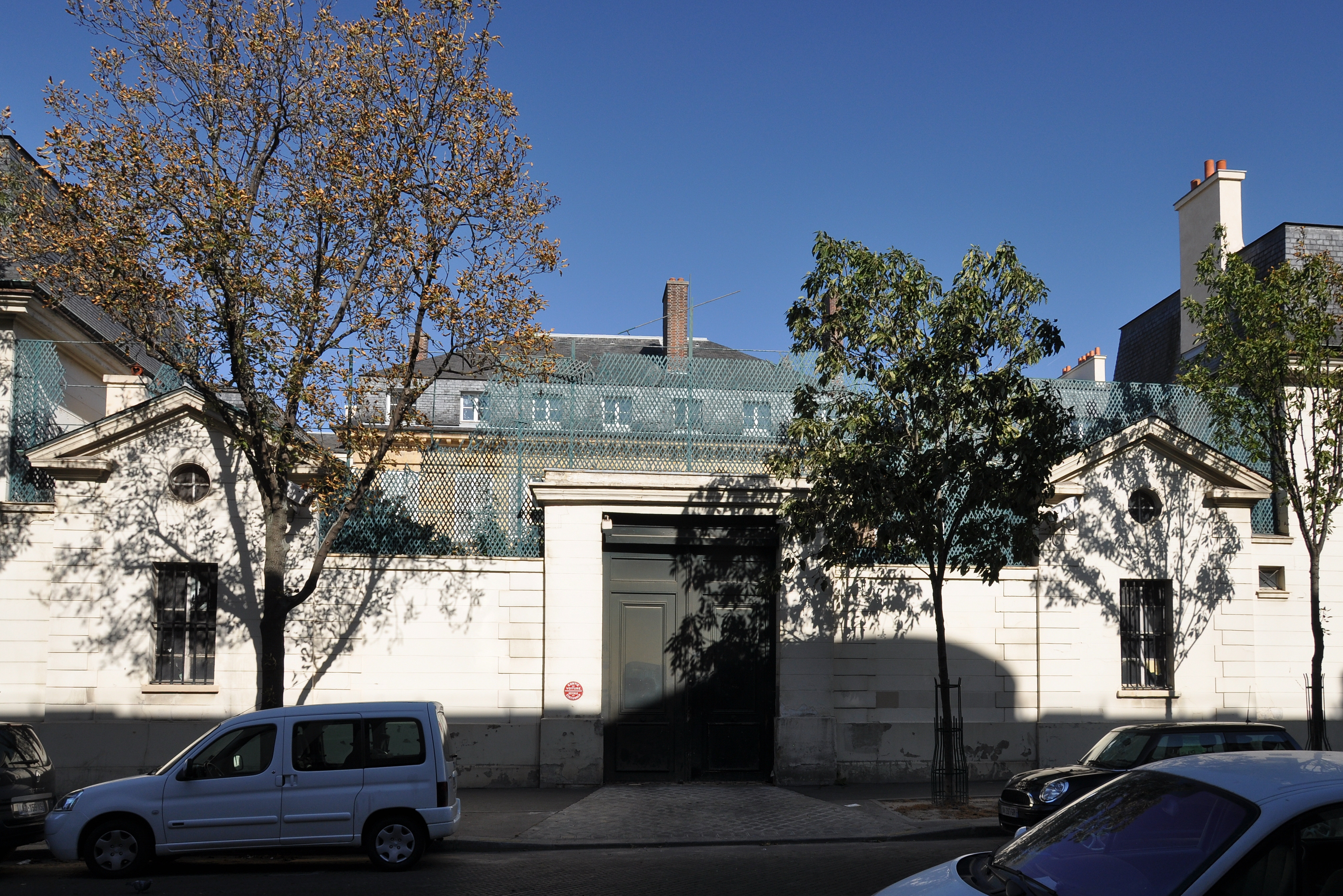
The former Beaumont mansion in the 7th arrondissement of Paris

La Statue retrouvée was premiered as the grand finale of the extravagant "Baroque Ball" the Beaumonts held at their estate at 2 rue Duroc in Paris on May 30, 1923. Massine and the Beaumonts danced small roles in La Statue while composer Germaine Tailleferre, the lone female member of Les Six, performed the organ score. The event attracted Le Tout-Paris and was covered in the July and August 1923 issues of French Vogue.

Incidentally, among those in attendance that evening was the precocious 19-year-old author Raymond Radiguet. He would base his second (and last) novel Le Bal du comte d'Orgel (Count d'Orgel's Ball, 1924) on the Beaumonts.

== Conclusion ==
The fates of Satie's two compositions for the Beaumont fête could hardly have been more different. He arranged for the publication of the Ludions shortly before his death in 1925, and it has long been considered one of his finest works. La statue retrouvée was set aside and forgotten. Satie's first biographers Pierre-Daniel Templier (1932) and Rollo H. Myers (1948) made no mention of it, and as nothing under that title was found in his posthumous papers, the music was long thought lost. In the 1980s Robert Orledge discovered the "Mme Fellowes" manuscript among the composer's notebooks at the Bibliothèque nationale de France and confirmed it was the missing score for La statue. He first published it in his book Satie the Composer (1990) and edited a performing edition published by Salabert in 1997. Orledge conceded it was "hardly first-rate Satie."

In retrospect La statue retrouvée is more notable for its creative pedigree and for what it caused to happen. The realization that he could get stars from the art, music, and dance worlds to work for him inspired Étienne de Beaumont to become an impresario like Diaghilev. The following year Beaumont launched his short-lived Soirées de Paris theatre company and produced several original ballets, the most important of which was the Picasso-Satie-Massine collaboration Mercure (1924).
