= André Salomon =

French pianist (1881–1944)

André Salomon (27 October 1881 – 5 June 1944) was a French classical pianist.

== Biography ==
Born in the 11th arrondissement of Paris, where his father Alexis has a jewellery workshop, Salomon entered the Conservatoire de Paris in 1894. In Charles-Wilfrid de Bériot's piano class, his friends were Maurice Ravel, Ricardo Viñes and Ferdinand Motte-Lacroix. He began his career as soon as 1900. A soloist of the Pasdeloup and Lamoureux concerts, he used to perform with the singer Jane Bathori, the cellists Gérard Hekking, Maurice Maréchal, Pierre Fournier, the composer Léon Moreau, the flautist Philippe Gaubert, and the violist Pierre Villain. Accompanying the Kamensky and Carembat Quartets, he formed a trio with Louis Carembat (violin) and René Chizalet (cello).

On 10 June 1913, at the Théâtre des Champs-Élysées, he took part in the eighth season of Sergei Diaghilev's Ballets russes and held the piano part for Stravinsky's revival of Petrushka, premiered two years earlier by the same troupe: Tamara Karsavina, Vaslav Nijinsky, choreography by Michel Fokine, under the direction of Pierre Monteux.

Salomon premiered Erik Satie' Morceaux en forme de poire on 2 April 1919 at Count Étienne de Beaumont's. On 14 February 1920, he gave the first public performance of Socrate at the Salle du Conservatoire. Dedicatee of Erik Satie's 2nd Nocturne for piano, he was also the first performer, alongside the composer, of the Trois petites pièces montées (19 December 1920).

Co-founder, with the composer Amable Massis (second violin of the Carembat Quartet), of the Conservatoire de Musique de Troyes where he taught piano, he was forced to cease his functions under the Occupation, finding refuge in Aix-en-Provence. Arrested, interned at Drancy internment camp on 21 May 1944 under the matricule number 22 785, he was deported to Auschwitz by convoy No. 75 of 30 May 1944. A cenotaph was erected in his name at the Jewish cemetery in Aix-en-Provence.
