= Trois Mélodies (Satie) =

1916 song cycle by Erik Satie

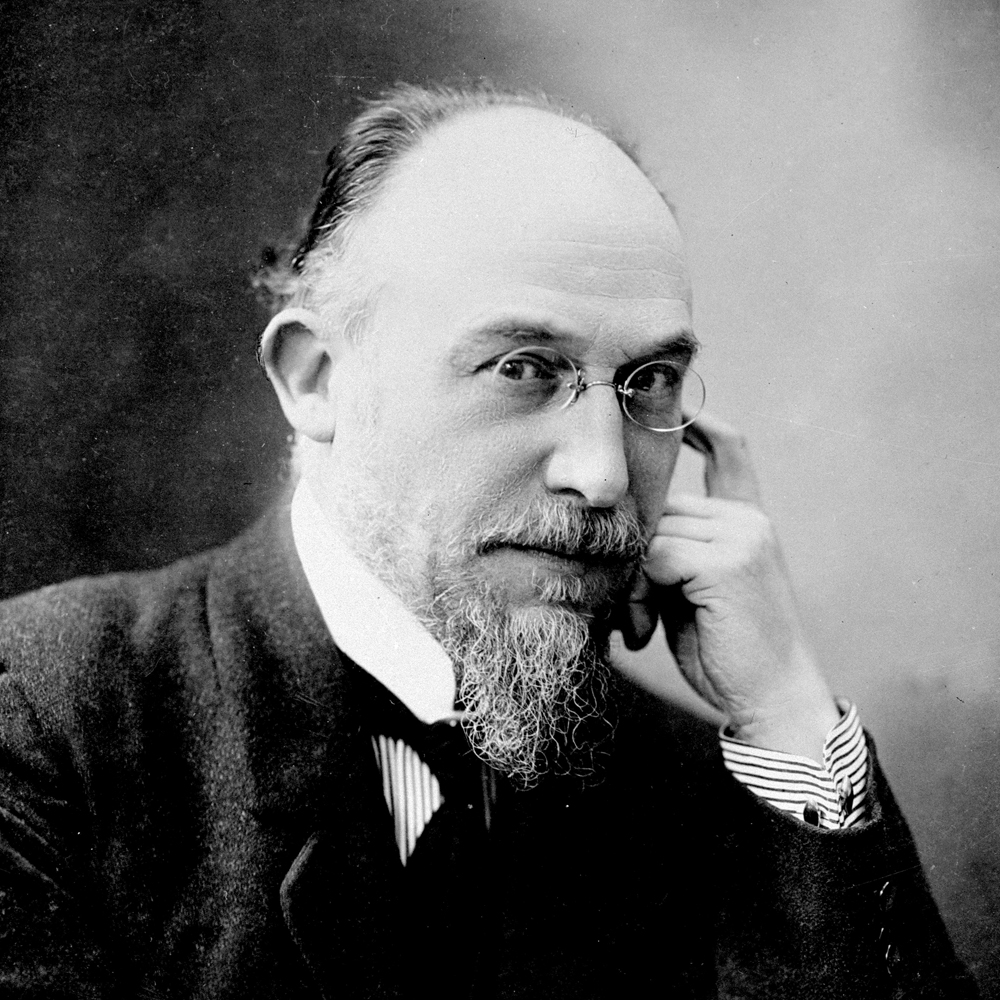
Erik Satie

Trois Mélodies (Three Songs or Melodies) is a 1916 song cycle for voice and piano by Erik Satie. One of Satie's rare excursions in mélodies (French art songs), it lasts under four minutes in performance.

The composer's first English-language biographer, Rollo H. Myers, thought this work contained "the essence of Satie the ironist, the wit, and the skillful parodist".

== Songs ==
The cycle consists of three songs set to whimsical verses by three contemporary French authors. Apart from a general light-hearted tone, there are no unifying elements in the music or texts. Satie conceived it for mezzo-soprano voice but it has been successfully performed by soprano and baritone vocalists.

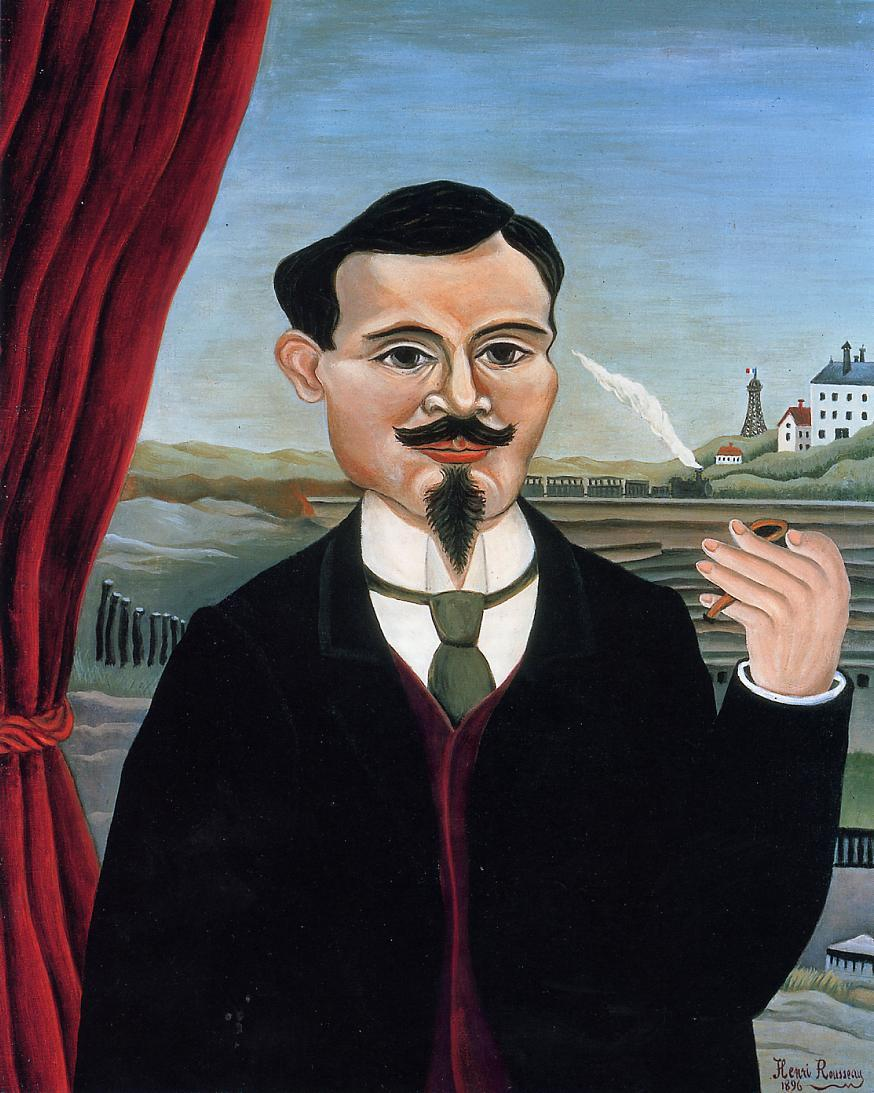
Léon-Paul Fargue

1. "La Statue de bronze" (The Bronze Statue). Poem by Léon-Paul Fargue. Dedicated to Jane Bathori.
  – Pas trop vite (not too fast)
  During the World War I years Satie found a friend and kindred spirit in avant-garde author Léon-Paul Fargue, whose absurdist, virtually untranslatable poetry cannot be linked to any school. They would later collaborate on Satie's mélodie cycle Ludions (1923). Fargue's lyrics for La Statue de bronze describe the ennui of an ornamental garden sculpture, a metallic frog, as passersby toss coins and other objects into its gaping mouth. There is a strong whiff of music hall in the cakewalk-like introduction, after which the piano part subsides into an oom-pah ostinato rhythm. Over this the initially ebullient vocal line fades into quiet pensiveness, as the artificial frog muses that it would rather be with real frogs in a pond "blowing bubbles of music out of the moonlight's soap", and how at night its mouth is full of insects it cannot eat.
2. "Daphénéo". Poem by M. God. Dedicated to Émile Engel.
  – Tranquille (quietly)
  "M. God" was a pseudonym for Marie Anne "Mimi" Godebska (1899–1949), the 17 year-old niece of Misia Sert, Satie's foremost patron of the period. Along with her younger brother Jean she was a dedicatee of Maurice Ravel's piano duet Ma mère l'Oye (1910). Godebska's poem is a silly dialogue about trees between two faux-mythical characters, Daphénéo and Chrysaline. AllMusic reviewer Virginia Sublett noted that the song "depends for its intelligibility on an untranslatable pun: eliding a final "n" turns un oisetier (a nonexistent word meaning "bird-tree") into un noisetier, or "hazel-nut tree". Satie's solemn, gently swaying underscoring gives the text an ironic dignity. Myers enthused, "The effect is irresistibly comic, although the means employed by Satie in turning this bit of nonsense into music are classic in their sobriety and restraint".

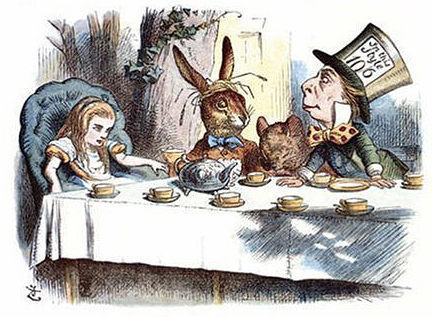
The Mad Hatter's tea party, illustration by Sir John Tenniel

1. "Le Chapelier" (The Hatter). Poem by René Chalupt after Lewis Carroll. Dedicated to Igor Stravinsky.
  – Allegretto (genre Gounod) (fairly brisk, in the manner of Gounod)
  Satie was a great fan of imaginative and humorous literature, and was very fond of Lewis Carroll's Alice's Adventures in Wonderland (1865). He once planned to write a ballet on the subject. (Note: Satie proposed the ballet Alice au Pays de Merveilles in June 1921. American translator Louise Norton and French author Henri-Pierre Roché worked on the scenario throughout the summer without success, and the project was abandoned.) This song cleverly employs multiple levels of literary and musical pastiche. Poet-journalist René Chalupt (1885–1957) drew his lyrics from Chapter 7 of Alice, "A Mad Tea-Party", focusing on The Mad Hatter. The character frets over his pocket watch, which is running "three days late" even though he lubricates it with "the best butter" and dunks it into his tea. Satie's accompaniment parodies the love duet Chanson de Magali from Gounod's opera Mireille (1864), which itself was an adaptation of an old Provençal folksong. Robert Orledge suggested that the playing direction "genre Gounod" was the composer's discreet way of thumbing his nose (musically speaking) at Gounod, "that epitome of bourgeois sentimentality".
  Satie was so pleased with "Le chapelier" that he dedicated it to his friend Igor Stravinsky, one of the few contemporary composers he admired without reservation.

The drollery of the Trois Mélodies would appear to link it with Satie's humoristic or "fantaisiste" compositions of the 1910s. But in this song cycle, apart from the "genre Gounod" reference, he refrained from using the witty playing directions and extramusical commentary that helped define the public perception of his music in the pre-World War I era. He had apparently grown weary of the formula. (Note: For example, Satie's song cycle Trois Poèmes d'amour (composed in 1914) was conceived in his vintage humoristic spirit, but upon its delayed publication in 1916 he chose to remove all the extramusical jokes and verbiage.) Satie would revert to it only once more, for his spoof of 18th-century piano music, the Sonatine bureaucratique (1917).

== History ==
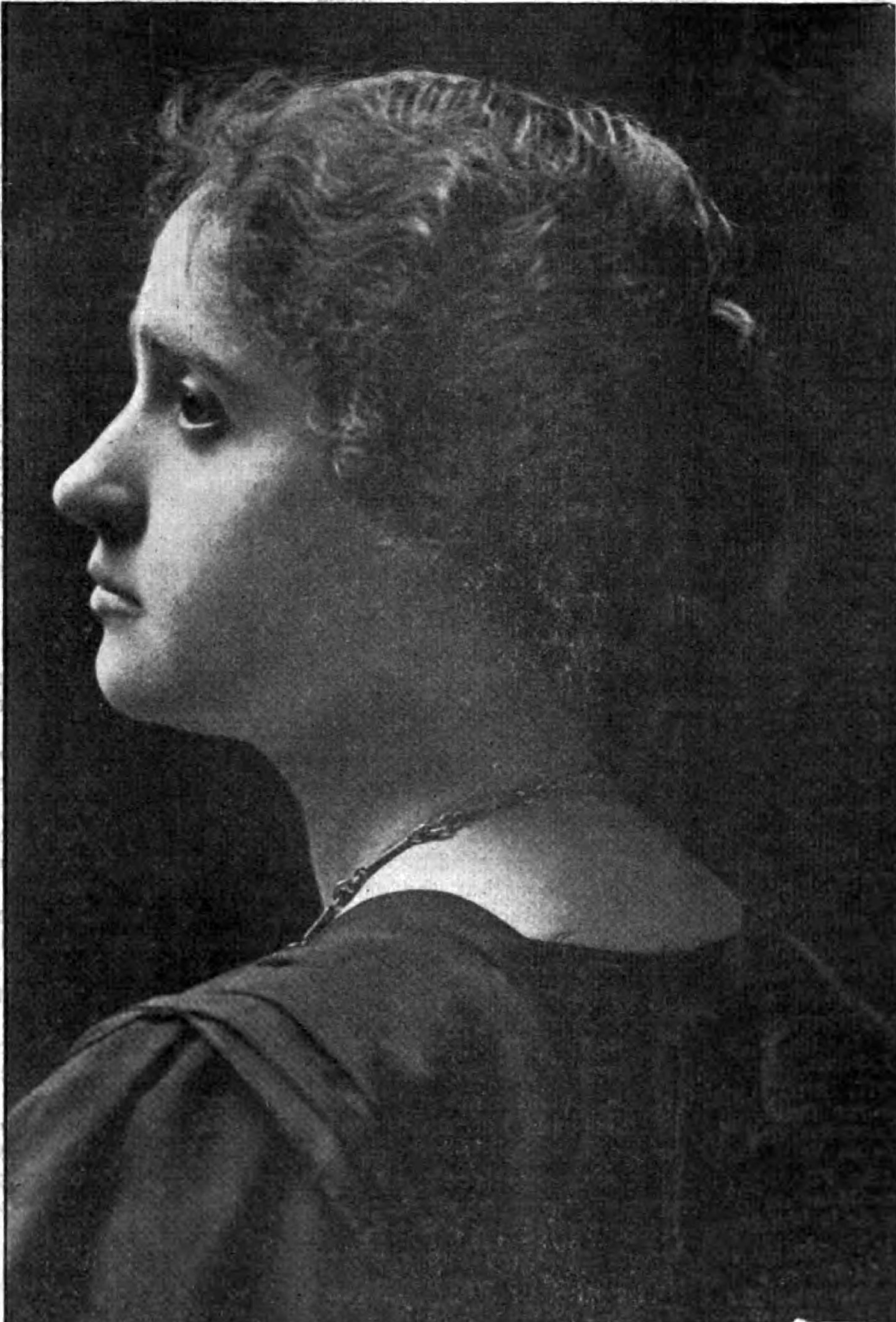
Jane Bathori

Satie wrote the Trois Mélodies for mezzo-soprano Jane Bathori, a star of the Parisian opera world and a vigorous promoter of new French music. Although Bathori knew of Satie's reputation through their mutual friend Claude Debussy, the two did not actually meet until early April 1916, in preparation for an upcoming Ravel-Satie Festival sponsored by the Société Lyre et Palette. Satie immediately agreed to provide two new vocal numbers for her, and the songs "Daphénéo" and "Le Chapelier" were completed by April 14. They were first performed by Bathori and pianist Ricardo Viñes at the festival, held at the Salle Huyghens in Paris on April 18, 1916.

Bathori was then invited to perform the two songs at a more prestigious event, a benefit concert "for artists affected by the War" sponsored by Germaine Bongard, sister of fashion designer Paul Poiret, scheduled for the following month. It would be staged in conjunction with an exhibition of modern painting, and Henri Matisse and Pablo Picasso were commissioned to design the programme. Satie habitually preferred to construct his compositions in groups of three, and on May 16 he sent Léon-Paul Fargue a note requesting a bit of verse to cap the Bathori cycle – "something very short & terribly cynical". Fargue's brand-new poem, "La Statue de bronze", was duly delivered and Satie completed his setting on May 26. The complete Trois Mélodies was premiered by Bathori and Satie at the Galerie Thomas in Paris on May 30, 1916. The score was published by Rouart-Lerolle et Cie in 1917.

In his last years, the irascible Satie severed ties with two collaborators on the Trois Mélodies, René Chalupt and Léon-Paul Fargue, over petty misunderstandings. But Jane Bathori continued to promote his music after the composer's death in 1925. With Satie disciple Darius Milhaud as her accompanist she made the first recording of the Trois Mélodies, issued by Columbia in 1929.

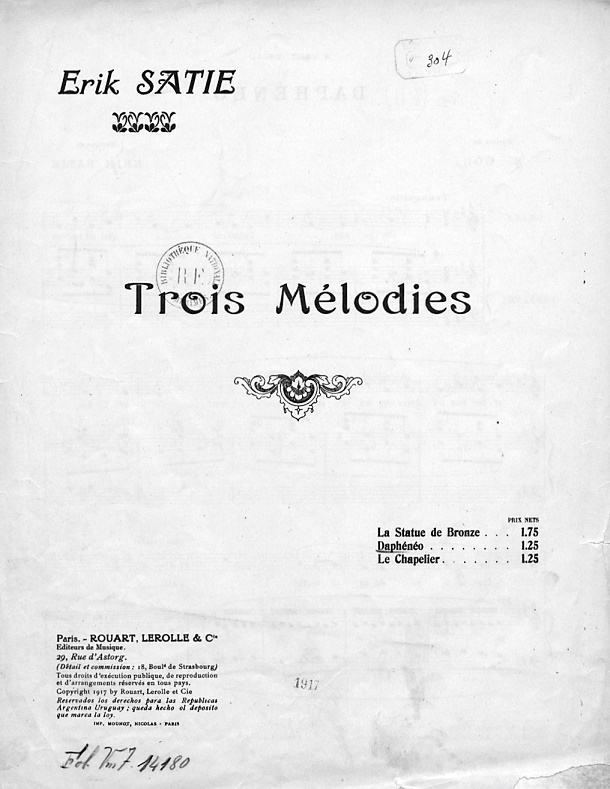
Trois Mélodies, first edition cover (1917)

== Discography ==
- Jane Bathori and Darius Milhaud (Columbia, 1929)
- Pierre Bernac and Francis Poulenc (Columbia Masterworks, 1952)
- Elaine Bonazzi and Frank Glazer (Vox, 1971)
- Mady Mesplé and Aldo Ciccolini (2 songs only, excluding La Statue de bronze, Arabesque, 1974)
- Marjanne Kweksilber and Reinbert de Leeuw (Harlekijn, 1976, reissued by Philips, 1982)
- Jessye Norman and Dalton Baldwin (Philips, 1977)
- Bruno Laplante and Marc Durand (Calliope, 1985)
- Eileen Hulse and Robin Bowman (Factory Classical, 1990)
- Sigune Von Osten and Armin Fuchs (ITM Classics, 1994)
- Jane Manning and Bojan Gorišek (Audiophile Classics, 2002)

== Notes and references ==
=== References ===
Sources

- Orledge, Robert (1990). Satie the Composer. Cambridge University Press. ISBN 9780521350372.
- Myers, Rollo H. (1968) [1948, Denis Dobson, London]. Erik Satie. New York: Dover Publications. ISBN 978-0486219035. OCLC 170903.
