= Pièces froides =

Sets of piano pieces by Erik Satie

The Pièces froides (Cold Pieces) are two sets of piano pieces composed in March 1897 by Erik Satie. Unpublished until 1912, they marked Satie's break from the mystical-religious music of his "Rosicrucian" period (1891–95), and were a harbinger of his humoristic piano suites of the 1910s.

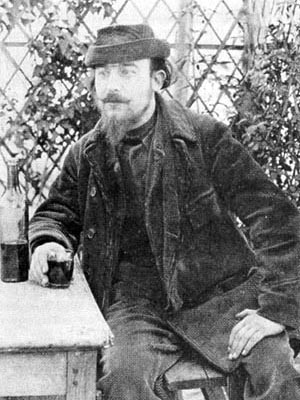
Erik Satie in his "Velvet Gentleman" garb of the late 1890s

Biographer Rollo Myers placed the Pièces froides high among Satie's piano works, writing, "Only a born musician of the finest sensibility could have conceived these limpid and so essentially 'musical' pieces which ought to be in the repertory of every pianist who is more interested in music than virtuosity."

A third set of Pièces froides, written in 1907 but shelved by the composer, was published posthumously.

== Background ==
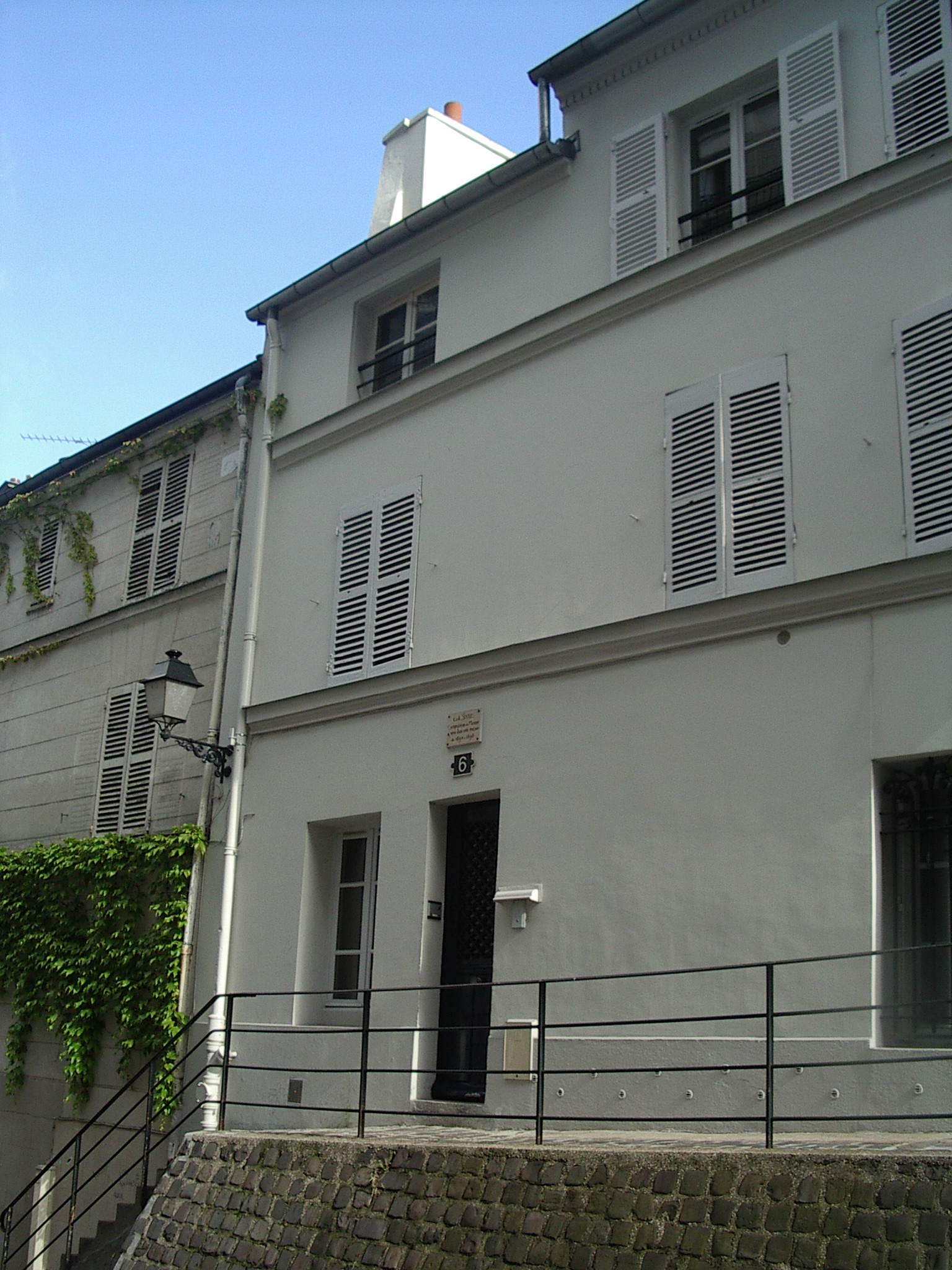
6 Rue Cortot in Montmartre, Paris, where Satie lived from 1890 to 1898.

The title Pièces froides—which can also be translated as Cold Rooms or Cold Cuts —has been viewed as a punning allusion to the dire poverty Satie experienced during his last years living in Montmartre. In July 1896, he had been forced to move from his room at 6 Rue Cortot into an unheated ground floor closet (he called it a "cupboard") in the same building, which the landlord offered him for 20 francs per quarter. The space was so small that Satie's camp bed all but blocked the door shut, and on frigid nights he kept warm by sleeping fully dressed with the rest of his clothing piled on top of him. These conditions were hardly conducive to composing, but one prospect gave him hope over the bitter 1896–97 winter.

Satie's friend Claude Debussy had long lobbied the Société Nationale de Musique (SNM) to perform his music, even though the group's director Ernest Chausson reportedly "almost fainted" after looking through some of the scores. In 1896 Debussy took matters into his own hands by orchestrating the first and third of Satie's Gymnopédies, and persuaded the Société to program them. Gustave Doret conducted the premiere at the Salle Érard in Paris on February 20, 1897. The critics (led by Satie's arch-enemy Willy) were hostile, but the pieces were warmly received by the audience. This event stirred Satie, who had composed almost nothing since 1895, into a renewed (if short-lived) burst of creativity. Within a month, he had completed the Pièces froides.

Having observed how Debussy arranged his music, Satie attempted to orchestrate two numbers from this set—the first of the Airs à faire fuir and the second of the Danses de travers—for the SNM. On March 22, he joked to his friend Louis Lemonnier, "I am going to play you these symphonic pieces on the tormented slide-trombone and make you block up your ears." But after 19 trials, he got no further than nine bars and abandoned the project. In the end, the Société remained uninterested in his work, and Satie lapsed into another creative silence that lasted until after his move to the distant Parisian suburb of Arcueil in October 1898.

== Original Pièces froides ==
The Pièces froides has two sets of three pieces, written in barless notation without key or time signatures. A complete performance lasts around 15 minutes.

1. Airs à faire fuir (Tunes to Make You Run Away)
  1. D'une manière très particulière (In a very unusual manner)
  2. Modestement (Simply)
  3. S'inviter (Invitingly)
2. Danses de travers (Crooked Dances)
  1. En y regardant à deux fois (Give it a good look)
  2. Passer (Go on)
  3. Encore (Again)

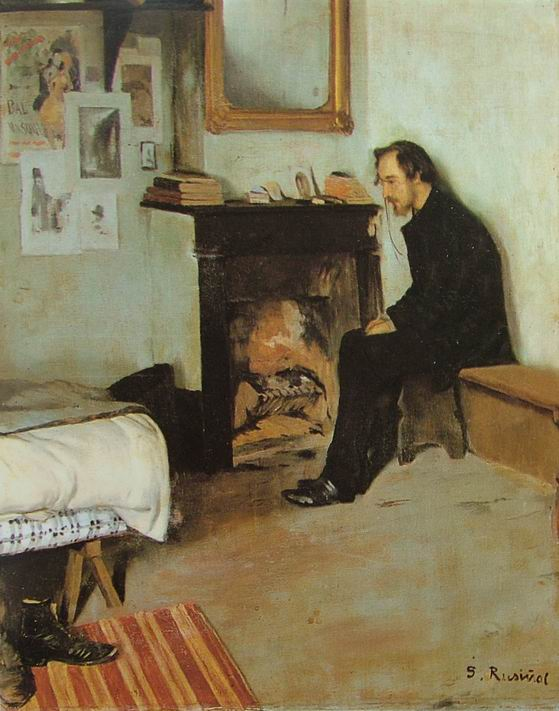
Satie in his first room at 6 Rue Cortot. Circa 1891 painting by Santiago Rusiñol

These airs and dances are a return to the graceful simplicity of Satie's Gymnopédies and Gnossiennes. They share with those early works clear textures and a tendency to present a single musical idea from a number of different perspectives, but have greater rhythmic fluidity and technical assurance. The spare melodic lines of the Danses de travers rest on arpeggiated left-hand accompaniments that are virtually unique in his output.

In terms of Satie's creative evolution, the real breakthrough occurs in the Modestemente, the second of the Airs à faire fuir. It is an ingenious reworking of the 18th century Northumbrian folk tune The Keel Row, retaining the rhythmic pattern while changing the pitches. This was a foretaste of the parodic borrowing that would become a key feature of Satie's later music, not only in the piano suites of the 1910s but in his ballets Parade (1917) and Relâche (1924), and in his final score, for the film Entr'acte (1924). Roger Shattuck, writing in 1955, recognized the importance of this unassuming parody: "For the first time Satie sounds not medieval or Greek or Javanese but Parisian. He sounds like himself."

Another new element in the Pièces froides is the ironic, self-effacing humor that now began to creep into Satie's extramusical texts, which at the time reflected his feelings of destitute isolation. One could hardly call the warm, inviting Airs "Tunes to Make You Run Away", and some of the playing directions hint at hunger and deprivation: "Don't eat too much" (used twice), "Rock bottom", "Suck on it", and "Medium done".

As Steven Moore Whiting observed, the "stylistic initiatives manifest in the Pièces froides" bore no immediate fruit. Satie was in the grip of a long creative crisis in which he was unsure how to progress as a serious composer. The stark experimental vein of his Rose + Croix compositions had petered out after the Messe des pauvres (1895), and later he contemptuously dismissed it as "music on its knees". But he must also have recognized that drawing on his Gnossiennes style for inspiration was a retrograde move. He would spend most of the years up to 1911 writing cabaret music (some of it of very high quality) and in belated studies at the Schola Cantorum in Paris. The Pièces froides and the subsequent Jack in the Box (1899), the Trois morceaux en forme de poire (1903), and the finest of his popular songs (Je te veux, La Diva de l'Empire) stand as isolated achievements during that fallow period.

== Nouvelles pièces froides ==
Satie composed the three Nouvelles pièces froides in the spring of 1907, while he was enrolled at the Schola Cantorum. They last roughly 6 minutes in performance.

1. Sur un mur (On a Wall)
2. Sur un arbre (In a Tree)
3. Sur un pont (On a Bridge)

The first two pieces, which were completed by April 22, are contrapuntal settings of the same popular-sounding melody that also show Satie – perhaps with tongue-in-cheek – experimenting with the harmonic styles of Debussy and Gabriel Faure." He showed them to an acquaintance of long standing, the younger composer Florent Schmitt. The feedback he received may not have been entirely positive, for he then wrote the concluding Sur un pont in a more austere, personal manner. Robert Orledge opined that the Nouvelles pièces froides were an inconclusive offshoot of Satie's Schola studies and that he was "wise not to publish them during his lifetime."

Incidentally, the second piece (Sur un arbre) bore the working title Suite pour un chien ("Suite for a Dog"), a theme Satie would more profitably explore in the first of his humoristic piano suites, the Veritables Preludes flasques (pour un chien) (1912).

== Publication ==
The first edition (1912) of the original Pièces froides was published by Rouart, Lerolle & Cie, which brought out a number of Satie's old compositions following his 1911 "discovery" by Maurice Ravel. Satie revised the humorous playing instructions but left the music virtually intact. The Airs à faire fuir were dedicated to pianist Ricardo Viñes and the Danses de travers to the wife of music critic Jules Écorcheville, author of the first important critical survey of Satie.

The Nouvelles pièces froides were published by Salabert in 1968.

== Recordings ==
Aldo Ciccolini (EMI, 1971, 1988), Jean-Joël Barbier (Universal Classics France, 1971), Jacques Février (excerpts, Everest, 1975, reissued by Essential Media in 2011), Reinbert de Leeuw (Harlekijn, 1975, reissued by Philips, 1980), Yūji Takahashi (Denon, 1976), France Clidat (Forlane, 1984), Jean-Pierre Armengaud (Le Chant Du Monde, 1986), Anne Queffélec (Virgin Classics, 1988), Pascal Rogé (London, 1996), Michel Legrand (Erato, 1993), Olof Höjer (Swedish Society Discofil, 1996), Jean-Yves Thibaudet (Decca, 2002), and Alexandre Tharaud (Harmonia Mundi, 2009), Alessandro Simonetto (OnClassical, 2016, 2021)
