= Trois Morceaux en forme de poire =

1903 suite by Erik Satie

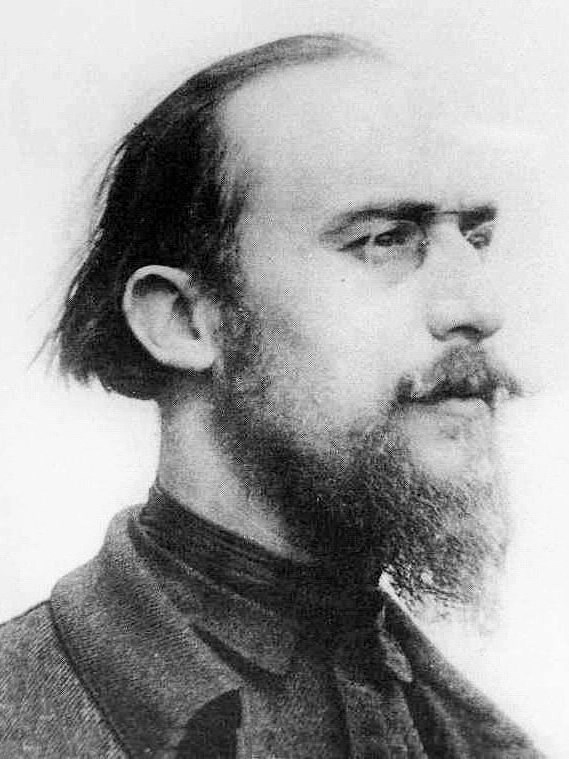
Erik Satie

Trois Morceaux en forme de poire (Three Pieces in the Shape of a Pear) is a 1903 suite for piano four hands by French composer Erik Satie. A lyrical compendium of his early music, it is one of Satie's most famous compositions, second in popular recognition only to the Gymnopédies (1888). The score was not published until 1911. In performance it lasts around 14 minutes.

It is typical of Satie's eccentric humor that the suite consists of seven pieces, not three.

== Background ==
Satie composed the Trois Morceaux en forme de poire in Paris between August and November 1903, during a period of creative crisis. He was unhappy earning a meager living writing and performing cabaret music, and had abandoned his recent "serious" musical projects - the piano piece Le Poisson rêveur (1901) and the orchestral tone poem Le Bœuf Angora (c. 1901) - as failures. And the shock of hearing his friend Claude Debussy's landmark opera Pelléas et Mélisande (1902) led him to realize that experimenting with musical Impressionism was a dead end: "Nothing more can be done in this direction; I must search for something else or I am lost."

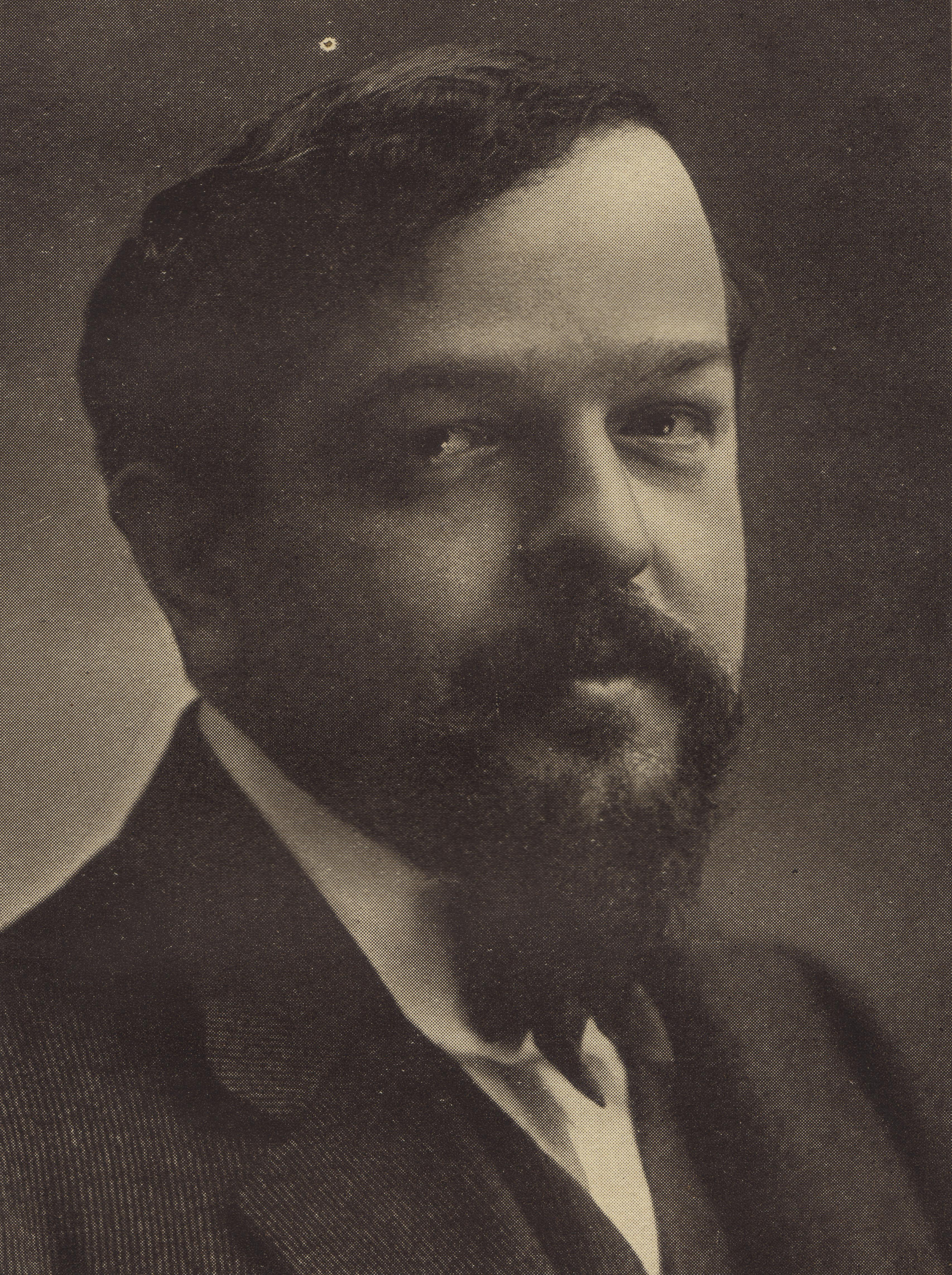
Claude Debussy

Legend has it the Trois morceaux was Satie's tongue-in-cheek response to Debussy's advice that he should "pay more attention to form" in his music. Conductor Vladimir Golschmann recalled Satie telling him that "All I did...was to write Pieces in the Form of a Pear. I brought them to Debussy, who asked, 'Why such a title?' Why? Simply, my dear friend, because you cannot criticize my Pieces in the shape of a pear. If they are en forme de poire they cannot be shapeless." However the probity of this anecdote has been disputed in light of a letter Satie wrote to Debussy on August 17, 1903, when the suite was still in its early stages:

"I am working at the present time on a delightful work entitled Deux morceaux en forme de poire. Monsieur Erik Satie is crazy about this new invention of his mind. He talks about it a lot and says very good things about it. He believes it superior to everything he has written up to now; perhaps he's wrong, but we musn't tell him so: he wouldn't believe it."

These original two pieces were probably Morceaux I and II, and the work expanded outwards from there. Morceaux I is the only piece in the set consisting entirely of new music; the rest were largely recycled from older material. To the core group of Morceaux I-III Satie added two introductory and two concluding pieces, with headings that spoofed academic teaching of the kind he loathed during his studies at the Paris Conservatoire in the 1880s.

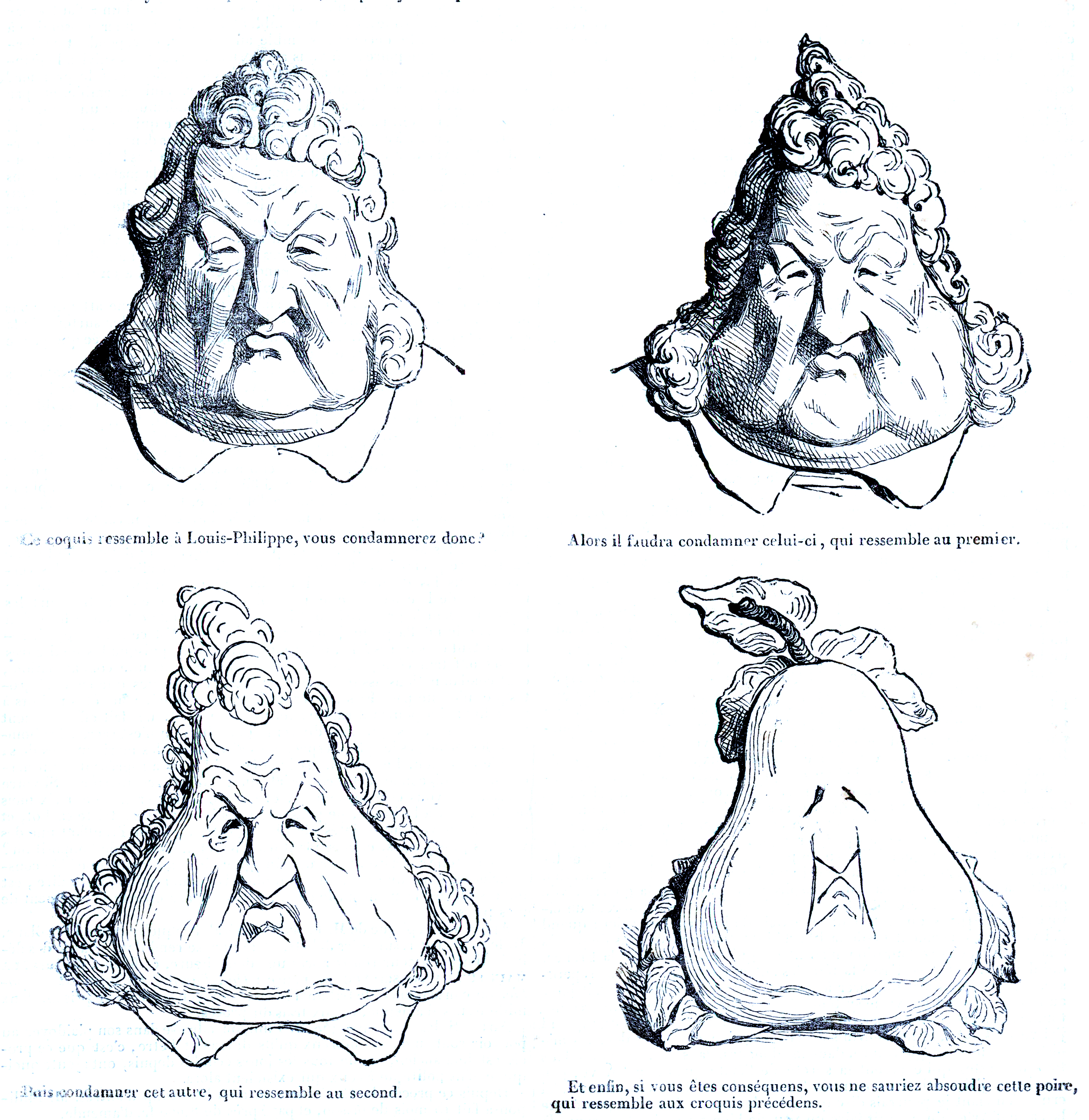
Honoré Daumier's 1831 caricature of King Louis Philippe's head turning into a pear

The title Trois Morceaux en forme de poire prefigures those of Satie's humoristic piano suites of the 1910s and reflects his fondness for puns and ironic ambiguity. The word "poire" was time-honored French slang for "head", meaning "fool" or "simpleton". In the 1830s caricaturist Honoré Daumier satirically defined the reign of French King Louis Philippe by drawing the monarch with a pear-shaped head, and the insult became entrenched in the popular lexicon. This subversive meaning is frequently cited by Satie biographers and researchers, with differing opinions over whether the composer intended it to mock Debussy, himself, or both. "Poire" was also a nickname for a child's spinning top, and the oscillating, repetitive material of the outer pieces of the Trois morceaux has been likened to the toy's movement.

The suite was Satie's first composition for piano four hands, a genre he would subsequently enrich with original works (Aperçus désagréables, En habit de cheval) and arrangements (Parade, La Belle Excentrique). Keyboard duets were a popular form of home music-making in the years before World War I, but as Satie made no immediate attempt to publish the Trois morceaux it is possible he chose this form simply because it provided him and Debussy with an opportunity to play together. What Debussy thought of the work is not known, though he retained enough interest to help Satie correct the proofs for its initial publication eight years later.

In a bizarre, self-aggrandizing text scribbled on the verso of the manuscript, Satie heralded the Trois Morceaux as "a prestigious turning point in the History of My Life." But beneath the braggadocio and jesting over matters of form was Satie's growing sense that his technique was inadequate, and hindering his progress as a composer. Robert Orledge noted that the sheer amount of self-borrowing in the Trois Morceaux was "not a healthy sign" for a musician dedicated to looking towards the future. Satie later admitted to his brother Conrad that he grew "tired of being reproached with an ignorance of which I thought I must be guilty, since competent people pointed it out in my works." The Trois Morceaux en forme de poire would be his last important composition for nearly a decade. In 1905 Satie began seven years of study at the Schola Cantorum in Paris, where he would acquire the technical assurance to pursue his mature style.

== Music ==
The Trois Morceaux is an unorthodox retrospective of Satie's early creative evolution. Dispensing with a chronological scheme, Satie variously dips into the music of his youthful Chat Noir days, his "Rosicrucian" phase, and his gradual (if seemingly reluctant) embrace of popular influences, culminating in his "café-concert" style of the early 1900s. Although the prevailing tone is that of melancholy, the work is tuneful, often lively, and (apart from some occasional disruptive chords) easy to listen to.

These are seven separate pieces, musically unrelated to each other but given a semblance of formal cohesion by Satie's less-than-serious headings. Steven Moore Whiting noted that "The core pieces of the morceaux each present a distinctive synthesis of Satie's various styles", while the framing numbers are straightforward presentations of earlier material with little alteration of the originals. Nothing about the music suggests a relationship to the pear of the title.

The pieces and their provenance are as follows:

1. Manière de commencement (A Way of Beginning) – Allez modérément (moderately)
  An unpublished Gnossienne originally written as part of Satie's incidental music for Joséphin Péladan's play Le Fils des étoiles (1892)
2. Prolongation du même (More of the Same) – Au pas (walking pace)
  A march based on Satie's unfinished cabaret song Le Roi soleil de plomb (c. 1900)
3. Morceau 1 (Piece I) – Lentement (slowly)
  The only newly composed whole piece in the set, it recalls the structural procedures of Satie's "esoteric" music of the early 1890s (e.g., the Prélude de la porte héroïque du ciel) but is harmonically closer to the parody songs he wrote for entertainer Vincent Hyspa at the turn of the 20th century
4. Morceau 2 (Piece II) – Enlevé (detached)
  An ebullient march and trio based on two of Satie's cabaret songs, Impérial-Napoléon (1901) and Le Veuf (1899)
5. Morceau 3 (Piece III) – Brutal (brutally)
  An ABA structure. Whiting called the jarring, newly composed 21-bar introduction "possibly the most forward-looking music in the whole work." In the central section Satie evokes the style of his Pièces froides (1897), incorporating 25 bars of a rejected draft for the second of the Danses de travers
6. En plus (What's More) – Calme (calmly)
  A literal transcription of Satie's Danse for chamber ensemble (1890), his earliest known attempt at orchestral composition
7. Redite (Rehash) – Dans le lent (slowly)
  Uses material from the abandoned music for Le Bœuf Angora (c. 1901) and alludes to the popular slow waltzes Satie was writing at the time (e.g., Je te veux).

== Publication and performance ==
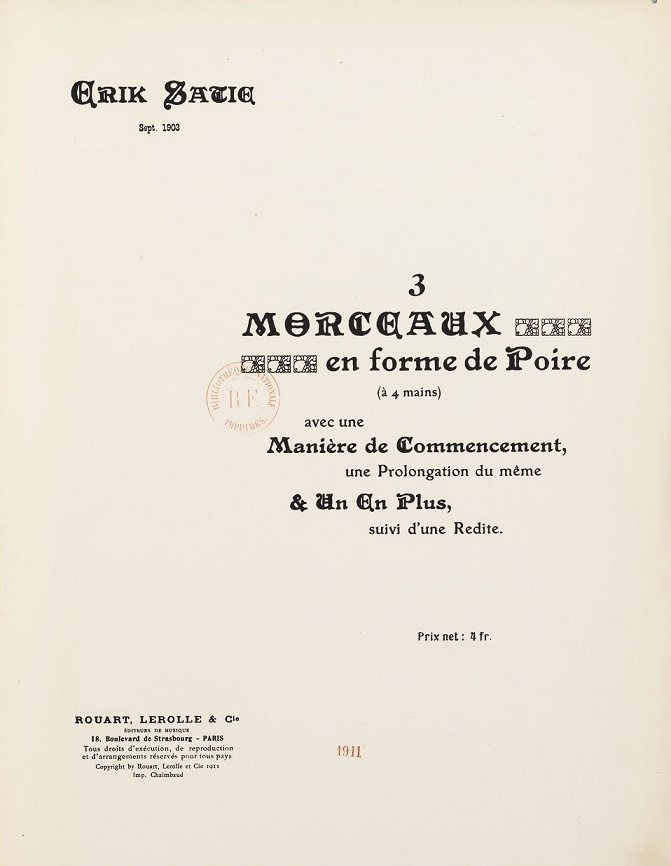
Cover for the original edition of Satie's Trois Morceaux en forme de poire (1911)

The Trois Morceaux was first published by Rouart, Lerolle & Cie, which brought out several of Satie's old compositions in the wake of his much-publicized 1911 "discovery" by Maurice Ravel. From there it served as a "musical calling card" for Satie's entry into Parisian high society through performances at fashionable salons or private events. The earliest documented performance was given by Ravel and Florent Schmitt at the studio of Valentine de Saint-Point on June 11, 1912. On January 19, 1914, 14-year-old musical prodigy Georges Auric (accompanied by Jean Moulenq) took on all of Satie's piano duet music at an exclusive gathering in Paris. Influential arts patron Misia Sert arranged to have Satie himself play the work for impresario Sergei Diaghilev at her home on June 28, 1914, with an eye towards gaining him a commission from Diaghilev's Ballets Russes. The occasion was disrupted by breaking news of the assassination of Franz Ferdinand in Sarajevo, the act that precipitated the start of World War I, and for the time being nothing came of the idea.

The most important of these invitation-only performances of the Trois Morceaux took place at the Salle Huyghens located in the 14th arrondissement of Paris on April 18, 1916, with Ricardo Viñes and the composer at the piano. It was the centerpiece of a "Satie-Ravel Festival" sponsored by the Société Lyre et Palette, which drew a prestigious crowd of artists, intellectuals and upper crust tastemakers. Alexis Roland-Manuel introduced the program with a lecture on Satie and his aesthetic, and some of his newer works were heard (the 1915 Avant-dernières Pensées and two songs from the Trois Mélodies of 1916, sung by Jane Bathori). But the "pear-shaped pieces" made the greatest impression on the audience, much to Satie's chagrin. He had grown sick of the morceaux by then and made his feelings clear in his thank-you note to Viñes the following day: "How very boring my old music is! What bullshit, I venture to say!"

Author Jean Cocteau, who attended the Salle Huyghens event, thought otherwise. He had long nursed the idea of an avant-garde ballet project with a fairground setting that he hoped would "astonish" Diaghilev, and decided that the Trois Morceaux, with its idiosyncratic use of popular song and dance idioms, was ideal for his purposes. He proposed a collaboration with Satie through an intermediary, their mutual friend artist Valentine Hugo. On April 25 Satie wrote to Hugo, "I hope the admirable Cocteau won't use any of my old works. Let's do something new, right? No joke." After meeting with Satie, Cocteau agreed to forgo the morceaux in favor of a brand new score. This was the origin of the landmark Satie-Picasso-Cocteau-Massine ballet Parade, produced by Diaghilev in 1917.

The Trois Morceaux became something of a warhorse for Satie and was one of his most frequently played works in Paris during his lifetime. He allowed choreographer Leonide Massine to patch together the morceaux and another of his piano duets, the Trois petites pièces montées (1920), into the ballet Premier Amour (1924) for the short-lived Soirées de Paris stage company at the Théâtre de la Cigale. It was a solo number starring Lydia Lopokova as a girl who dreams she falls in love with a doll. Satie and his favorite interpreter of the 1920s, Marcelle Meyer, played the piano during its handful of performances.

After Satie's death, his protégé composer-conductor Roger Désormière arranged the Trois Morceaux for orchestra and kept it in his concert repertoire for the rest of his career. On June 9, 1949, the duet version was broadcast in England on the BBC Third Programme during an all-Satie concert devised by Constant Lambert; the pianists were Mary and Geraldine Peppin. The first recording was by Satie disciple Francis Poulenc and Jacques Février for Musidisc in 1959.

In the 1990s, pianist-musicologist Olof Höjer (who recorded Satie's complete keyboard music) maintained that the Trois Morceaux was much better known by its title and reputation than by its presence in contemporary performance. Pear imagery has become part of Satie's iconography through its appearance on album covers of his music and in artwork and writings pertaining to the composer. For example, at Les Maisons Satie (Satie Birthplace and Museum) in Honfleur, France, one of the exhibits is a large animatronic statue of a winged pear.

== In popular culture ==
- Choreographer Merce Cunningham created his 1953 ballet Septet to the score of the Trois Morceaux.
- Artist Man Ray, a friend of Satie's in the 1920s, paid tribute to him with two colored lithographs entitled Erik Satie's Pear (1969).
- Excerpts from the Trois Morceaux were used in the soundtracks of the films Badlands (1973) and Hugo (2011).
- British actor Alistair McGowan wrote and starred in a play about Satie's life for BBC Radio 4, Three Pieces in the Shape of a Pear (2013).

== Recordings ==
For piano duet:

Aldo Ciccolini recorded it twice for EMI, overdubbing the second piano part himself in 1971 and paired with Gabriel Tacchino in 1988. Other notable recordings are by Robert and Gaby Casadesus (CBS, 1959), Georges Auric and Jacques Février (Disques Adès, 1968), Frank Glazer and Richard Deas (Candide, 1970), Jean Wiener and Jean-Joël Barbier (Universal Classics France, 1971, reissued 2002), Yūji Takahashi and Alain Planès (Denon, 1980), Wyneke Jordans and Leo van Doeselaar (Etcetera, 1983), Jean-Pierre Armengaud and Dominique Merlet (Mandala, 1990), Christian Ivaldi and Noël Lee (Arion, 1991), Anne Queffélec and Catherine Collard (Virgin Classics, 1993), Philippe Corre and Edoudard Exerjean (Disques Pierre Verany, 1993), Klára Körmendi and Gábor Eckhardt (Naxos, 1994), Duo Campion-Vachon (Fleurs de Lys, 1995), Olof Höjer and Max Lorstad (Swedish Society, 1996), Bojan Gorisek and Tatiana Ognjanovic (Audiophile Classics, 1999), Jean-Philippe Collard and Pascal Rogé (Decca, 2000), Katia and Marielle Labèque (KML, 2009), Sandra and Jeroen van Veen (Brilliant Classics, 2013).

For orchestra (arr. Désormière):

Maurice Abravanel, Utah Symphony (Vanguard, 1968).
