= Danse (Satie) =

Composition by Erik Satie

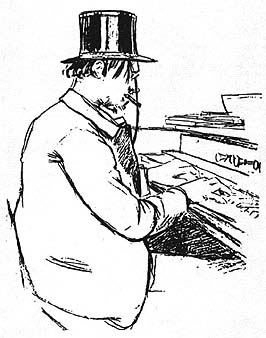
Erik Satie in the early 1890s

Danse is a short instrumental piece by Erik Satie. Completed on December 5, 1890, it is his earliest known attempt at orchestral composition. The original score has never been published or recorded, but Satie later transcribed it as the En plus movement of his famous keyboard suite Trois morceaux en forme de poire (1903). A performance would last about 2 minutes.

== Description ==
There was no course in orchestration at the Paris Conservatory while Satie was a student there (1879–1886), making the 54-bar Danse an experiment with what he had learned so far by ear – primarily at cabarets like Le Chat Noir, where he was then working as a pianist and occasional conductor. The scoring for 8 players (2 flutes, 1 oboe, 2 clarinets (B♭, A), 1 bassoon, timpani, and harp) is a novel take on the standard "brasserie"-type ensemble, with no strings or brass and key substitutions in the percussion for a softer, more varied sound. Woodwinds carry most of the melodic line while the harp part serves the practical function of continuo. Musically the piece has been described as a cross between the common time grace of a Gymnopédie and the modal ambiguity of a Gnossienne, and Satie may have given it the generic name "Dance" simply due to its more prominent rhythmic pattern.

For the 1903 piano four hands reduction of Danse as En plus, No. 6 of the Trois Morceux, the composer removed material for the B♭ clarinet and assigned the harp part to the Secondo keyboard part. In a weird text scribbled on the back of the En plus manuscript Satie proclaimed "I am at a prestigious turning point in the History of My life". He may have rescued the little Danse by finding a new guise for it in what became one of his most popular works, but otherwise his statement was premature. Since 1890 his attempts at writing for orchestra – arrangements of the Gnossienne No. 3 and two of the Pièces froides (1897), and the tone poem Le Bœuf Angora (The Angora Ox, 1901) – were all dashed by his technical limitations. It was only after enrolling at the Schola Cantorum in 1905 that Satie acquired the skills to pursue his more ambitious goals – including learning how to orchestrate properly.
