= Prélude de la porte héroïque du ciel =

1894 composition for piano by Erik Satie

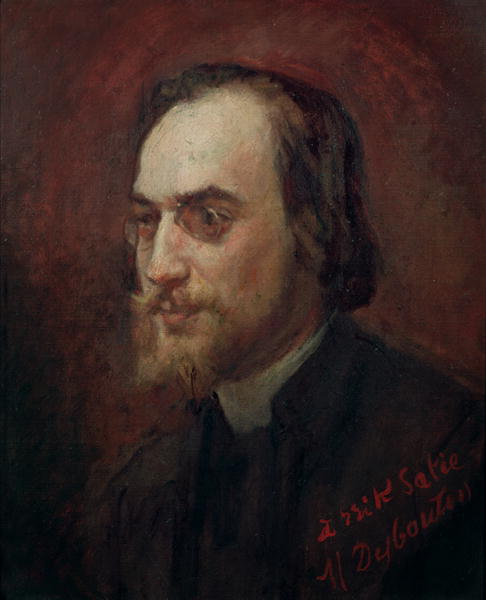
Erik Satie, portrait by Marcellin Desboutin (1893)

The Prélude de La Porte héroïque du ciel is an 1894 piano composition by Erik Satie, intended as a musical introduction to the play The Heroic Gate of Heaven by Jules Bois. It is considered one of the finest works of his "Rosicrucian" or "mystic" period. A typical performance lasts around 6 minutes. Satie was so fond of the piece he dedicated it to himself.

== Description ==
Satie's early pursuit of mystical preoccupations in his art did not end with his break from Joséphin Péladan's Rose + Croix movement in August 1892. For a time he and Claude Debussy were both drawn into the orbit of another Rose + Croix defector, Jules Bois, the occultist writer and publisher of the esoteric journal Le coeur. Bois' 1895 book Le satanisme et la magie (Satanism and Magic) and other "blasphemous" writings pegged him as a Satanist, but he delved into a wide range of ancient and modern religions and superstitions, as well as psychology. While Debussy declined an offer to write incidental music for Bois' play Les Noces de Sathan (1892), the little-known Satie found the association (and the publicity it brought) more congenial. It was in the October 1893 issue of Le coeur that Satie announced the founding of his one-man sect the Metropolitan Church of Art of Jesus the Conductor, and Bois continued to publish items by and about the composer until his journal folded in June 1895. La Porte héroïque du ciel would be their only creative collaboration.

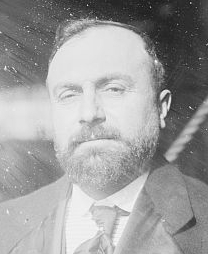
Jules Bois

The plot of Bois' one-act "esoteric drama" involves a poet who is sent on a mission by Christ to forcibly dethrone the Virgin Mary and replace her with the ancient Egyptian goddess Isis. Other characters include the Serpent from the Garden of Eden, the Biblical Miriam, "A Young Woman from the Orient", and background figures listed as "Whores" and "Larvae". Satie biographer Alan Gillmor described this decadent blend of Egyptology, the Bible, and 19th Century Fin de siècle Paris as "an ironic study of religious sentimentality."

As with Satie's other theatrical works of his mystic phase, the Prélude makes no attempt to illustrate the drama that proceeds it, favoring instead the "static sound décor" approach he had pioneered with his incidental music for Péladan's play Le Fils des étoiles (1892). It is an independent piece, skillfully constructed of 18 integrated short motifs and unified by a recurring cadential figure. The material itself is warmer and more engaging than was typical for Satie's religion-themed compositions, aided by playing directions which address the pianist's feelings rather than their technique ("Calm and profoundly sweet", "Superstitiously", "Very sincerely silent", "With timid piety", and "Without pride").

The text of La Porte héroïque du ciel, along with Satie's score and illustrations by Count Antoine de La Rochefoucauld, was published as a booklet by the Librairie de l'art independent in March 1894. Lugné-Poe directed its premiere at his Théâtre de l'Œuvre in Paris on May 29, 1894. Contemporary reviews ignored the music to focus on Bois' provocative play, and it is unclear if Satie's prelude was even performed. The production evidently did not foster good relations between the composer and the theatre director. Lugné-Poe soon became a favorite target of Satie's polemical writings under his guise as High priest of the Metropolitan Church of Art.

Apart from his ongoing (and probably unfinished) work on the Messe des pauvres, the Prélude was the only music Satie composed in 1894.

In the wake of Satie's 1911 "discovery" by the Société musicale indépendante (instigated by Maurice Ravel and others), and the sudden interest in his music, his new young protégé Alexis Roland-Manuel offered to orchestrate the Prélude de la porte héroïque du ciel. His version was premiered at an SMI concert at the Salle Gaveau in Paris on June 17, 1912. Satie did not attend, but he provided an ironic program note in which he described the piece as "a little prelude worked in ivory like a tapestry of sound, a little prelude full of mystical sweetness, a little prelude full of ecstatic joy, a little prelude full of intimate goodness." Rouart, Lerolle & Cie published the original piano score (with Satie's self-dedication) later that year.

== Recordings ==
Piano solo: Francis Poulenc (BAM, 1957, reissued 1976), Frank Glazer (Vox, 1970), Aldo Ciccolini (twice for EMI, 1971 and 1988), Jean-Joël Barbier (Universal Classics France, 1971), Reinbert de Leeuw (Harlekijn, 1975, reissued by Philips, 1980), Yūji Takahashi (Denon, 1976), France Clidat (Forlane, 1984), Anne Queffélec (Virgin Classics, 1988), Jean-Pierre Armengaud (Circé, 1990), Klára Koermendi (Naxos, 1993), Bojan Gorišek (Audiophile Classics, 1994), John White (Ars Nova, 1995), Pascal Rogé (London, 1996), Olof Höjer (Swedish Society Discofil, 1996), Jean-Yves Thibaudet (Decca, 2002), Steffen Schleiermacher (MGD, 2002), Cristina Ariagno (Brilliant Classics, 2006), Jeroen van Veen (Brilliant Classics, 2014).
