= Picasso and the Ballets Russes =

Pablo Picasso's involvement and collaborations with the Ballets Russes

Pablo Picasso, 1917, Harlequin (Arlequín), oil on canvas, 116 x 90 cm, Museo Picasso, Barcelona. The model for Harlequin was Léonide Massine. Picasso painted this work in Barcelona between June and November 1917, with the idea of presenting it at the Liceu Theatre, with the ballet Parade. It is the first work by Picasso to enter the museum collections of Barcelona (Donated by the artist, 1919).

Pablo Picasso and the Ballets Russes collaborated on several productions. Pablo Picasso's Cubist sets and costumes were used by Sergei Diaghilev in the Ballets Russes's Parade (1917, choreography: Léonide Massine), Le Tricorne (The Three-Cornered Hat) (1919, choreography: Massine), Pulcinella (1920, choreographer: Massine), and Cuadro Flamenco (1921, choreography: Spanish folk dancers). Picasso also drew a sketch with pen on paper of La Boutique fantasque (The Magic Toyshop), (1919, choreography: Massine) and designed the drop curtain for Le Train Bleu (1924, choreography: Bronislava Nijinska), based on his painting Two Women Running on the Beach (The Race), 1922.

The idea for the set design of Parade came from the decorations at a small vaudeville theater in Rome as well as the décor of the Teatro dei Piccoli, a marionette theater. The original model was crafted in a cardboard box. Picasso realized immediately that he liked using vivid colors for his sets and costumes because they registered so well with the audience. While the sets, costumes and music by Erik Satie were well received by critics, the ballet in general was panned when it first premiered and played for only two performances. When it was revived in 1920, however, Diaghilev said, "Parade is my best bottle of wine. I do not like to open it too often."

Costume design by Pablo Picasso for Serge Diaghilev's Ballets Russes performance of Parade at Théâtre du Châtelet in Paris, 18 May 1917

Costume design by Pablo Picasso representing skyscrapers and boulevards, for Serge Diaghilev's Ballets Russes performance of Parade at Théâtre du Châtelet, Paris 18 May 1917

The writer Jean Cocteau, who introduced Picasso to Diaghilev, wrote the scenario for Parade, and was Picasso's neighbor in Rome said, "Picasso amazes me every day, to live near him is a lesson in nobility and hard work ... A badly drawn figure of Picasso is the result of endless well-drawn figures he erases, corrects, covers over, and which serves him as a foundation. In opposition to all schools he seems to end his work with a sketch." Additionally, Guillaume Apollinaire, who wrote the program notes for Parade, described Picasso's designs as "a kind of surrealism" three years before Surrealism developed as an art movement in Paris.

Picasso's sets and costumes for the Ballets Russes are now considered symbols of "the progressive art of their time, and [they] have only become more celebrated and better appreciated over the past century." Nevertheless, according to his biographer, John Richardson, "Picasso's Cubist followers were horrified that their hero should desert them for the chic, elitist Ballets Russes." It was the onset of World War I that prompted him to leave Paris and live in Rome, where the Ballets Russes rehearsed. He also was recovering from two failed love affairs at this time. Soon after he arrived in Rome, however, he met ballerina Olga Khokhlova, and married her in 1918. He remained married to her until her death in 1955, although they separated by the late 1920s. He also became friends with Massine while in Rome; they were both interested in Spanish themes, women, and modern art.

Picasso also became friends with Igor Stravinsky during this time, though he found Diaghilev to be possessive and did not become close to him. Picasso was even quoted as saying that he "felt a desperate need to travel back to the land of human beings" after spending time with Diaghilev. Diaghilev, however, valued Picasso's work, and the drop curtain he created for Le Train Bleu – the painting of which was completed not by Picasso, but by Prince Alexander Schervashidze – was deemed so impressive that Diaghilev used it as the logo for the Ballets Russes.

== Other theater work ==
In 1924, Picasso designed the sets and costumes for Massine's Mercure, which was produced not by Diaghilev, but by Comte Étienne de Beaumont with music by Satie. Picasso did not design for the theater again until 1946, when he did the curtain design for Roland Petit's Le Rendez-vous at the Ballets des Champs-Élysées.

Picasso's painting Olga in the Armchair (1918)

Picasso's costume design for Le Tricorne (1919–1920)

Picasso's costume design for Pulcinella (1920)

Scene from La Boutique Fantastique drawn by Picasso (1919)
