= Yvonne George =

Belgian singer and actress (1896–1930)

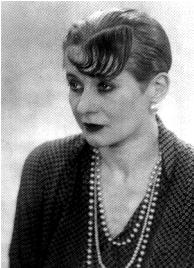
Yvonne George, 1928

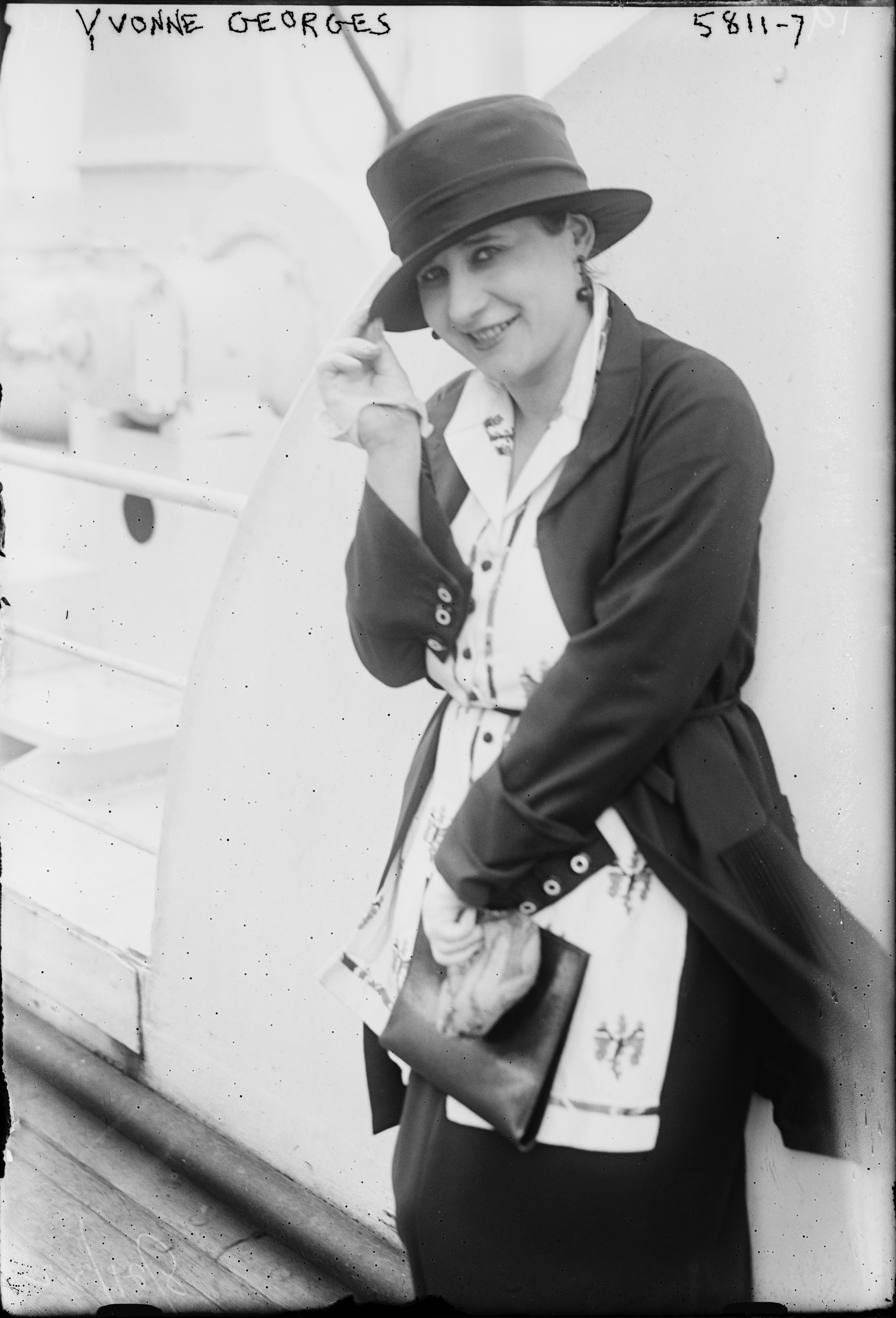
George c. 1922

Yvonne de Knops (1896 in Brussels – 1930 in Genoa), better known by her stage name Yvonne George, was a Belgian singer, feminist and actress.

== Biography ==
George started her artistic career on the stage, where she befriended Jean Cocteau, but gravitated especially toward a repertoire of old songs with realist themes.

Paul Franck, director of the Paris Olympia, discovered George in the 1920s in a Brussels cabaret. George debuted at the Olympia in 1922, singer her famous Nous irons à Valparaiso (We will go to Valparaiso) and Good bye Farewell. A certain high-minded section of the public did not appreciate the refrain of this song; George already achieved a polemical success, criticised by this section of the public which would be hostile to her intellectualism and emancipation throughout her career.

Yvonne George moved into a ground-floor apartment in Neuilly with desirable decor, where she received many artists and men of letters.

In 1924, well known in Parisian intellectual circles as a charming singer, George became the subject of a passionate love affair with the French poet Robert Desnos, who wrote her numerous poems including the famous J'ai tant rêvé de toi (I have dreamed so much about you). Desnos initiated her into taking opium. It was in this period that Desnos also wrote his novel La Liberté ou l'Amour (Freedom or Love), a work which would be condemned for obscenity by the tribunal de la Seine.

George's performance style is considered as embodying the principles of the French realist song. She left a very small posterity to the public at large. Her musical repertoire contained some 200 songs, but she recorded very few. 21 recordings were made, of which only 16 survive, some of which are repeats of each other. The themes of the songs, however, and her manner of interpretation with a troubled, broken voice, were to influence other singing and speaking performers such as the French singer Barbara. Yvonne George participated in the progress of female emancipation in the inter-war period.

Weakened by the excesses of her lifestyle and especially her drug habits, George fell ill with tuberculosis. Following ineffective treatments, she died in a hotel room near the port of Genoa on 22 April 1930, aged 33.

== Partial discography ==
- J'ai pas su y faire (Cartoux – Costil – Yvain) – 1925
- C'est pour ça qu'on s'aime (Telly – Borel-Clerc) – 1925
- Le petit bossu (inconnu) – 1925
- Je te veux (Erik Satie) 1925
- J'ai pas su y faire (deuxième version) – 1926
- You Know You Belong to Somebody Else – 1926
- Pars (Lenoir) – 1926
- Chanson de marin (Auric) – 1926
- Toute une histoire (Jeanson) – 1926
- La mort du bossu – 1926
- Adieu chers camarades – 1926
- Ô Marseille (Wiener) – 1927
- Chanson de route (Wiener) – 1927
- C'est pour ça qu'on s'aime (deuxième version) – 1928
- Si je ne t'avais pas connu (Boyer – Boyer – Verdun) – 1928
- J'ai pas su y faire (troisième version) – 1928
- Le bossu (deuxième version) – 1928
- Les cloches de Nantes – 1928
- L'autre (Lenoir) – 1928
