= Putnam Aldrich =

American harpsichordist, musicologist, and academic (1904–1975)

Putnam Calder Aldrich (July 14, 1904 – April 18, 1975) was an American harpsichordist, musicologist and Professor of Music at Stanford University. He is credited with creating the Ph.D. music program at Stanford University, for "establishing the first union of the disciplines of musicology and performance technique" and for developing the first graduate program in Early music in the country.

In the introduction to 1978 reprint of Aldrich's Ornamentation in J. S. Bach's Organ Works (1951), Rosalyn Tureck wrote that

Putnum Aldrich was among the first American scholars actively concerned with the art of embellishment. He made a major contribution in underscoring its indispensability.

— Rosalyn Tureck, 'Introduction' in Ornamentation in J. S. Bach's Organ Works

Among his students were Daniel Pinkham, Erich Schwandt(Eastman School of Music and University of Victoria), musicologists George Houle (Stanford University), William Mahrt (Stanford University), Newman Powell, Don Franklin (University of Pittsburgh), Carol Marsh (University of North Carolina - Greensboro), and Margaret Fabrizio. See: List of music students by teacher: A to B#Putnam Aldrich.

== Career ==
=== Education ===
Born in Massachusetts in 1904, Putnam Aldrich grew up in a large family. He was educated at the Moses Brown Preparatory School in Providence, Rhode Island and played in the high school jazz band. In 1926, he graduated from Yale College with a Bachelor of Arts in French literature and received a certificate from the Yale School of Music. He went to England in 1926-27 to study the piano with Tobias Matthay.

Aldrich began studying piano in Paris in 1929 with Wanda Landowska. He soon thereafter switched to playing the harpsichord, despite it being an obscure and obsolete instrument at the time. Aldrich remained Landowska's student and research assistant for 5 years.

After his studies with Landowska, Aldrich moved to the United States. He performed as soloist with the Boston Symphony and the San Francisco Symphony. He also performed as a recitalist and chamber music performer.

Around this time, Putnam also became a student at Harvard University, receiving his M.A. in 1936 for "A Study of Vocal and Instrumental Ornamentation in the Music of the Middle Ages, with Particular Reference to the Relationship between the Two." He later received his Ph.D. from Harvard in 1942 with the dissertation "The Principal Agreements of the Seventeenth and Eighteenth Centuries: A Study in Musical Ornamentation.'

=== Academic positions ===
Putnam Aldrich held the post of visiting lecturer at Princeton University in 1939 and was lecturer and performer at the Berkshire Music Center from 1939 to 1942. Before coming to Stanford in 1950, he held professorial appointments at the University of Texas, Western Reserve University (Cleveland) and Mills College (Oakland).

Aldrich joined the Stanford University faculty in 1950. At Stanford, he taught counterpoint, the history of baroque music, and harpsichord as well as founded the Ph.D. program in music at the university.

Aldrich was the exchange professor at Tokyo University of the Arts in 1964-65.

=== Associations ===
In 1949, Aldrich was a founding member of the "Society for Music in the Liberal Arts College," an organization of music teachers which later became the College Music Society.

He sat on the board of directors of the American Musicological Society in 1951, 1962 and 1966.

Together with Alfred Zighera he founded the Boston Society of Ancient Instruments, and began to give performances on historical instruments. He wrote music criticism for Boston newspapers and articles on subjects such as Bach and Couperin for the Saturday Review (U.S. magazine).

=== Fellowships ===
Putnam received a Fulbright Fellowship and a Guggenheim Fellowship for music research in Italy in 1958.

== Bibliography ==
=== Books ===
- The principal agréments of the seventeenth and eighteenth centuries : a study of musical ornamentation, Thesis—Harvard University 1942
- Ornamentation in J. S. Bach's Organ Works, Da Capo Press, 1978, ©1950
- Rhythm in seventeenth-century Italian monody, with an anthology of songs and dances, New York, W.W. Norton ©1966
- (As Editor) Music for One, Two, and Three voices, Bryn Mawr, Pa. : T. Presser, ©1969

=== Articles and published essays (partial list) ===
- Contributor of "Ornamentation and related articles" to the Harvard Dictionary of Music
- "Points Contrapunctus", Saturday Review, July 31, 1954, p. 50
- "Bach---Motor or Baroque" Saturday Review, January 29, 1955, pp. 50–51
- "Sound and Style", Saturday Review, March 12, 1955, p. 33
- "On 'Translating' Bach", Saturday Review, April 30, 1955, pp. 52–53
- "Couperin Uncorked", Saturday Review, June 30, 1956, pp. 48–49
- "The 'Authentic' Performance of Baroque Music", Essays on Music in Honor of Archibald T. Davison, Cambridge Department of Music, Harvard University, 1957, pp 161–71
- "Musical Performance as a Humanistic Study" College Music Symposium, Vol. 4, (Fall, 1964), pp. 53–58
- "Wanda Landowska's Musique Ancienne" Notes, Second Series, Vol. 27, No. 3 (Mar., 1971), pp. 461–468
