= Erich Schwandt =

Canadian cembalist, organist, musicologist and music educator

Erich Paul Schwandt (July 26, 1935 in San Luis Obispo, California – 2 August 2017 in Victoria, British Columbia) was a Canadian cembalist, organist, musicologist and music educator.

Schwandt studied harpsichord with Putnam Aldrich and gave harpsichord and organ concerts on CBC, throughout Canada and the USA. He taught music history and musicology at the Stanford University and the Eastman School of Music; from 1975 until 2001, he taught at The University of Victoria, Victoria, British Columbia. During that time, he taught music history, musicology, counterpoint, Baroque performance practice, harpsichord – and from the 1980's, organ. For many years, he was Head of Musicology. Also, from the 1980's through Spring of 2013, he was the University Organist (although not given that title), playing for hundreds of convocations and setting a record for being the person who had attended the most convocations in the university's history. He had found and was instrumental in procuring an Alsatian French Classic pipe organ [by Georges Mayer] for the University's main auditorium. His particular academic interest was the relationship between music and dance in the 17th and 18th centuries, and he published articles in publications such as Musical Quarterly, Notes, Fontes Artis Musicae, Canadian University Music Review and The New Grove. He created more than a dozen music editions and reconstructed the Gloria from Erik Satie's Messe des pauvres for a performance at the University of Victoria in 1997.
