= Metropolitan Church of Art of Jesus the Conductor =

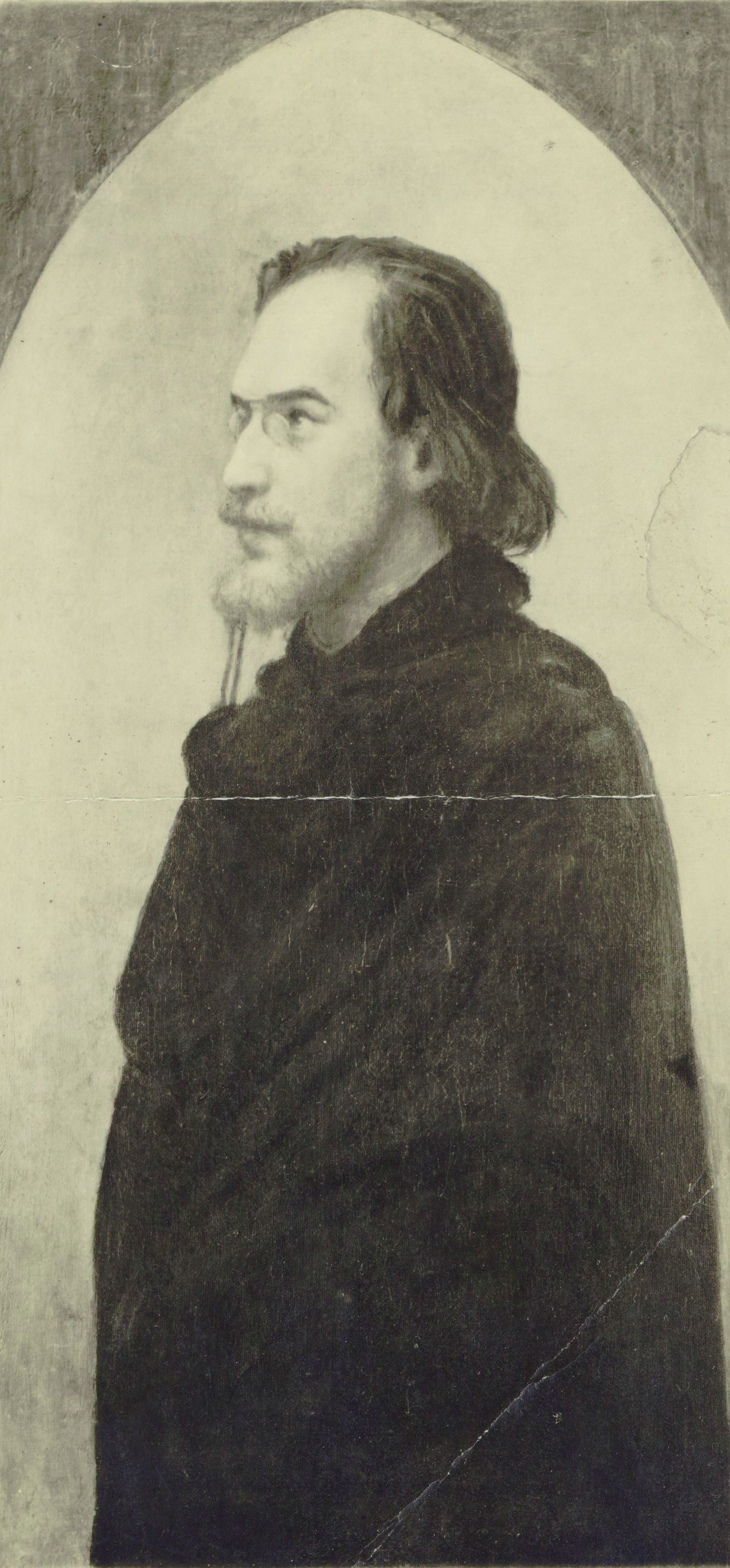
Erik Satie, leader of the Church (c. 1895)

The Église Métropolitaine d'Art de Jésus Conducteur (French for Metropolitan Church of Art of Jesus the Conductor) was a nineteenth-century esoteric Gnostic Christian sect founded by Erik Satie. Satie, a composer and pianist, served as cult's High Priest and Choirmaster and was its only member.

== History ==
L'Église Métropolitaine d'Art de Jésus Conducteur was founded in 1892, following Satie's break from Sâr Joséphin Péladan,"High Priest of Wagnerism" and the head of the revived Rosicrucian (Rose + Croix) Sect in Paris. At this time Satie was pianist at the Café de la Nouvelle Athènes and was associating especially closely with painters. Earlier that same year, Satie made his first abortive attempt at application to the Académie des Beaux-Arts whence a vacancy was left by Ernest Guiraud.

Satie's involvement in the Rosicrucian Sect was at times tumultuous. Although acting as "Master of the Chapel" for the sect, Satie was frustrated by the implication that he was a disciple of Péladan. In 1890, he had become the sect's "official musician." His music was considered acceptable, "mystical" and "ritualistic" albeit not Wagnerian. It is to be remembered that Satie would later declare, when speaking of a distinct, French style, of his own desire to compose music "without the sauerkraut."

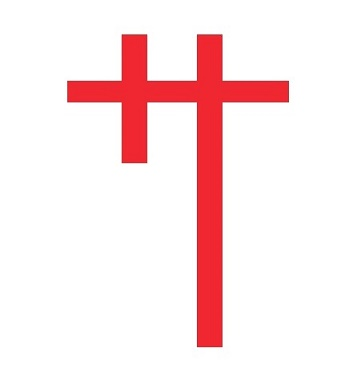
Emblem of the Metropolitan Church of Art of Jesus the Conductor, designed by Satie. It is a Greek cross and Latin cross linked together

Upon founding L'Église Métropolitaine d'Art de Jésus Conducteur, Satie became Parcier et Maître de Chapelle or Parcener and Master of the chapel, establishing his Abbatial Residence at 6 rue Cortot. He began issuing various edicts and excommunications immediately, condemning all "evildoers speculating on human corruption ... to the hatred of righteous persons," as recognised within the Church as "Christians having claims of an aesthetic order." The general mission of the Metropolitan Church of Art is best summarised in Satie's own words:

"We have thus resolved, following the dictates of Our conscience and trusting in God's mercy, to erect in the metropolis of this Frankish nation, which for so many centuries aspired above all others to the glorious title of Elder Daughter of the Church, a Temple worthy of the Saviour, conductor and redeemer of all men; We shall make of it a refuge where the Catholic faith and the Arts, the which are indissolubly bound to it, shall grow and prosper, sheltered from profanity, expanding in all their purity, unsullied by the workings of evil." -- Le Cœur, VIe-VIIe fascicles, Sept.-Oct.1893.

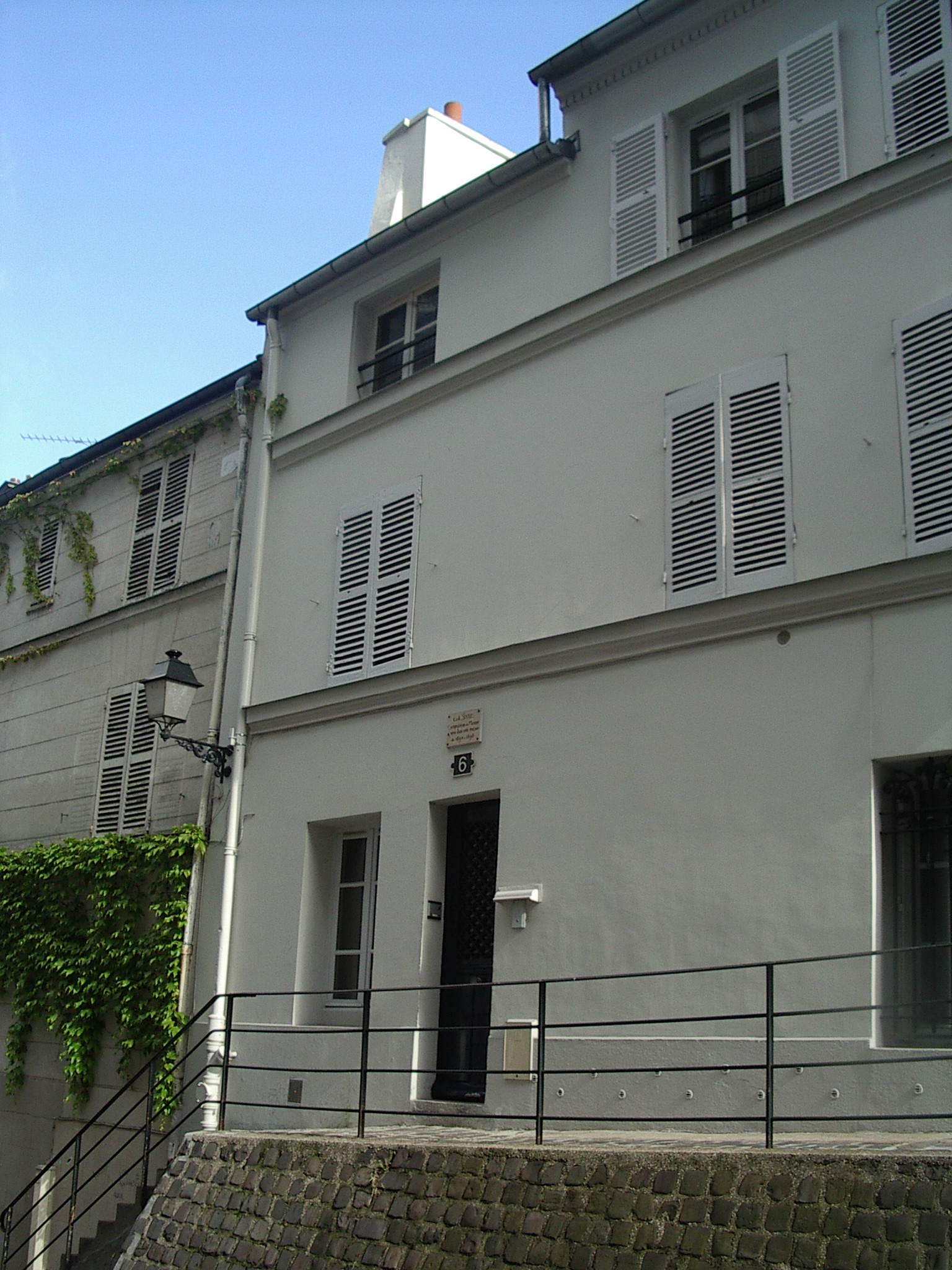
6 Rue Cortot in Montmartre, Paris, where Satie lived from 1890 to 1898. This location served as the "Abbey" of his Church

The various publications of the Metropolitan Church of Art are marked by their bold, flowery, and entirely bombastic language, written in a sort of pseudo-antique French. The writings extol the virtues of artistic sacrifice and abject poverty, which reflect the very lifestyle that Satie and his close affiliates embraced. Commentary on certain affairs of the day was also at times provided, as well as "Church News," which included the arrival of certain church figures to the Eternal City and pleas for "the infidel anglicans" to return "to the bosom of the Catholic Faith."

The cartulary of the Church of Art also served as a vehicle for Satie's vitriolic attacks against various critics of his day. Perhaps most noteworthy among them was Henry Gauthier-Villars, better known by his nom de plume Willy, Satie's bitter enemy. In 1904, the two men came to blows.

Satie is widely acknowledged to have been the only member of the Metropolitan Church of Art. In the Cartulary of the Church, however, there do appear on more than one occasion contributions by a one François de Paule, Lord of the Marches of Savoy.

The final Cartulaire de l'Église Métropolitaine d'Art de Jésus Conducteur, No. 2-63, appeared in June 1895. It concludes with A Prayer for the Worthy and against Sinners, chastising "atheists, blasphemers, free-thinkers, the vain-glorious, resolute Jews, anglican heretics, Simoniac freemasons and others." Earlier that year Satie had published two Brochures, Commune qui mundi nefas (24 January) and Intende votis supplicum (8 March). The suspension of his publications through the Metropolitan Church of Art and his following third abortive attempt at application to the Académie des Beaux-Arts in 1896, upon the vacancy left by Ambroise Thomas, marks the conclusion of what is sometimes considered Satie's "Mystic Period" and the commencement of his adoption of a less religiously affectatious eccentricity.

== Compositions by Satie linked to the Église Métropolitaine epoch ==
Satie's composition most clearly linked to his Église Métropolitaine period later became known as the Messe des pauvres ("Mass of the Poor"). At the time of its composition (1893-1895), Satie referred to it as Grande Messe de l'Église Métropolitaine d'Art.

Other compositions, like the 15 July 1893 Modéré are seen as preparatory studies for the Messe des Pauvres by Satie scholars.
