= Gnossiennes =

Piano compositions by Erik Satie

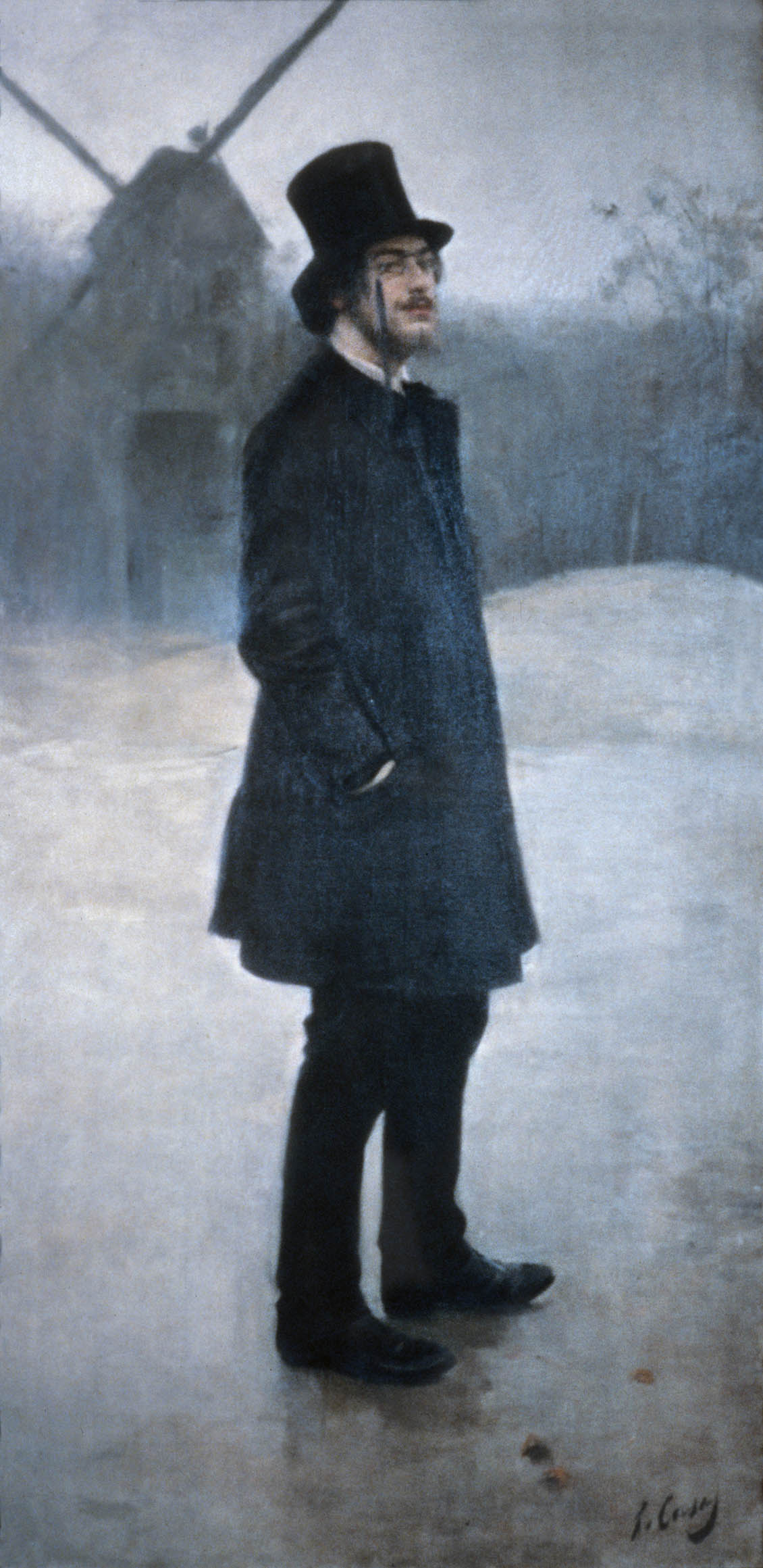
Erik Satie (1891), by Ramon Casas

The Gnossiennes (French pronunciation: [ɲosjɛn]) are several piano compositions by the French composer Erik Satie in the late 19th century. The works are for the most part in free time (lacking time signatures or bar divisions) and highly experimental with form, rhythm and chordal structure. The word was invented by Satie but the term itself existed in French literature before Satie's usage.

== Etymology ==
The etymology of the word gnossienne is contentious, but the word existed in French literature before Satie's usage, and is in the 1865 Larousse Dictionary, referring to the ritual labyrinth dance created by Theseus to celebrate his victory over the Minotaur, first described in the "Hymn to Delos" by Callimachus.

Another explanation is that the word appears to derive from gnosis. Satie was involved in gnostic sects and movements at the time that he began to compose the Gnossiennes.

== Characteristics ==
The Gnossiennes were composed by Satie in the decade following the composition of the Sarabandes (1887) and the Trois Gymnopédies (1888). Like these Sarabandes and Gymnopédies, the Gnossiennes are often considered dances. It is not certain that this qualification comes from Satie himself – the sarabande and the gymnopaedia were at least historically known as dances.

The musical vocabulary of the Gnossiennes is a continuation of that of the Gymnopédies (a development that had started with the 1886 Ogives and the Sarabandes) later leading to more harmonic experimentation in compositions like the Danses gothiques (1893). These series of compositions are all at the core of Satie's characteristic late 19th century style, and in this sense differ from his early salon compositions (like the 1885 "Waltz" compositions published in 1887), his turn-of-the-century cabaret songs (Je te veux), and his post-Schola Cantorum piano solo compositions, starting with the Préludes flasques (pour un chien) in 1912.

A year after Gnosticism had been re-established in 1890 (Gnostic Church of France), Satie was introduced to the Rosicrucian sect by his friend Joséphin Péladan. The work is influenced by occultism and esotericism, which spread in France at the end of the 19th century.

== Trois Gnossiennes ==
Gnossienne No. 1
Performed 16 November 2010

Gnossienne No. 2
Performed 16 November 2010

Gnossienne No. 3
Performed 16 November 2010

These Three Gnossiennes were composed around 1890 and first published in 1893. A revision prior to publication in 1893 is not unlikely; the 2nd Gnossienne may even have been composed in that year (it has "April 1893" as date on the manuscript). The piano solo versions of the first three Gnossiennes are without time signatures or bar lines, which is known as free time.

These Gnossiennes were first published in Le Figaro musical No. 24 of September 1893 (Gnossiennes Nos. 1 and 3, the last one of these then still "No. 2") and in Le Cœur No. 6–7 of September–October 1893 (Gnossienne No. 2 printed as facsimile, then numbered "No. 6").

The first grouped publication, numbered as known henceforth, followed in 1913. By this time Satie had indicated 1890 as composition date for all three. The first Gnossienne was dedicated to Alexis Roland-Manuel in the 1913 reprint. The 1893 facsimile print of the 2nd Gnossienne contained a dedication to Antoine de La Rochefoucauld, not repeated in the 1913 print. This de La Rochefoucauld had been a co-founder of Joséphin Péladan's Ordre de la Rose-Croix Catholique et Esthetique du Temple et du Graal in 1891. By the time of the second publication of the first set of three Gnossiennes, Satie had for some time disassociated himself from the Rosicrucian movement.

Also with respect to the tempo these Gnossiennes follow the Gymnopédies line: slow tempos, respectively Lent (French for Lento/slow), avec étonnement ("with astonishment"), and again Lent.

A sketch containing only two incomplete bars, dated around 1890, shows Satie beginning to orchestrate the 3rd Gnossienne. His idea of orchestration was later realized by Francis Poulenc.

The first and third Gnossiennes share similar chordal structures, rhythms, and thematic references.

In 2026, Madonna sampled Gnossienne No. 1 on a song Betrayal, from her critically acclaimed album Confessions II.

== Gnossiennes Nos. 4–7 ==
Gnossienne No. 4
Performed 16 November 2010

Gnossienne No. 5
Performed 16 November 2010

Gnossienne No. 6
Performed 16 November 2010

Gnossienne No. 7
Performed 16 November 2010

The Gnossiennes Nos. 4–6 were published only in 1968, long after Satie's death. None of these appear to have been numbered, nor even titled as "Gnossienne" by Satie himself. The sequence of these three Gnossiennes in the 1968 publication by Robert Caby does not correspond with the chronological order of composition. It is extremely unlikely that Satie would have seen these compositions as three members of a single set.

=== Gnossienne No. 4 ===
Lent. Composition date on the manuscript: 22 January 1891.

A facsimile of the four manuscript pages of this composition can be seen on this page of Nicolas Fogwall's website.

Composed tonally in D minor even though its key signature is empty, the piece features a bass line centred on its minor key, sounding D, A, D, F, A, D, F, D, A, F, D, A, D. The bass part then transposes into a C minor chord I ostinato, following the pattern C, G, C, E♭, G, C, E♭, C, G, E♭, C, G, C. Section B, usually considered a very inspired section, uses semiquavers to contrast the minor melody of Section A.

=== Gnossienne No. 5 ===
Modéré (French for Moderato). Dated 8 July 1889, this was probably Satie's first composition after the 1888 Gymnopédies: in any case it predates all other known Gnossiennes (including the three published in 1893). The work is somewhat uncharacteristic of the other Gnossiennes not only in its upbeat style, rhythms and less exotic chordal structures but also in its use of time signatures and bar divisions. Gnossienne No. 5 is technically demanding because it has a continuous movement of eighth notes in the left hand that contrast the activity of the right hand, in turn providing unique rhythmic transitions and configurations in a relatively compact musical space. These technical demands contrast other pieces such as Gymnopedie No.1.

=== Gnossienne No. 6 ===
Avec conviction et avec une tristesse rigoureuse ("with conviction and with a rigorous sadness"). Composed nearly eight years after the first, in January 1897.

=== Le Fils des étoiles – Trois morceaux en forme de poire ===
The Le Fils des étoiles ("The son of the stars") incidental music (composed 1891) contains a Gnossienne in the first act. For this one the naming as "Gnossienne" is definitely by Satie (as apparent from the correspondence with his publisher). As a result of that, this music is sometimes known as the 7th Gnossienne. That part of the Le Fils des étoiles music was re-used as Manière de commencement ("A way to begin"), the first of the seven movements of the Trois morceaux en forme de poire ("Three pieces in the shape of a pear").
