= Gymnopédies =

1888 piano compositions by Erik Satie

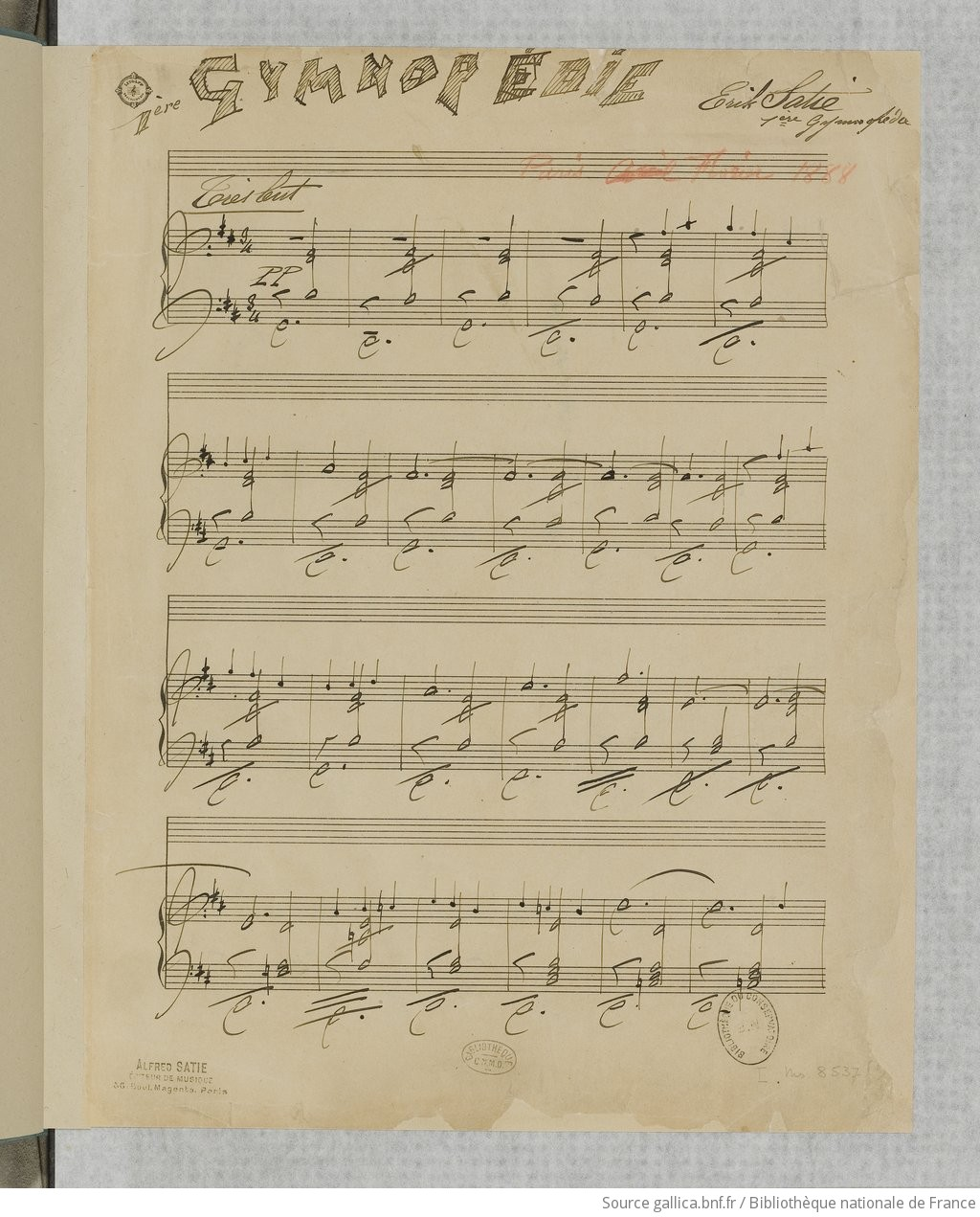
Beginning of 1st Gymnopédie in the autograph

The Gymnopédies (French pronunciation: [ʒim.nɔ.pe.di]), or Trois Gymnopédies ('Three Nude Dances"), are three piano compositions written by French composer and pianist Erik Satie. He completed the whole set by 2 April 1888, but they were at first published individually: the first and the third compositions were published in 1888, while the second would not be published until 1895.

The pieces are each about three minutes long or nine to ten minutes if played in full, and known for their melancholy mood and slight dissonance. They are among Satie's best-known compositions, and are seen as a precursor to ambient music.

== History ==
The work's unusual title comes from the French form of gymnopaedia, the ancient Greek word for an annual festival where young men danced either naked or, perhaps figuratively, simply unarmed. The source of the title has been a subject of debate. Satie and his friend Alexis Roland-Manuel maintained that he adopted it after having read Gustave Flaubert's novel Salammbô, while others see a poem by J. P. Contamine de Latour as the source of Satie's inspiration, since the first Gymnopédie was published in the magazine La Musique des familles in the summer of 1888 together with an excerpt of Latour's poem Les Antiques, where the term appears.

Oblique et coupant l'ombre un torrent éclatant
Ruisselait en flots d'or sur la dalle polie
Où les atomes d'ambre au feu se miroitant
Mêlaient leur sarabande à la gymnopédie

Slanting and shadow-cutting a bursting torrent
Streamed in floods of gold upon the polished flagstone
Where the atoms of flaming amber gleaming
Mingled their sarabande with the gymnopædia.

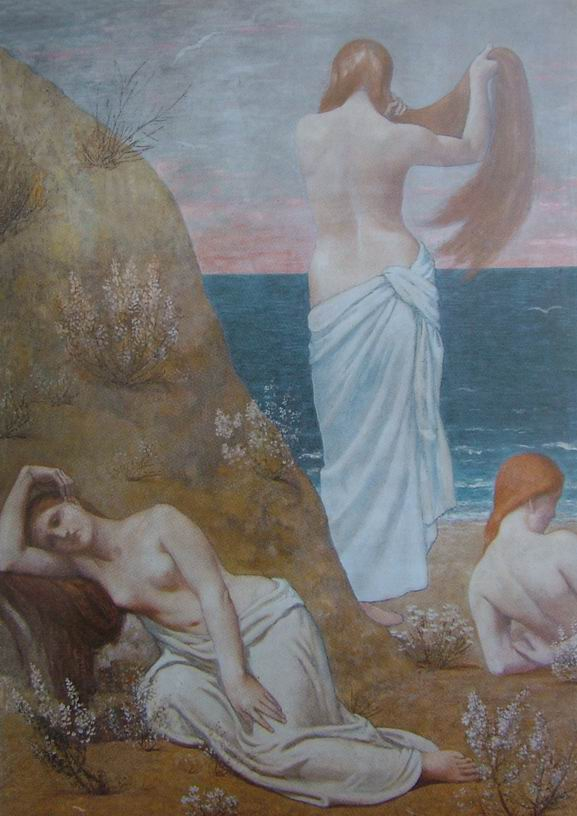
Jeunes filles au bord de la mer (1879), painting by Pierre Puvis de Chavannes

It remains uncertain, however, whether the poem was composed before or after the music. Satie could have picked up the term from a dictionary such as Peter Lichtenthal's Dictionnaire de Musique (1839), where gymnopédie is defined as a "nude dance, accompanied by song, which youthful Spartan maidens danced on certain occasions", (Note: For more information on Lichtenthal, see de:Peter Lichtenthal (in German) and search for "Dizionario e bibliografia della musica". Encyclopedias List (German) (in Italian).) following a similar definition from Jean-Jacques Rousseau's Dictionnaire de Musique.

Pierre Puvis de Chavannes' paintings in a symbolist style might have been an inspiration for the atmosphere Satie wanted to evoke with his Gymnopédies.

== Music ==
I. Lent et douloureux
Performed by Robin Alciatore, from Musopen

These short, atmospheric pieces are written in 3/4 time, with each sharing a common theme and structure.

1. Lent et douloureux (D major / D minor)
2. Lent et triste (C major)
3. Lent et grave (A minor)

The melodies of the pieces use deliberate, but mild, dissonances against the harmony, producing a piquant, melancholy effect that matches the performance instructions, which are to play each piece "painfully" (douloureux), "sadly" (triste), or "gravely" (grave). The first few bars of Gymnopédie No. 1 (shown below) consist of an alternating progression of two major seventh chords, the first on the subdominant, G, and the second on the tonic, D.

== Reception ==
Beginning of 1st Gymnopédie

By the end of 1896, Satie's popularity was waning and his financial situation deteriorating. Claude Debussy, a friend of Satie's whose popularity was on the rise, helped draw public attention to Satie's work. In February 1897, Debussy orchestrated the third and first Gymnopédies; when Debussy published the scores two years later, he reversed the numbering, with Satie's first becoming Debussy's third, and vice versa.

== Legacy ==
Since the second half of the 20th century, the Gymnopédies have often been erroneously described as part of Satie's body of furniture music, perhaps because of how John Cage has interpreted them. Collectively, the Gymnopédies are regarded as an important precursor to modern ambient music.

The first and second Gymnopédies were arranged by Dick Halligan for the group Blood, Sweat & Tears under the title "Variations on a Theme by Erik Satie" on the group's eponymous album, released in 1968. The recording received a Grammy Award the following year for Best Contemporary Instrumental Performance.

In 1980, Dame Cleo Laine and Sir James Galway released a version for jazz vocalist and flute entitled "Drifting, Dreaming (Gymnopédie No.1)", with lyrics by Don Read. The same year, Gary Numan produced a track called "Trois Gymnopedies (First Movement)", which appeared on the B-side of the single "We Are Glass".

The post-Jane's Addiction band, Deconstruction, covers a portion of Gymnopédie No. 1 on the track "Wait for History" on their 1994 self-titled album.

A sample of Gymnopédie No. 1 is featured in the Janet Jackson single "Someone to Call My Lover" (2001), which peaked at number 3 on the Billboard Hot 100.

Gymnopédies have been heard in numerous movies and television shows, such as the documentary Man on Wire, Wes Anderson's The Royal Tenenbaums, and the Community episode "Critical Film Studies".

The Woody Allen film Another Woman (1988) and the Louis Malle film My Dinner with Andre (1981) both use Gymnopédie No. 1 in their soundtracks.

Gymnopédie No. 1 is also featured in season one, episode seven of Nirvanna the Band the Show, "The Buffet", the opening credits to which are also a reference to My Dinner With Andre.

The Japanese animated drama film The Disappearance of Haruhi Suzumiya (2010) prominently features all three Gymnopédies, and they are included in the film's soundtrack release as a bonus disc, including Satie's Gnossiennes and his composition "Je te veux".

Mother 3 features Gymnopédie No. 1 in its soundtrack as Leder's Gymnopedie.

In 2007, Wilhelm Kaiser-Lindemann arranged the first and the third Gymnopédie for The 12 Cellists of the Berlin Philharmonic. Jack DeJohnette included a tribute to Gymnopédies in his 2016 album Return.

In 2018, Fernando Perdomo included a portion of Gymnopedie No. 1 on his album Out to Sea.

In 2021, violinist Fenella Humphreys released an arrangement of Gymnopédie No.1 for violin. Stephan Koncz, cellist in the Berlin Philharmonic and the Made in Berlin quartet, wrote a string quartet piece called A New Satiesfaction (a portmanteau of "Satie" and "satisfaction"), based on Gymnopédie No.1, which was recorded by the quartet for their first violinist Ray Chen's album The Golden Age.

In the 2025 film Pillion, the character Ray plays Gymnopédie No.1 on the piano. It is also featured on the film's soundtrack.
