= Je te veux =

1903 sung waltz by Erik Satie

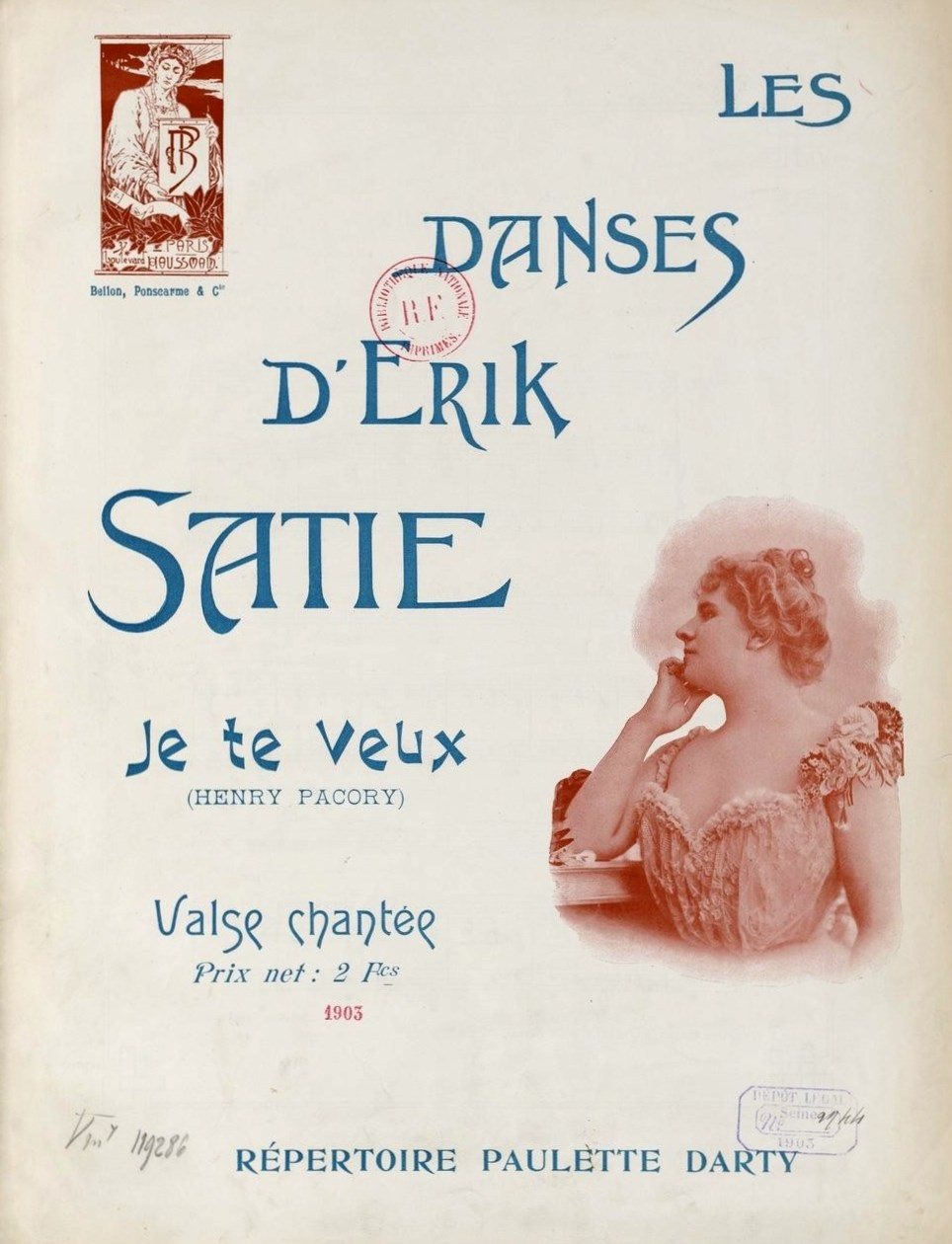
Cover of the original 1903 sheet music for Je te veux

Je te veux (French pronunciation: [ʒə tə vø], lit. 'I Want You') is a sung waltz, or valse chantée, by Erik Satie to erotic lyrics by Henry Pacory. Its two verses and repeated chorus were written for Paulette Darty, whose accompanist Satie had been and who first sang it in 1903 at La Scala, a cabaret in Paris.

Je te veux was registered with SACEM on 20 November 1902, but Alexis Roland-Manuel has argued that was actually composed earlier, in 1897 and as a work for solo piano. What is not disputed is that Satie composed various versions: for piano and voice, as published in 1903; for an orchestra of brass instruments; for full orchestra, with a trio section added between the chorus and the second verse; and at some point for solo piano including this added trio section.

In 1925 Je te veux was recorded by Yvonne George. Other singers who have performed it include Mathé Altéry, Régine Crespin, Nicolai Gedda, Jessye Norman, Marie Devellereau and Angela Gheorghiu. More recently jazz vocalist Cécile McLorin Salvant sang the song on Jacky Terrasson's 2012 album Gouache.

Composer John Cage, as part of his nine short songs, "Sonnekus²" (1985), instructs his performer to sing the piano-and-voice version of Satie's Je te veux.

== Lyrics ==
Refrain:
J'ai compris ta détresse,
Cher amoureux,
Et je cède à tes vœux,
Fais de moi ta maîtresse.
Loin de nous la sagesse,
Plus de tristesse,
J'aspire à l'instant précieux
Où nous serons heureux;
Je te veux.

1. Je n'ai pas de regrets
Et je n'ai qu'une envie:
Près de toi là, tout près,
Vivre toute ma vie,
Que mon cœur soit le tien
Et ta lèvre soit mienne,
Que ton corps soit le mien,
Et que toute ma chair soit tienne.

Refrain

2. Oui je vois dans tes yeux
La divine promesse.
Que ton cœur amoureux
Vient chercher ma caresse.
Enlacés pour toujours,
Brûlés des mêmes flammes,
Dans des rêves d'amours
Nous échangerons nos deux âmes.

Refrain

Translation:

Refrain:
I understand your distress
Dear lover
And I yield to your wishes
Make me your mistress
Far from us is wisdom
No more sadness
I look forward to the beautiful moment
When we will be happy.
I want you.

1. I have no regrets
And I have only one desire
Beside you there so close
To live all my life
May my heart be yours
May your lips be mine
May your body be mine
And may all my flesh be yours.

Refrain

2. Yes I see in your eyes
The divine promise
That your loving heart
Comes looking for my caress
Joined forever
Burning in the same flames,
In a dream of love
We will swap our two souls.

Refrain
