= Greco-Roman relations in classical antiquity =

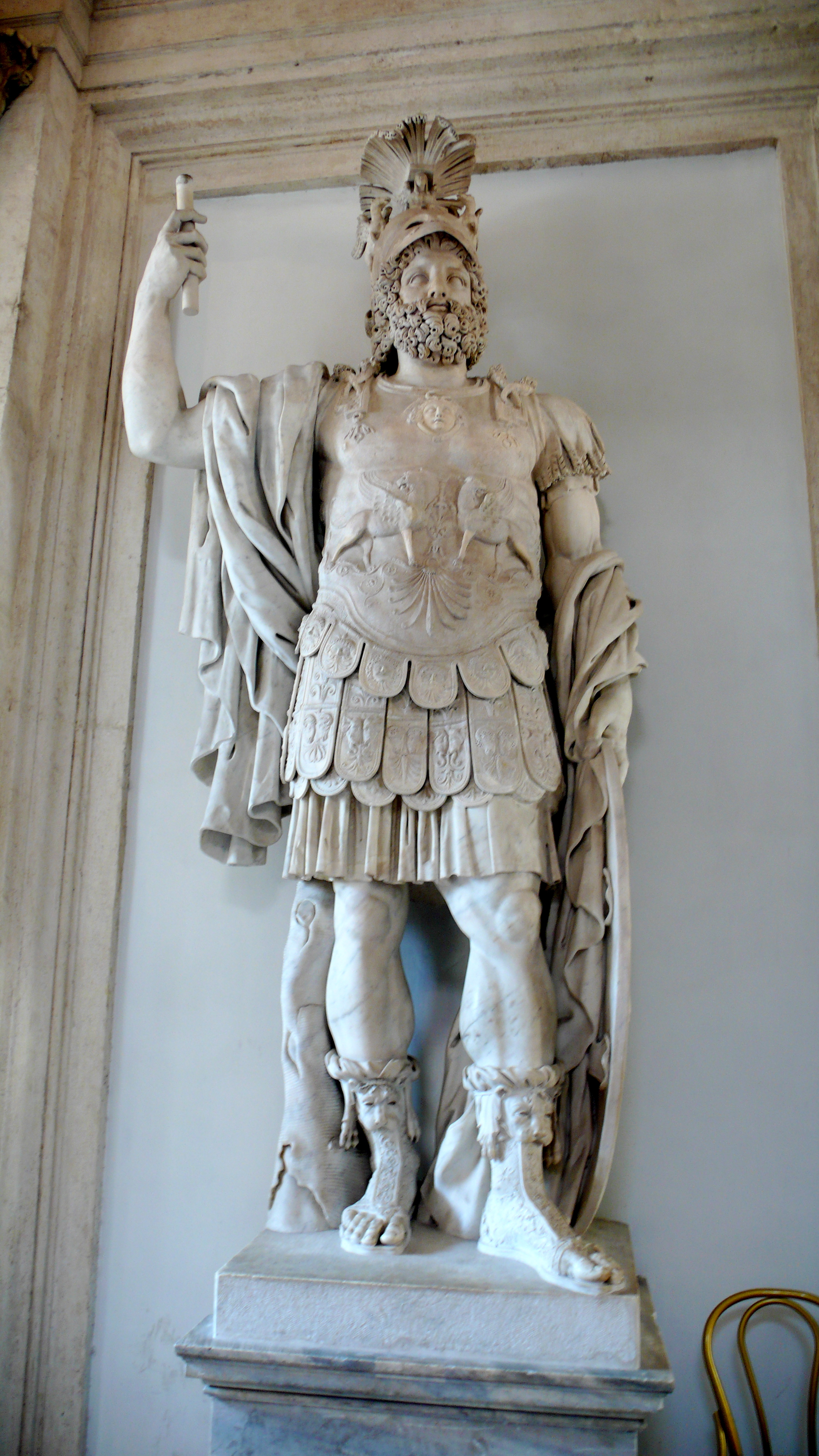
Statue of Mars from the Forum of Nerva, early 2nd century AD, based on an Augustan-era original that in turn used a Hellenistic Greek model of the 4th century BC, Capitoline Museums

The contacts between the Roman Republic and later the Roman Empire with the Greeks began early in Roman history, as the Latins originated in the vicinity of the Greek colonies in the western Mediterranean. The Greeks initially took little notice of the Romans who were living on their periphery and borrowing heavily from Greek culture, but contacts greatly expanded in the course of Roman expansion in southern Italy, Greece and Asia Minor. Roman culture was highly influenced by the Greeks; as Horace said, Graecia capta ferum victorem cepit ("Captive Greece captured her rude conqueror"). Under Roman rule, Greco-Roman relations flourished but were frequently tinged with resentment: the Greeks retained a sense of cultural superiority, while many Romans considered the subjugated Greeks as beneath them and sought to defend their culture from what they perceived as excessive Greek influence. After Christianisation in Late Antiquity, Greeks primarily identified as Romans, but tensions rose with the Latin-speaking Romans in the West, who continued to see Easterners as "Greeks" and often as rivals.

== Early influence ==
Greek people had settled in Southern Italy and Sicily since the 8th century BC, allowing the Italian tribes to come into contact with Greek culture from an early period and bringing them under Greek cultural influence. Italian use of the alphabet, weights and measures, and temples were derived from the Greeks. Although the Greeks referred to themselves as "Hellenes", the Romans referred to them as Graeci, since Cumae, the first Greek colony in mainland Italy, was populated by settlers from the town of Graea in central Greece. Greek merchants traded at the Forum Boarium on the Tiber as early as the 8th century BC, and Greek influence on even conservative Roman traditions such as law or religion can be discerned in the 3rd century BC. The earliest known Roman coins were minted in Greek-speaking Neapolis, and were inscribed Ῥωμαῖων, which was both the Romans' Greek-language name for themselves and the Greeks' name for Romans. The use of Greek for the inscription reflected how Greek was still more widespread in 4th century BC Italy than Latin was.

The Romans came into close contact with Greek culture during the conquest of Magna Graecia, Mainland Greece and the "Hellenistic countries" (countries that had been marked by Greek culture and language) in the 2nd and the 1st centuries BC. The Romans saw in Hellenistic cities a lifestyle that could be more comfortable than theirs. Formerly sparsely-ornamented houses acquired columns, statues, mosaics on the floors, tapestries and paintings on the walls. Meals were taken while reclining instead of sitting, conforming to Greek custom. The Romans also derived knowledge in trade, banking, administration, art, literature, philosophy and earth science from Greek influence. The comitium, a stone, circular, tiered assembly place in the Forum, was modelled on Sicilian Greek designs around 264 BC. Returning Roman generals built wooden imitations of Greek temples, and wooden Greek-style complexes to exhibit plunder from the Greeks. In 184 BC, Cato the Elder built Rome's first basilica, based on Greek design. One of the earliest all-stone structures in Rome was a round Greek-style temple built in 150 BC with looted Greek marble.

=== Greek views of Romans ===
On the other hand, the Greeks traditionally associated Italy with the Trojans or Greek veterans of the Trojan War, and Greek influence such as the cult of Dioskouroi are evident in Latium from the 7th century BC. Under the ever-growing influence of the Italiote Greeks, the Romans acquired their own national origin myth sometime during the early Republican era (500–300 BC). It was centred on the figure of Aeneas, a supposed Trojan survivor of the destruction of Troy by the Achaean Greeks, as related in the poet Homer's epic the Iliad (composed c. 800 BC). The legend provided the Romans with a heroic "Homeric" pedigree, as well as a (spurious) ethnic distinctiveness from the other Latins. It also provided a rationale (as poetic revenge for the destruction of Troy) for Rome's hostilities against, and eventual subjugation of, the Greek cities of southern Italy, especially Taras (mod. Taranto) in the period ending 275 BC.

Greek knowledge of the Romans before ca. 200 BC was scant; most Greeks viewed the Romans as remote and not of immediate concern, beyond the fascination of Greek intellectuals for legends such as the descent of Romulus from Aeneas. In the 4th century BC, Heraclides Ponticus regarded Rome as a "Greek city." Eratosthenes listed Rome together with Carthage, India and Ariana as "refined barbarians", using these peoples as examples to avoid prejudging barbarians. Pyrrhus, during his war against Rome, was surprised to find that Roman forces were not disorganised barbarians, as he expected. Some Greek cities in Italy such as Locri or Agrigentum formed positive or negative views of Rome depending on their stance in the Punic Wars, but these did not reflect general Greek attitudes. The first Roman province beyond the Alps, Gallia Narbonensis, was established at the request of the Greek city state of Massalia, Rome's ally against Carthage, when they sought Roman help against hostile local tribes in 125 BC.

In admiration of the Roman military successes, Hellenistic states such as the Seleucids and Ptolemaic Egypt adopted elements of Roman military organisation and equipment; the Seleucids seem to have organised a parade inspired by the Roman triumph. The cult of the personified Rome, Dea Roma, was first institutionalised in the Greek East, by the city of Smyrna in 195 BC, which was under Roman protection from the threat of Seleucid King Antiochus III. The cult became established in Athens by the 2nd century BC, where it was also designed to reflect Rome's protection for the Hellenic city-states, and spread to the Romans themselves in the 4th century. 1st and 2nd century BC Antigonid Macedonia, which ruled much of Hellenistic Greece, hardly adopted any Roman cultural elements, and their material culture was largely untouched by Roman contact.

== Pax Romana ==
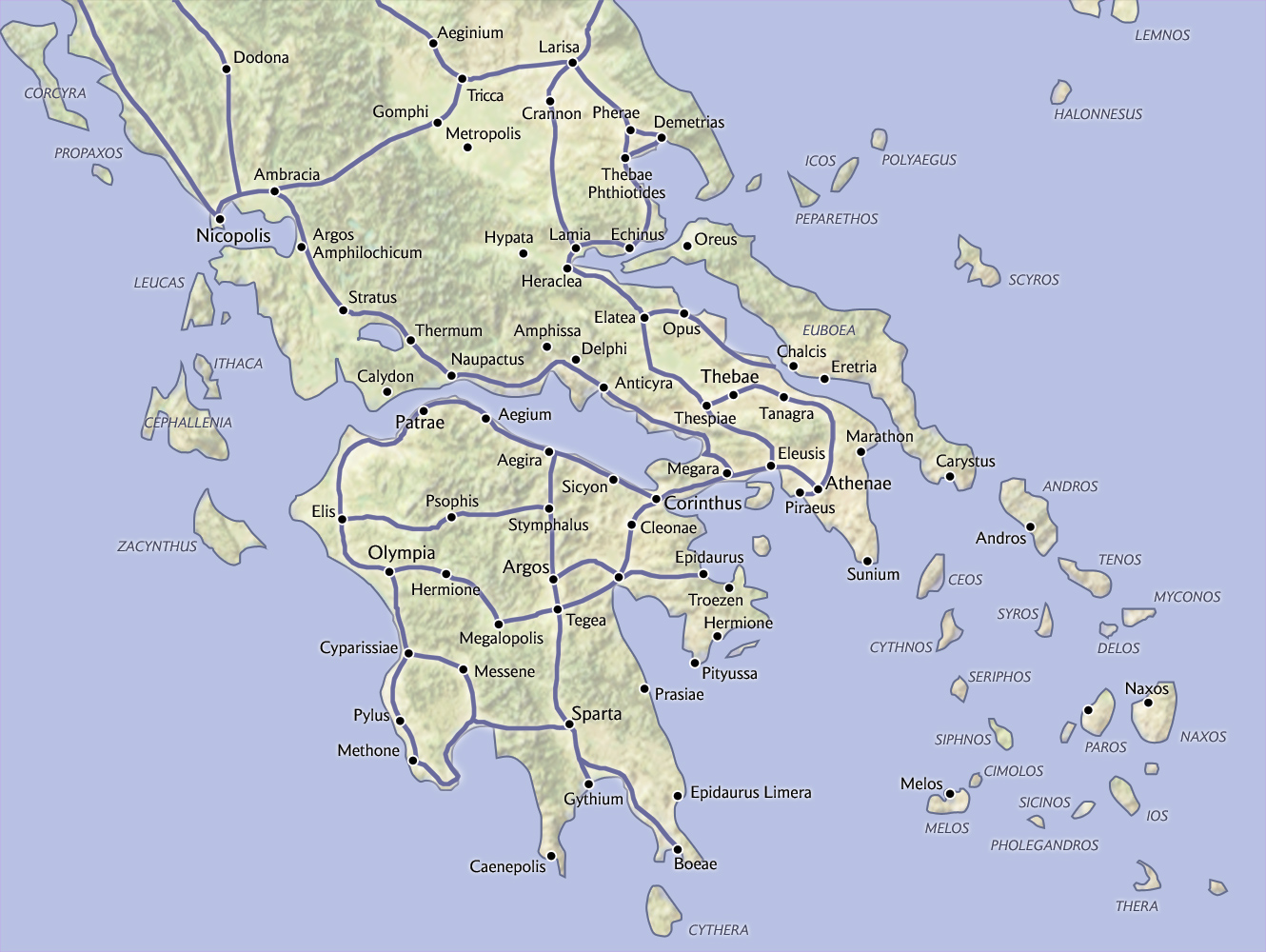
Roman roads and cities in Greece

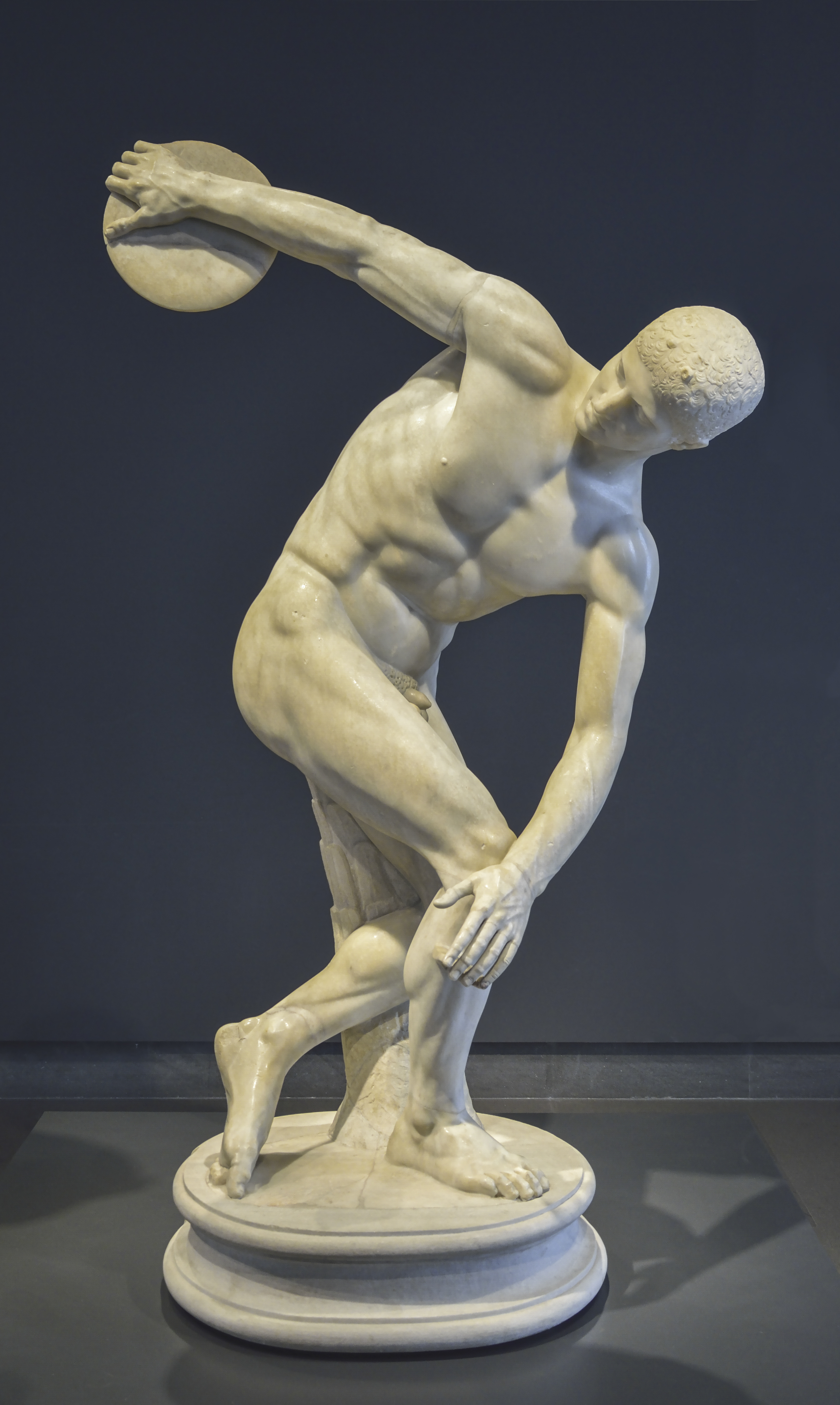
The Discobolus, a Roman marble version of a lost 5th century BC Greek bronze original, depicting a discus thrower.

In the last century BC it was also seen as a necessity to be able to speak Greek as well as Latin. The everyday interpenetration of the two languages is indicated by bilingual inscriptions, which sometimes even switch back and forth between Greek and Latin. The epitaph of a Greek-speaking soldier, for instance, might be written primarily in Greek, with his rank and unit in the Roman army expressed in Latin. In the Roman East, laws and official documents were regularly translated into Greek from Latin. Roman commentaries testify that Roman couples even used Greek for pillow talk. The identification of Romans with Greek became so close that some Roman writers in the 1st century BC and 1st century began to entertain the claim that Latin was an Aeolic Greek dialect. In 86, Domitian established the Capitoline festival, a Greek-style athletics and music festival, which not only appealed to Rome's large Greek immigrant community but increasingly also native Romans. So popular was the festival that, when Domitian was overthrown, the festival was not revoked alongside Domitian's other acts.

Roman culture formed part of a broader Greco-Roman culture and shared common ideals with the Greeks in terms of culture and civilization, partly because of the Greeks who were voluntarily or involuntarily in Rome. A common theme that emerged in Greco-Roman literature was the desire to venerate and emulate Alexander the Great. Towards the end of the Republic, with the shift towards military strongman rule in Rome, Romans began to identify with Alexander, who inspired their own empire-building and glory-seeking. For example, Julius Caesar was presented as successor to Alexander, and Roman elites worshipped Alexander. Romans frequently collected objects associated with Alexander, such as Pompey who wore Alexander's cloak, and Augustus who used a signet ring with Alexander's image. The tomb of Augustus was modelled after Alexander's tomb.

Although Greeks and Romans had friendly ties due to their similarities, they both sought to differentiate themselves, often through language, customs, and literature.

=== Greco-Roman exchanges in Greece ===
The Roman emperors encouraged the preservation of Greek customs in Neapolis, such as the continued use of Greek for most public epigraphy, or when Augustus encouraged Romans in Neapolis to dress as Greeks and vice versa. Roman elites hence used Neapolis as a space to freely indulge in Greek lifestyles, in ways which were not yet acceptable in Rome. However, by the time of Nero and Domitian these activities had spread to Rome itself. The Roman Emperor Nero visited Greece in AD 66, and performed at the Ancient Olympic Games, despite the rules against non-Greek participation. He was honoured with a victory in every contest, and in the following year, he proclaimed the freedom of the Greeks at the Isthmian Games in Corinth, just as Flamininus had over 200 years previously. Nero was also Archon of Athens and was initiated into the mysteries of Demeter.

It was popular for young 1st century BC Romans to study in Athens and perfect their knowledge of rhetoric at the large schools of philosophy. The city of Sparta was a major tourist attraction for the Romans from the 1st century BC to the 4th century, who sought to see 'vestiges' (in reality, artificial revivals) of Sparta's "Lycurgan customs" of physical training such as the sphaireis ball tournament, the battle of Platanistas, the festivals of Artemis Orthia, the Gymnopaediae and the Hyacinthia.

The city of Corinth, where the Roman provincial governor resided with his staff, was particularly close to Rome; Corinthian coins were based on Roman ones, Corinthian pottery exhibited Western influences, Augustus ordered much rebuilding in the city, and Corinth was home to one of the earliest overseas Capitolia. The city became Latin-speaking until the reign of Hadrian. Greek cities like Ephesus or Athens flourished during the long era of peace (Pax Romana). Though Greek, cities like Ephesus were not explicitly distinctive from Roman cities. One area of strong Roman influence on the Greeks was the rapid spread and popularity of gladiatorial combat in the Greek East, complete with Latin loanwords for gladiatorial terminology.

=== Roman backlash ===
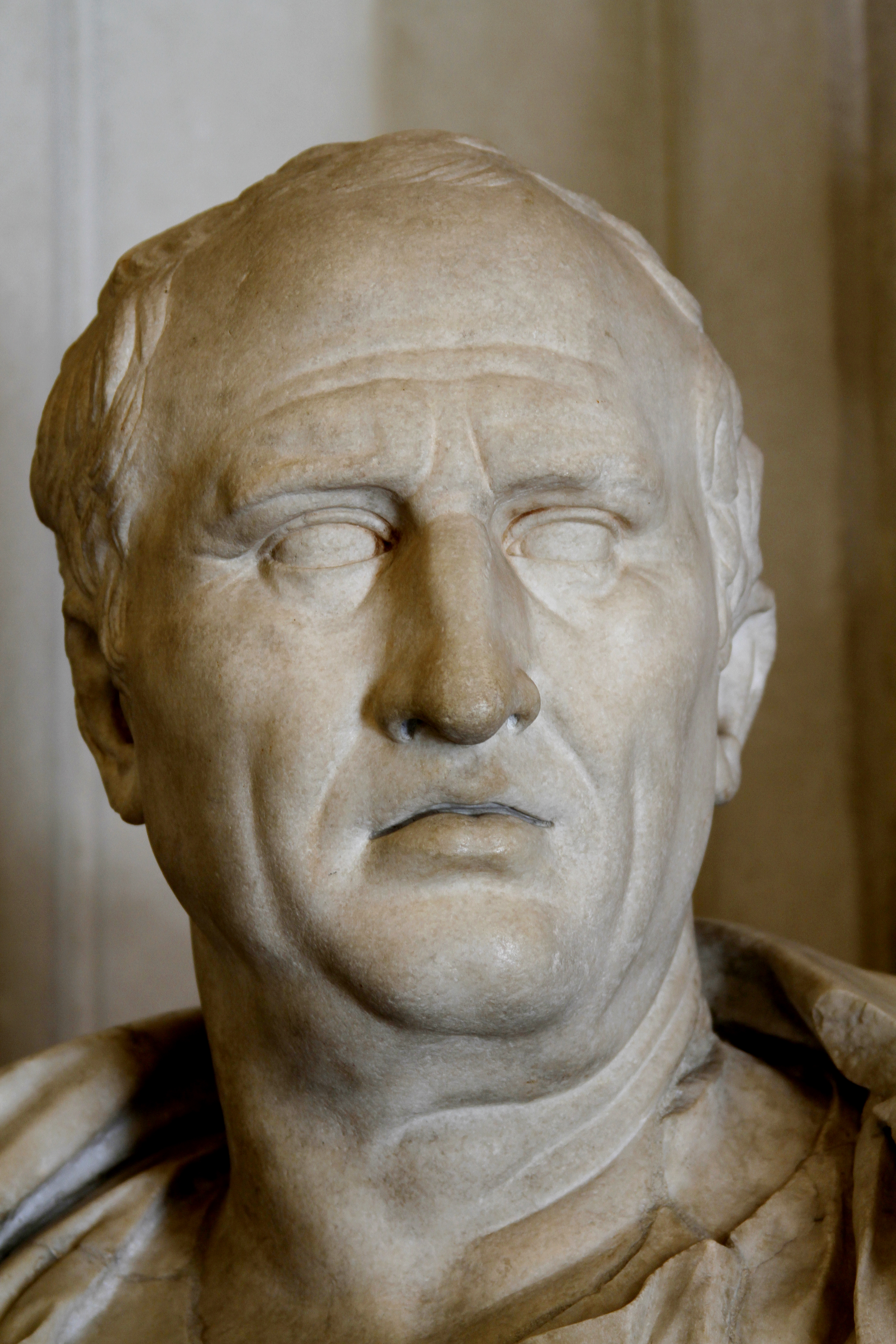
Bust of Cicero, prominent translator of Greek philosophy into Latin and critic of excessive Greek influence in Rome

Some Romans resisted this Greek influence on every aspect of life. Roman elites who admired elements of Greek acculturation nevertheless considered it unacceptable to fully accept Greek identity as a hellenistēs, and names such as semi-graecus (half-Greek) were not considered positive. According to Cassius Dio, a Greco-Roman from the East, Romans typically used the term Graecus as a negative reference to the lowly origin of a Greek person. Roman writings frequently stereotyped the Greeks as untrustworthy, debauched and overly luxurious. For example, Cato the Elder prophesied Rome's demise; he considered everything Greek to be suspect; he even mistrusted Greek doctors and claimed that they plotted to poison Romans. Roman aristocrats warned of Greek influences corrupting Roman morals or Roman religious piety, and believed that excessive imitation of the Graeculus "Greekling" (a Roman slur for Greeks popularised by Cicero) would lead to the collapse of Rome. Roman perceptions of Greeks mirrored the earlier Greek perceptions of Persians: as a formerly upright and militarily strong people who had become weak, decadent and dishonest. Augustus initiated a wave of restoration of public buildings and revivals of ancestral cults with the stated objective of purging Rome of Greek luxuria.

Under the influence of such anti-Greek sentiments, Romans sometimes avoided using the Greek language in certain situations: for instance, Cato the Elder and Gaius Marius would refuse to use Greek in an official capacity despite continuing to adopt some elements of Greek culture and intellectual life. It was mandatory to use only Latin in the Senate, and Roman magistrates avoided using the Greek language to conduct diplomacy with Greeks, including in Greece. While Crassus and Atticus both spoke Greek like native speakers, Augustus, despite his interest in Greek studies, was not fluent in Greek and avoided writing in that language. Cicero noted that some Romans would deliberately speak Greek with mistakes to sound more 'Roman', and he opposed Lucretius' belief that Greek was superior to Latin at expressing philosophical concepts (egestas patrii sermonis). The emperor Claudius tried to limit the use of Greek, and on occasion revoked the citizenship of those who lacked Latin. Even in addressing the Roman Senate, however, he drew on his own bilingualism in communicating with Greek-speaking ambassadors. Suetonius quotes him as referring to "our two languages," and the employment of two imperial secretaries, one for Greek and one Latin, dates to his reign.

In clothing, Roman frequently adopted Greek footwear such as solea (sandals) or soccus (soft slippers) which were more comfortable than the calceus (traditional Roman boot). However, Roman writers repeatedly condemned it as effeminate to wear them in public, until the reign of Hadrian. Nevertheless, some publicly wore Greek-style sandals to "go with the crowd". Romans also bore similar contempt for fellow Romans who wore the rectangular Greek himation/pallium with a Greek ankle-length tunic, instead of the semi-circular Roman toga with a Roman knee-length tunic. The himation was strictly limited to private casual wear, and as late as the 160s, it was considered a major indiscretion when a North African delegate showed up to Septimius Severus' banquet wearing one instead of a toga. For Romans, the idiom a toga ad pallium (to go from toga to the Greek-style pallium) meant to drop from a high status to a low one, although not as low as the bracati (people who use trousers).

Tensions carried over into political policy. Roman writers associated the Greek cultural tendencies of Nero and Domitian with their despotic reputations. Almost all Latin writers used the life of Alexander the Great as a cautionary tale: depicting Alexander as a tyrant and a violent madman whose empire was short-lived as compared to the Roman one. For Emperor Trajan, Greek intellectuals and notables were to be regarded as tools for local administration, and not be allowed to fancy themselves in a privileged position. As Pliny said in one of his letters at the time, it was official policy that Greek civic elites be treated according to their status as notionally free, but not put on an equal footing with their Roman rulers.

=== Greek responses to Roman domination ===
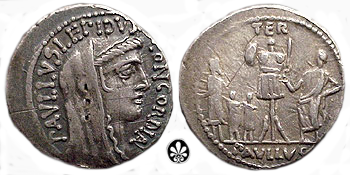
Roman coin showing Lucius Aemilius Paullus on the right, touching trophy; standing to the left as captives, the King Perseus of Macedon and his two sons.

Conversely, some Greeks held the Romans in disdain, who had devastated their homelands, robbed temples and public buildings, decimated the population and brought many Greeks to Rome as slaves. Aemilius Paulus, the victor of the Battle of Pydna in Greece in 168 BC, is said to have personally sold 150,000 Greeks to Rome as slaves. Enslaved Greek teachers, doctors, entertainers were brought to Rome in large numbers, alongside vast quantities of looted Greek art decorating Roman forums, temples and villas. Greek leaders initially denounced the Romans as barbarians that had to be kept out of Greece, arguing that their treatment of captured cities was 'savage' (ὠμός) and 'lawless' (παρανομία), standard Greek criticisms of those whom they labelled 'barbarians'. Polybius similarly described Romans as greedy, brutal and overly religious, similar to descriptions of other 'barbarians'. The Roman playwright Plautus made jokes concerning the Greeks' continued use of "barbarian" to refer to the Romans. Strabo lamented in the 1st century that Greek-inhabited southern Italy had undergone "barbarisation" by Romanisation. Both Romans and Greeks denigrated "barbarians" as warlike and cruel, but the Greek concept of "barbarian" was more closely linked to race and language, while the Roman concept of "barbarian" was aligned more closely with culture and morals. Hence, the Roman concept of the civic community (civitas) was more open to integration than the Greek equivalent (polis).

The Greeks had their own memories of independence, a commonly acknowledged sense of cultural superiority, and instead of seeing themselves as Roman, disdained Roman rule. The Greeks who did accept a sense of 'Romanness" did so selectively according to their preferences and self-interest, without neglecting their own Greek cultural heritage, for instance, participating in certain Roman festivals like Saturnalia to orientate their schedules to the Roman calendar. Greeks still perceived themselves as independent city-states in partnership with the Roman people (socii populi Romani) and saw 'Romanness' as equivalent to other regional labels. The use of the toga was unlikely to have been mandatory in the Greek East; Greeks generally used their own himation rather than the Roman toga for public functions. Greek himations vastly outnumber togas on statuary in the Greek East, with the exception of Roman administrative centers such as Corinth and Gortyn, or families with very close relations to Rome. The city of Nicopolis, which Augustus founded at the site of his camp during the campaign against Mark Antony to be the site of the Actian Games, refused to accept the status of a Roman colonia (unlike Corinth) due to its pride in its Greek identity.

While Dionysius of Halicarnassus explained that the Greeks of his time, in the late 1st century BC, generally saw Romans as barbarians, he argued instead that Romans "are Greeks." Dionysius claimed that the Romans were not only Greek in cultural values but also ancestry, portraying the success of Rome as a consequence of their "Greekness". This narrative reinforced the Greek claim to cultural and political leadership over the world's peoples. Greek grammarians including Dionysius, Philoxenus of Alexandria and Tyrannion developed the theory that Latin was derived from an Aeolic Greek dialect. Aelius Aristides praised Rome for bringing peace, but insisted that Rome's importance came from the momentary politics of the era, while Athens was inherently great and the source of all value, calling Greece "the center of the whole earth". Later, the Greek physician Galen referred to the Romans as "born barbarians but cultivate the ways of the Greeks."

=== Developments in the 2nd and 3rd centuries ===
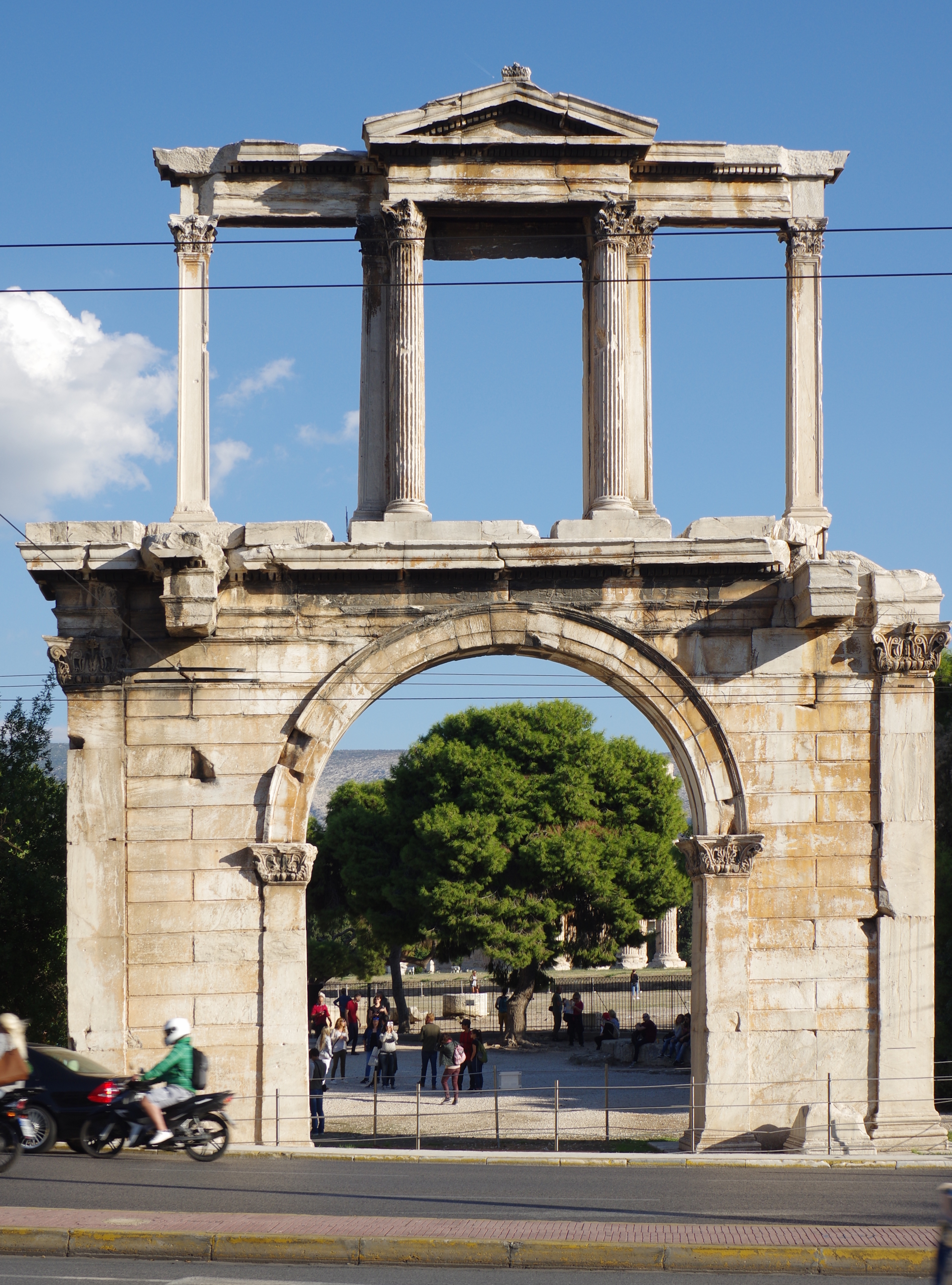
The Arch of Hadrian, in Athens, one of the public work projects that the philhellenic Hadrian ordered in Greece

However, Greek culture grew more acceptable later in the 2nd century. When Emperor Hadrian, nicknamed graeculus for his strong support for Greek culture, broke with the prior Roman tradition of being clean-shaven to imitate the Greek fashion of wearing a beard and portraying himself in a himation or pallium instead of the usual Roman toga, Romans received his behaviour positively. The Emperor Hadrian helped revive a sense of historical Greek identity with his foundation of the Panhellenion in AD 131, a league of cities originating from cities of old Greece. This period saw the Greeks forming the peaceful hinterland near major conflict zones, and Greeks had recently suffered severely during the Jewish uprising. The Romans were hence keen to win over Greek support for strategic reasons. Antoninus Pius followed the policy adopted by Hadrian of ingratiating himself with Greek-speaking city elites, especially with local intellectuals who were explicitly exempted from any duties involving private spending for civic purposes, a privilege granted by Hadrian that Antoninus confirmed.

The Severan dynasty modelled their Greek policy on Hadrian's example, especially Severus Alexander, who became particularly connected to Athens through Athenian citizenship and membership in the tribe Adrianis. Latin became the prestige language while Greek was used to support communication. For instance, Septimius Severus was described as learned in both Latin and Greek, and when he spoke Latin to the Egyptian masses, interpreters translated into Greek. A court trial that Caracalla presided over was recorded in Latin, except for the words of the emperor and the lawyers, which were in Greek. Caracalla was also attested as an obsessive 'fan' of Alexander the Great; he emotionally and religiously venerated Alexander when visiting his tomb, drank from goblets said to belong to Alexander, carried a shield with Alexander's image, and ordered artworks of Alexander.

The same philhellenic tendency continued in Emperor Gallienus, who was Archon of Athens and initiated in the Eleusinian Mysteries. However, this period of Roman history, the Crisis of the Third Century, saw recurrent civil wars and widespread raids from barbarian tribes, including in Greece. In 268 the Heruli captured and severely damaged Athens before being repulsed by Gallienus. The heavy expenditure in dealing with these emergencies led to the emperors debasing the currency and issuing more coinage to pay for fiscal demands, which crippled the elites of the Greek cities, the bouleutai "councilors", who relied on monetary revenues to perform their administrative duties. The Roman correctores (governors) of Achaea proceeded to eliminate the autonomy of the Greek cities, to further intensify revenue collection for the imperial treasury.

In addition, Diocletian's establishment of the permanent imperial court in the Greek East increased the circulation of Latin in the East, and Latinization of the imperial administration under Diocletian and the Tetrarchy made Latin proficiency more critical for social progression. Equally fluent in Latin and Greek, Diocletian's original Greek name Diocles (lit. Zeus' Glory, which implies that he had been commended at birth to Zeus) suggests a Greek origin — no prior emperor had Hellenic origins — and he resumed using his original name after abdication. Both Diocletian and his co-emperor Galerius chose Greek cities (Nicomedia and Thessalonica respectively) as their nascent capitals, viewing Greece as the political heartland of their empire. Their devotion to traditional Greek religion motivated the Diocletianic persecution against Christianity, after Diocletian consulted his officials and an oracle of Apollo. Meanwhile, the Western co-emperors did not fully implement the persecution.

== Late antiquity ==
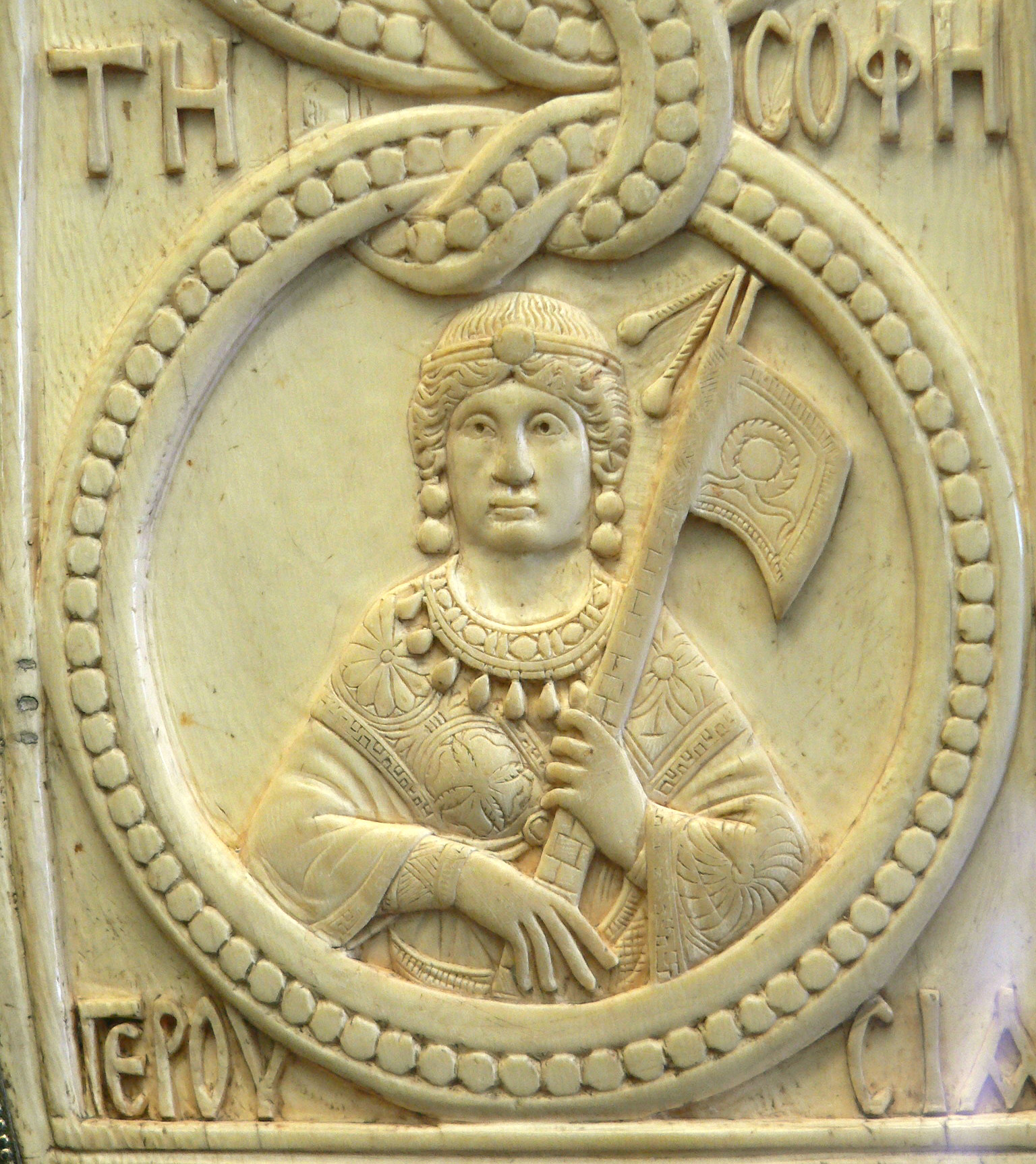
Personification of the senate (in Constantinople), from the consular diptych of Theodore Philoxenus, 525 AD

=== Declining relations in the 4th and 5th centuries ===
By late antiquity, the division of the two parts of the Roman Empire began to accelerate between the weakened and disorderly Latin West and the more prosperous Greek East. Outdated visions of late antiquity as a period of poverty, depopulation, barbarian destruction, and civil decay have been revised in light of recent archaeological discoveries, and it is assumed that between the 4th and 7th centuries AD, Greece continued as one of the most economically active regions in the eastern Mediterranean. New strategies of production introduced during the 3rd century administrative reorganisation of Achaea led to a period of economic resurgence for Greece in the 4th and 5th centuries.

With the increasing Christianization of the Greek East in the 4th century, Greeks increasingly avoided referring to themselves as "Hellenes" — the name that they previously used to identify themselves but had become associated with pagan religion — preferring to identify simply as "Romans". In the 4th century, Rome was still regarded as the cosmopolis, the global center that culturally reflected the entire world which it ruled. However, as Rome became increasingly vulnerable in the 5th century, veneration for the physical Rome was replaced by a spiritual, portable concept of Rome that was not fixed to any location.

An uncomfortable coexistence emerged when Constantius II established a Senate and a Praefectus Urbi for Constantinople, in imitation of Rome, which upset the elites of Rome by threatening the privileges that Rome had once enjoyed exclusively. The religious competition that arose between the churches of Rome and Constantinople also contributed to the political conflict between the cities. In addition, the absence of the emperors from Rome encouraged Rome's inhabitants to defend the interests of their city, assert Rome's uniqueness as the cradle of the empire, and pass judgement on the 'Romanness' of the rest of the Empire.

In the West, the ancient negative stereotypes of Greeks contributed to disdain for the Greek-speaking Eastern Romans. Emperor Julian, who considered himself culturally Greek and praised Hellenization as the foundation of the Roman Empire, found himself mocked as a Graeculus and a pretentious fraud by Roman troops from the Western provinces. Julian was also noted as being obsessed with Alexander the Great. Greeks dominated the economic life of Rome, a dependence which caused tension with the Romans; in 440 the Western emperor Valentinian III decided to expel "all the Greek merchants" from the city. This move caused a famine which forced Valentinian to withdraw the edict. Although some leaders in the Western Empire called upon Eastern assistance during the decline of the West, not all Westerners welcomed this interference. Praetorian prefect of Gaul Arvandus labelled the emperor Anthemius as a "Greek emperor", seeing him as an alien intruder and urging the Visigoths to remove him from power. In the late 5th century, the Gallo-Roman bishop Avitus of Vienne denounced Emperor Anastasius I as Caesar Graecorum ("Emperor of the Greeks"), and called the Eastern Empire Grecia, in response to the adoption of Monophysitism, a heresy to the West.

=== Language ===
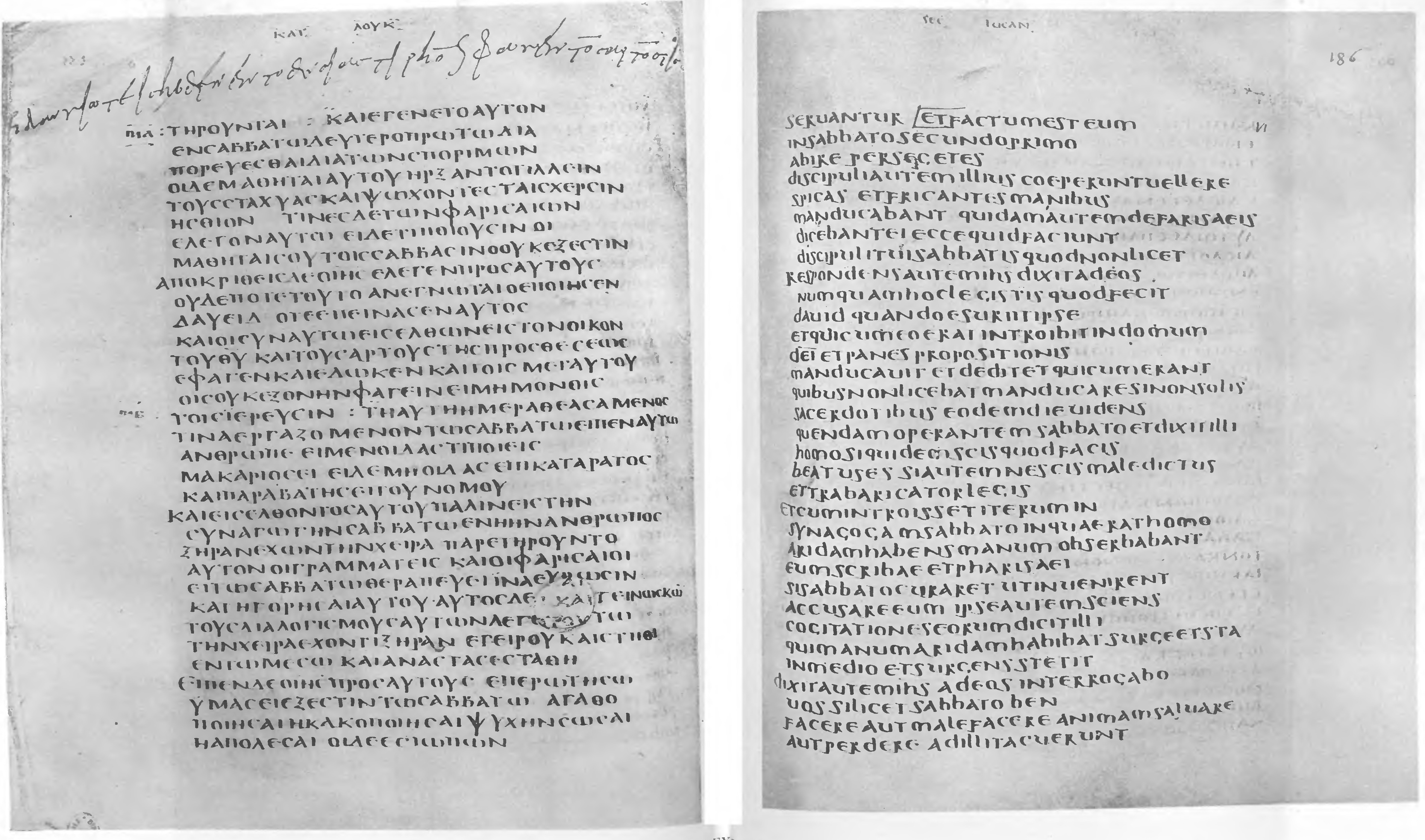
A sample of the bilingual Greek-Latin text from the Codex Bezae, 6th century AD

The prestige and influence of Latin vis-a-vis Greek in the East rose to its highest in the 4th century. Latin loanwords also appear liberally in Greek texts on technical topics from late antiquity and the Byzantine period. Constantine was bilingual in Greek and Latin but was more fluent in Latin. For example, he was able to carry conversations in Greek without an interpreter, but preferred Latin for speeches and written statements, such as when addressing the Greek-speaking bishops in the First Council of Nicaea. Julian was also bilingual but was more fluent in Greek, having an "adequate" ability in Latin according to Ammianus Marcellinus, but "better read" in Greek according to Eutropius. Both Greek and Latin were still in active use by government officials and the Church during the 5th century. Later, from the 6th century, Greek culture was studied in the West almost exclusively through Latin translation. Although Latin was historically important in the military, legal system, and government, its use also declined in Eastern territories from 400 AD. Greek had begun to replace it even in those functions by the time of Justinian I (r. 527–565), who may have tried to arrest Latin's decline. Its extinction in the east was thereafter inevitable. Writing in the reign of Justinian, John Lydus recounted an incident in the 5th century when a certain Cyrus, Prefect of Constantinople, recited edicts in Greek instead of Latin. Lydus believed that this event fulfilled an ancient prophecy which predicted the downfall of Rome "when they forgot their ancestral tongue." The Eastern empire lost its linguistic diversity in the wars of the 7th and 8th centuries, becoming overwhelmingly Greek-speaking. In the East, Greek speakers saw themselves as the true Romans since Greek became identified as the "Roman" language (Rhōmaikē).

=== Justinian's reconquest and aftermath ===
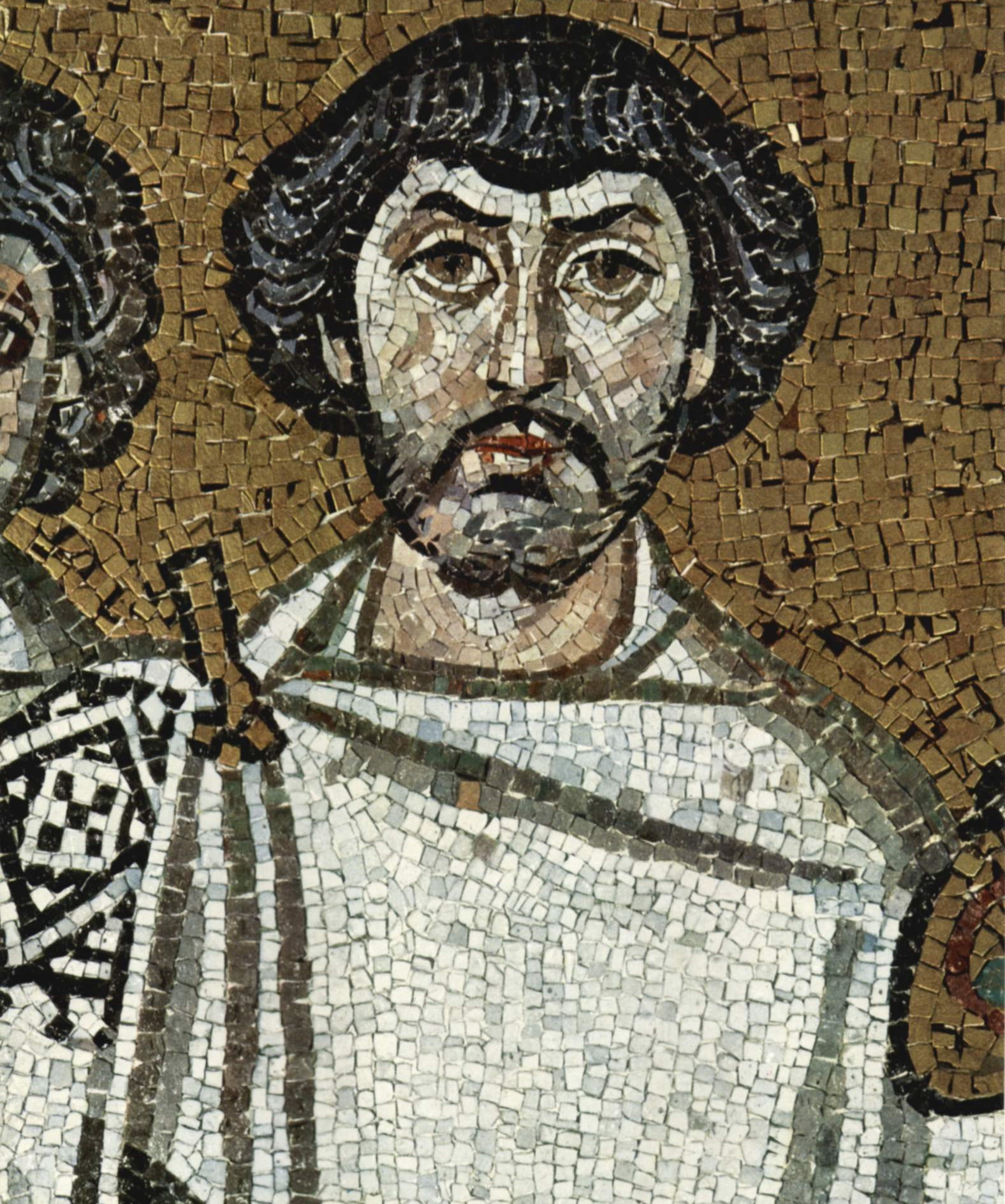
Belisarius mosaic, Basilica of San Vitale, Ravenna, Italy

After recapturing Rome and parts of Italy, the violent Gothic wars and the various sieges throughout Italy further disillusioned the native Roman population, worsening the reputation of Greeks such as Belisarius and his troops, who were mostly Greek or Greek speaking. When Belisarius arrived in Italy, the Goths began to propagate anti-Greek sentiment, stereotyping the Greeks that were in Rome as useless mimes and thieves. The sentiment successfully spread due to the resentment already borne between the Romans and Greeks. At the climax of the tension and violence the Romans wrote a letter to the Emperor Justinian in which they proclaimed that they would rather be ruled by Goths than by Greeks; the Roman resentment against the Greeks was not limited only to the troops of Belisarius, but to all Hellenic influence. While the Goths denounced the Eastern Romans as "Greeks", the Easterners insisted that all Romans owed their allegiance to their fellow Romans from the East, an ideological position which did not account for Italy's flexible identities and frequent defections. Hence, their labelling of individuals as "Goth" or "Roman" shifted fluidly depending on which party these persons supported at each moment. Belisarius, noting the growing distrust of the Romans, wrote a letter to Emperor Justinian I over his concerns about the intentions of the Romans: "And although at the present time the Romans are well disposed toward us, yet when their troubles are prolonged, they will probably not hesitate to choose the course which is better for their own interests. [...] Furthermore, the Romans will be compelled by hunger to do many things they would prefer not to do."

To reestablish order Justinian and Belisarius began to replace the native Roman popes and high functionaries or nobles who often conspired against the Byzantine troops in Rome or Italy, with Greek speakers from Syria, Antioch, Alexandria and Cilicia. This policy of "Hellenization" in the Italian peninsula and in the newly reconquered western provinces of the empire, each with a Byzantine exarch, was closely followed by Justinian and his successors. The Ravenna exarchate, and the following Catepanate of Italy, were responsible for the strong and continued Hellenic-Eastern influence on Italy. The Eastern Empire arranged for Italian aristocrats to live semi-permanently as second-class nobles in Constantinople, generating considerable resentment. The Greek merchant enclave in Rome, the ripa graeca, became the center of Byzantine period Rome. The widespread destruction of Italy in the war, harsh Gothic and Imperial reprisals of their opponents' supporters, and heavy Imperial taxation led the Italian populace to shift allegiances: instead of loyalty to the Roman Empire, their identities were increasingly tied to religion, family and city instead.

In the 7th century, it had become common practice in the Latin West to refer to the Eastern remnants of the Roman Empire as Graeci "Greeks". After the dissolution of the Western Empire, there was no remaining trace of a unified Italian Roman identity, Latin speakers in the former Western provinces were no longer considered as Romans, and the Latin West used the term Romani to refer to inhabitants of the Eastern Empire (alongside the term "Greek" which served to convey a sense of distancing). In the 5th and 6th centuries, Romani still generally referred to all citizens of the Roman Empire. In the 6th century, there was a shift in meaning of "Roman" to refer briefly to Italians, and later, to inhabitants of the city of Rome. By the earlier 8th century, Western texts started to distinguish between "Romans" and "Greeks" as separate peoples.

From the late 7th century, imperial policy of self-reliance in Italy led to the rise of a local aristocracy in the military and administration, drawn from landholders who leased lands from the Church, and who dominated papal elections. Meanwhile, aggressive imperial promotion of Monophysitism, Monothelitism and Iconoclasm alienated these aristocrats and strained Italian loyalty to the Empire. With the fading Imperial military presence in Italy, the Papacy filled the role of leading resistance to the Lombard invaders. The popes began to claim the Duchy of Rome (and later, Ravenna as well) as a separate "Republic of the Romans" or "holy republic", eventually placing themselves under the protection of the Carolingian Franks, whom the popes granted the title "Patrician of the Romans". In subsequent periods, Constantinople's subjects from Italy no longer referred to themselves as Romans. Nevertheless, elites of the Eastern Empire continued to promote loyalty to the state of Constantinople and its emperor as the basis of imperial identity, rather than an ethnic concept of Romanness based on Greek language or Orthodox Christianity (which only occurred in the 12th century).

== See also ==
- Greek East and Latin West

== Sources ==
- Ursin, Frank (2019). Freiheit, Herrschaft, Widerstand. Griechische Erinnerungskultur in der Hohen Kaiserzeit (1.-3. Jahrhundert n. Chr.) [Freedom, rule, resistance. The Greek culture of remembrance in the High Imperial Period (1st-3rd century AD)]. Stuttgart: Steiner. ISBN 978-3-515-12163-7.
