= Amykles =

Amykles Αμύκλες
- Community
- Location within Greece
- Coordinates: 37°2′N 22°26′E
- Country: Greece
- Administrative region: Peloponnese
- Regional unit: Laconia
- Municipality: Sparti
- Municipal unit: Sparti

Population (2021)
  - Community: 831
- Time zone: UTC+2 (EET)
  - Summer (DST): UTC+3 (EEST)
- Vehicle registration: AK

Amykles (Greek: Αμύκλες) is a village in Laconia, southern Greece. It lies in the plain by the Eurotas river, 6 km south of Sparta, east of the Taygetus mountains, along the Greek National Road 39 from Sparta to Gytheio. It was named after the ancient town Amyclae, the ruins of which are situated 2 km northeast of the village.

== Population ==
Year	Village population	Community population
1981	-	1,164
1991	589	871
2001	735	1,009
2011	694	1,000
2021	586	831

== Ancient Amyclae ==
According to some sources, the ancient town Amyclae (Ancient Greek: Ἀμύκλαι - Amyklai) was founded by Amyclas of Sparta, the son of Lacedaemon. In the second century AD, the traveller Pausanias was informed that the archaic site of Amyklai had its ancient origin as an Achaean stronghold that predated the "Dorian invasion", and modern archaeology has supported that view. The Bronze Age settlement lay on the slopes above the modern village of Amykles. It was conquered by the Spartans as the fifth of the surrounding settlements whose subjection initiated the history of Sparta, in the eighth century BC; the inhabitants of Amyklai took their places among the perioikoi, members of autonomous groups of free but non-citizen inhabitants of Sparta.

About the same time, there was erected at Amyklai the Sanctuary of Apollo, enclosing within its temenos the tumulus of Hyakinthos, a pre-Hellene divinity whose cult was conflated with that of Apollo, in the annual festival of the Hyakinthia. There have been finds of sub-Mycenaean votive figures and of votive figures from the Geometric period, but with a gap in continuity between them: "it is clear that a radical reinterpretation has taken place" Walter Burkert has observed, instancing many examples of this break in cult during the "Greek Dark Ages", including Amyklai (1985, p 49).

After the Spartan conquest, Amyklai continued to hold the Gymnopaideia and the Hyakinthia, now celebrated in honor of Apollo Amyklaios, given an even later political interpretation, as celebrating "the political reconciliation of Doric Sparta (Apollo) with the Achaian population of Amyklai (Hyakinthos)" (Hellenic Ministry of Culture). Nothing is heard yet of Apollo's sister Artemis at Amyklai, Burkert has pointed out. In the seventh or early sixth century, a colossal archaic helmeted effigy was made of bronze, taking the semi-aniconic form of a stout column with arms, holding a spear as well as the more familiar bow: "ancient and made without artistry," Pausanias thought. "Except for the face and the tips of its feet and hands it looks like a bronze pillar. It has a helmet on its head, and a spear and a bow in its hands. The base of the statue is shaped like an altar, and Hyakinthos is said to be buried in it." (Description, III.6). In the mid-sixth century the face of Apollo had been veneered with gold from Lydia, the gift of Croesus. Later in the sixth century, Bathycles of Magnesia designed the Doric-Ionic temple complex later known as the "throne of Apollo". The archaic cult statue, set on the podium that was constructed to enclose the chthonic altar dedicated to Hyakinthos, was surrounded by a virtual encyclopedia of Greek mythology, to judge from Pausanias' enumeration of the subjects of the reliefs. The podium contained the altar to Hyakinthos and was faced with bas-reliefs and there were more bas-reliefs on the stoa-like building that surrounded on three sides the colossal column-shaped statue of the god. The analemma and peribolos of the sanctuary have been excavated. Architectural fragments show that the architecture combined Doric and Ionic architectural orders: some are exhibited in the Sparta Museum.

Beside the cult of Apollo, the people of Amyklai also worshipped Dionysus, as Dionysos Psilax. Pausanias noted that psila was Doric for wings— "wine uplifts men and lightens their spirit no less than wings do birds" he added by way of gloss: apparently it was hard for him to imagine an archaic winged Dionysus.

Traditionally Amyklai was associated the residence of Tyndareus and his sons, the Dioscures.

== Medieval history ==
Amyclae became a bishopric in 1082, see Diocese of Amyclae.

== See also ==
- List of settlements in Laconia
