= Aenetus of Amyclae =

Olympic pentathlon victor

Ainētos (Ancient Greek: Αἴνητος) was an ancient Greek Olympic champion hailing from the city of Amyklai in Laconia. He lived during an unknown pre-Christian era. According to Pausanias, Ainētos emerged victorious in the pentathlon competition, but while he was being crowned as the winner, he fell dead. His statue existed in his hometown of Amyklai, where Pausanias saw it.

== Sources ==
- Johannes Kirchner: «Ainetos 3», Paulys Realencyclopädie der classischen Altertumswissenschaft, Volume I,1, Stuttgart 1894, p. 1024
