= Sanctuary of Artemis Orthia =

Sanctuary at Sparta

Coordinates: 37.083°N 22.435°E

The Sanctuary of Artemis Orthia (white star) near Sparta in the Peloponnesus

The Sanctuary of Artemis Orthia, an Archaic site devoted in Classical times to Artemis, was one of the most important religious sites in the Greek city-state of Sparta, and continued to be used into the fourth century CE, when all non-Christian worship was banned during the persecution of pagans in the late Roman Empire. The sanctuary was destroyed and rebuilt a few times over many centuries and has today produced many artefacts that allow historians to better understand exactly what went on in the sanctuary during that period of time. This sanctuary held many rituals, that included cult-like behaviour by both young boys and girls in varying ways and has also since revealed many artefacts due to multiple excavations that have helped to deliver new information on acts and behaviours that have occurred in at the temple in Orthia.

== Sanctuary ==
The cult of Orthia (Greek Ὀρθία) was common to the four villages originally constituting Sparta: Limnae (in which it is situated), Pitane, Cynosura, and Mesoa. Chronologically speaking, historians believe that it likely came after the cult to the city-goddess Athena Πολιοῦχος (Polioũkhos) "protectress of the city" or Χαλκίοικος / Khalkíoikos "of the bronze house".

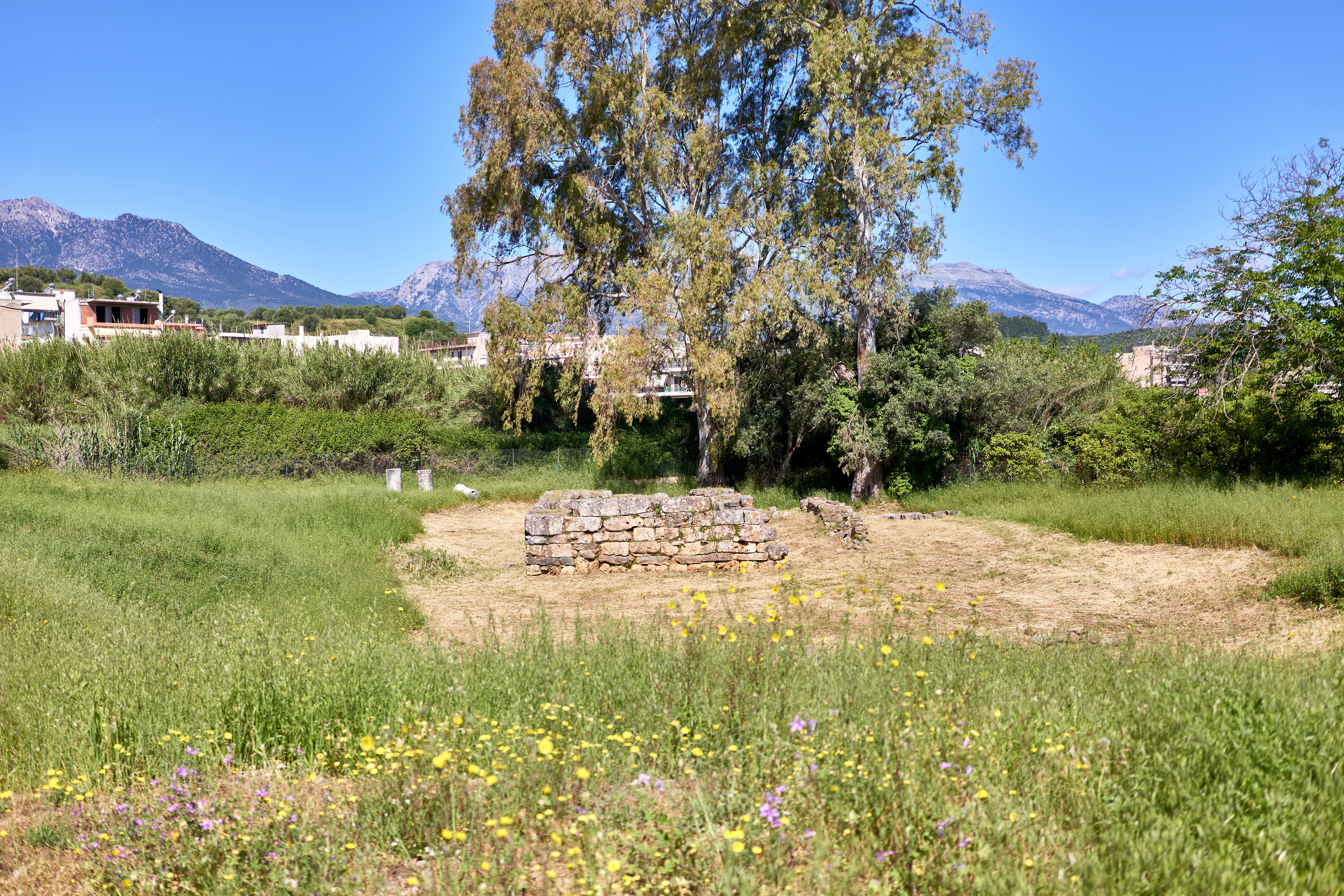
The remains of the Temple of Artemis Orthia in Sparta

The sanctuary is located in Peloponnese, on the south bank of the Eurotas River, at ancient Sparta. This location was above the reach of all but the severest flooding which began near the start of and continued on into the 6th century BCE. After the flood caused extensive damage to the site, it was then lifted beyond the reach of the water using sand that formed a blanket-like cover, isolating artefacts existing beneath. The original sanctuary was believed to be built in ca. 700 BCE. The oldest relics, pottery fragments from the late Greek Dark Ages, indicate that the cult has probably existed since the 10th century BCE, but not before (Rose in Dawkins 1929:399).

A second temple was built around 570 BCE, perhaps during the joint reign of Leon of Sparta and Agasicles, when military successes provided funds; however, it was moved towards the north, built atop portions of the old temple and is now facing S/E. The terrain was raised and consolidated, undoubtedly following erosion caused by the Eurotas. An altar and a temple of limestone, oriented the same way as the previous buildings, were built on a bed of river sand. The surrounding wall was also enlarged, and at this stage took on a rectangular form. The second temple was entirely rebuilt in the 2nd century BCE, during the Hellenistic age, except for the altar. The second temple was utilized only for a bit up until the 4th century when it was then thought to be forgotten about. Just before the site was abandoned in the 3rd century CE, the Romans built a theatre around the temple and altar, introducing a new altar in order to welcome visitors to the diamastigosis.

== Cult ==
=== Cult elements ===
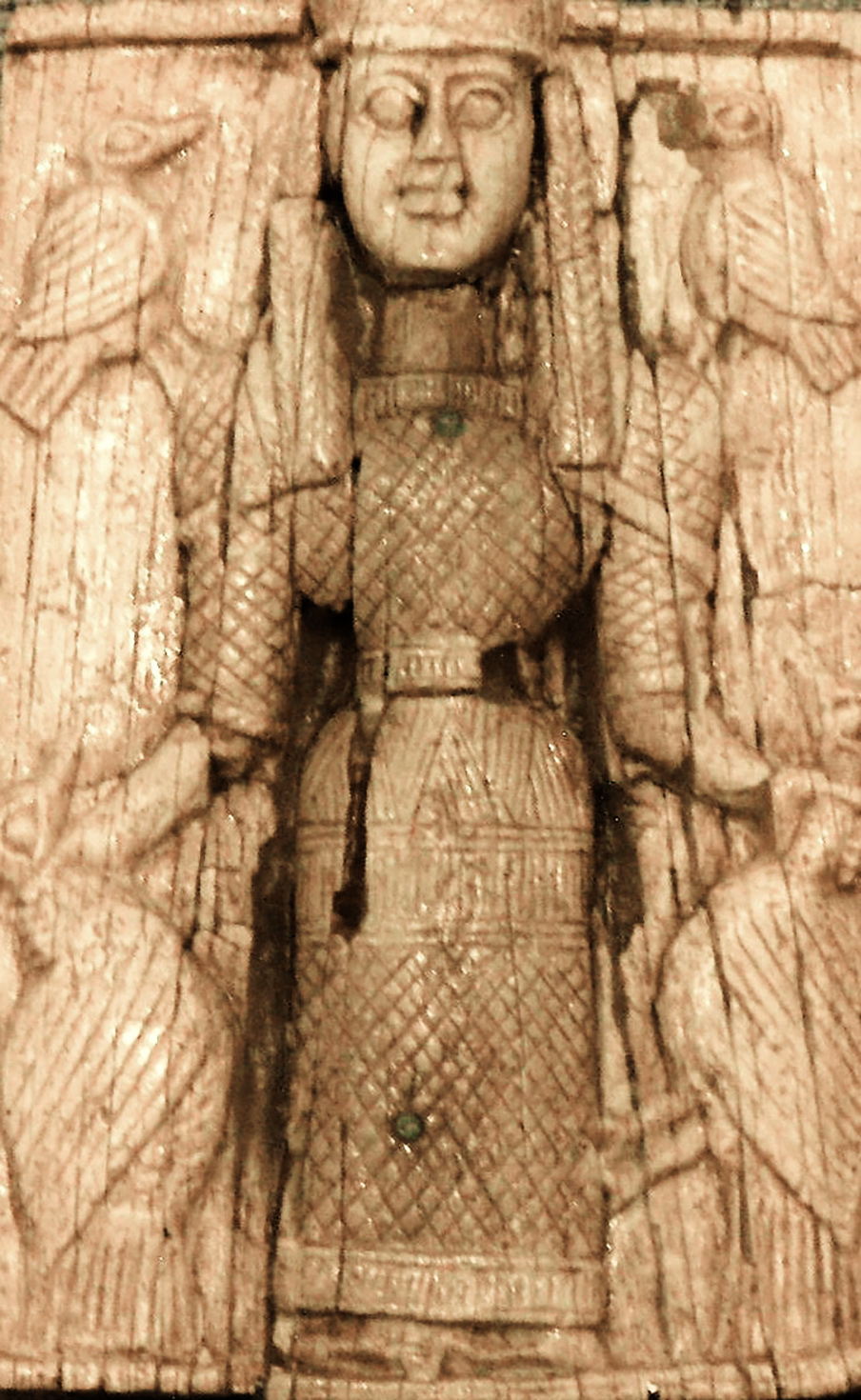
Archaic (pre-Classical) representation of the goddess on an ivory votive offering (National Archaeological Museum of Athens) may reflect the cult image.

Many kinds of celebrations were conducted at the temple, one of the original being the Procession of the Girls. It was thought that this celebration occurred when the temple opened at the very beginning. All of the details are not known as to what exactly occurred during this celebration, however, it was thought that the girls of Sparta brought gifts to offer Artemis while they sang songs to the Parthenos. Many inscriptions were found in relation to this celebration, ensuring the seriousness taken when worshipping the goddess.

The Cult at Sparta was often found to use masks that imitated the appearance of various animals. This was because during a special feast named the Syracusan feast of Artemis, there could be a surrounding of creatures circling Artemis, it was of importance that one would be a female lion. In connection with this, offerings at the temple usually including those of animals, at Sparta, the bear was seen as a significant symbol. It was suggested that Artemis Orthia and the bear were linked in ways that relate to mothering and the birthing of children.

Because Artemis is related to the ideas of nature and nourishment, she is also thought to be fruitful. Many myths portray her as a figure that has a society of nymphs serving her as royalty along with satyrs that come from Dionysos, therefore, causing females at a young age to become very honourable towards the cult. Young females seen honouring the cult were considered to be celibate. The statue representing Artemis for the cult was removed out of the sanctuary temporarily by the girls while their dance was performed.

Men also gave praise to the Greek goddess, because of such the ephebes could be seen being beaten with objects such as whips at the altar of the temple in Sparta. There were three types of games thought to be played in the sanctuary by young boys. The first and even the second game were thought to be a battle of singing or who could create the best music while the last game was thought to be a hunting game as it required ten youths in order to play. One game was not known as the writing that explained it could not be properly deciphered at the time of discovery. The cult addressed a xoanon (archaic wooden effigy) of malevolent reputation, for it was reputedly from Tauride, whence it was stolen by Orestes and Iphigenia, according to Euripides. Orientalizing carved ivory images found at the site show the winged goddess grasping an animal or bird in either hand in the manner of the Potnia Theron; half-finished ivories from the site show that their facture was local (Rose in Dawkins 1929:400).

Pausanias describes the subsequent origin of the diamastigosis (ritual flagellation):

I will give other evidence that the Orthia in Lacedaemon is the wooden image from the foreigners. Firstly, Astrabacus and Alopecus, sons of Irbus, son of Amphisthenes, son of Amphicles, son of Agis, when they found the image straightway became insane. Secondly, the Spartan Limnatians, the Cynosurians, and the people of Mesoa and Pitane, while sacrificing to Artemis, fell to quarrelling, which led also to bloodshed; many were killed at the altar and the rest died of disease. Whereat an oracle was delivered to them, that they should stain the altar with human blood. He used to be sacrificed upon whomsoever the lot fell, but Lycurgus changed the custom to a scourging of the ephebos, and so in this way the altar is stained with human blood. By them stands the priestess, holding the wooden image. Now it is small and light, but if ever the scourgers spare the lash because of a lad's beauty or high rank, then at once the priestess finds the image grow so heavy that she can hardly carry it. She lays the blame on the scourgers, and says that it is their fault that she is being weighed down. So the image ever since the sacrifices in the Tauric land keeps its fondness for human blood. They call it not only Orthia, but also Lygodesma (Λυγοδέσμα - Willow-bound), because it was found in a thicket of willows, and the encircling willow made the image stand upright." (Description of Greece III, 16, 9–11)

In addition to diamastigosis (ritual flagellation), the cult entailed individual dances by young men and dances by choruses of girls. For the young men, the prize is a sickle, which implies an agricultural ritual.

The presence of ex-votos (votive offerings) attests to the popularity of the cult: clay masks representing old women or hoplites as well as lead and terracotta figurines showing men and women playing the flute, lyre, or cymbals, or mounting a horse.

== Winged Artemis ==
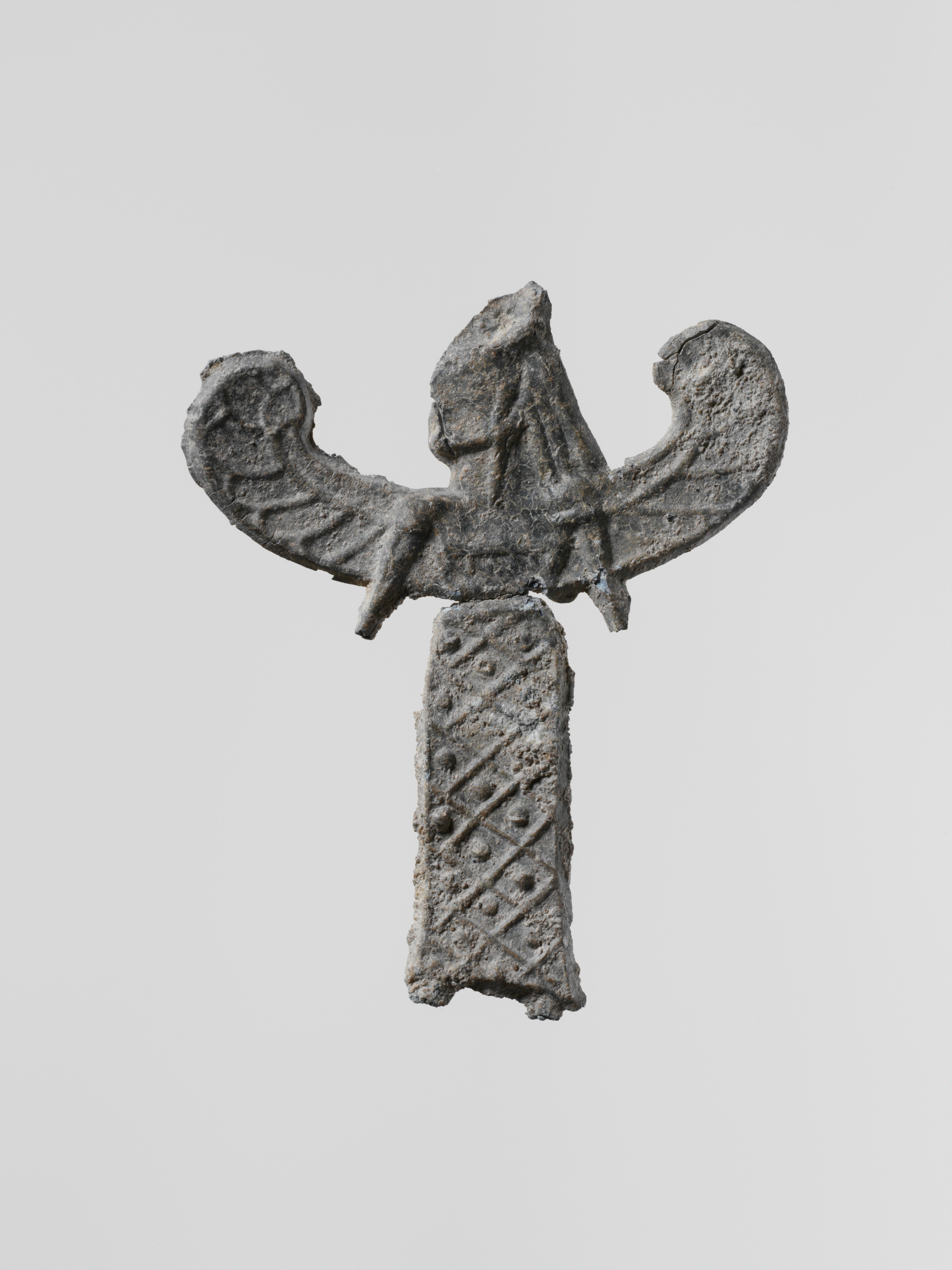
Lead figure of a winged goddess, possibly Artemis Orthia, Metropolitan Museum of Art

The archaic winged Artemis, represented in many ex-votos from the 8th century to the later sixth, lingered longest here as Artemis Orthia. The doll-like figures of the goddess Artemis are consistently exhibited wearing a set of wings rather than placing an animal in her hands or by her side. Many differences can be observed from one figurine to the next, with the most important being in how the wings are designed as well as the "polos", however, neither holds any relevance. The body of the figurine slowly declined in detail over time, specifically in the structure of the wings, followed by a disappearance of the head, stick-like feet and a new triangle-shaped frame. Some of the figures that were created around 600 BCE were sometimes found to have messages devoted to Artemis Orthia inscribed in the piece being offered.

=== Diamastigosis ===
The cult of Orthia gave rise to διαμαστίγωσις / diamastigosis (from διαμαστιγῶ / diamastigô, "to whip harshly"), where the éphēboi were flogged, as described by Plutarch, Xenophon, Pausanias, and Plato. Cheeses were piled on the altar and guarded by adults with whips. The young men would attempt to get them, braving the whips. This was done as a way to prepare boys at a young age for the life they will face as an adult and as a soldier. It was deemed as a rite of passage.

During the Roman period, according to Cicero, the ritual became a blood spectacle, sometimes to the death, with spectators from all over the empire. An amphitheatre had to be built in the 3rd century CE to accommodate the visitors. Libanios indicates that the spectacle was attracting the curious as late as the 4th century CE.

== Votive offerings ==
Votive offerings found in the Sanctuary of Artemis Orthia were most often small but presented in large abundances. During the Archaic timeline, these offerings came in many variations and forms, leading to the assumption that the items were not specifically chosen as something that would pertain to or be associated with the god/goddess being praised. Instead, the offerings were thought to be selected from a more personal standpoint rather than something more representative of the honoured one. The idea of generosity was more important than the item itself that was being given and the connection it may have had to the god/goddess.

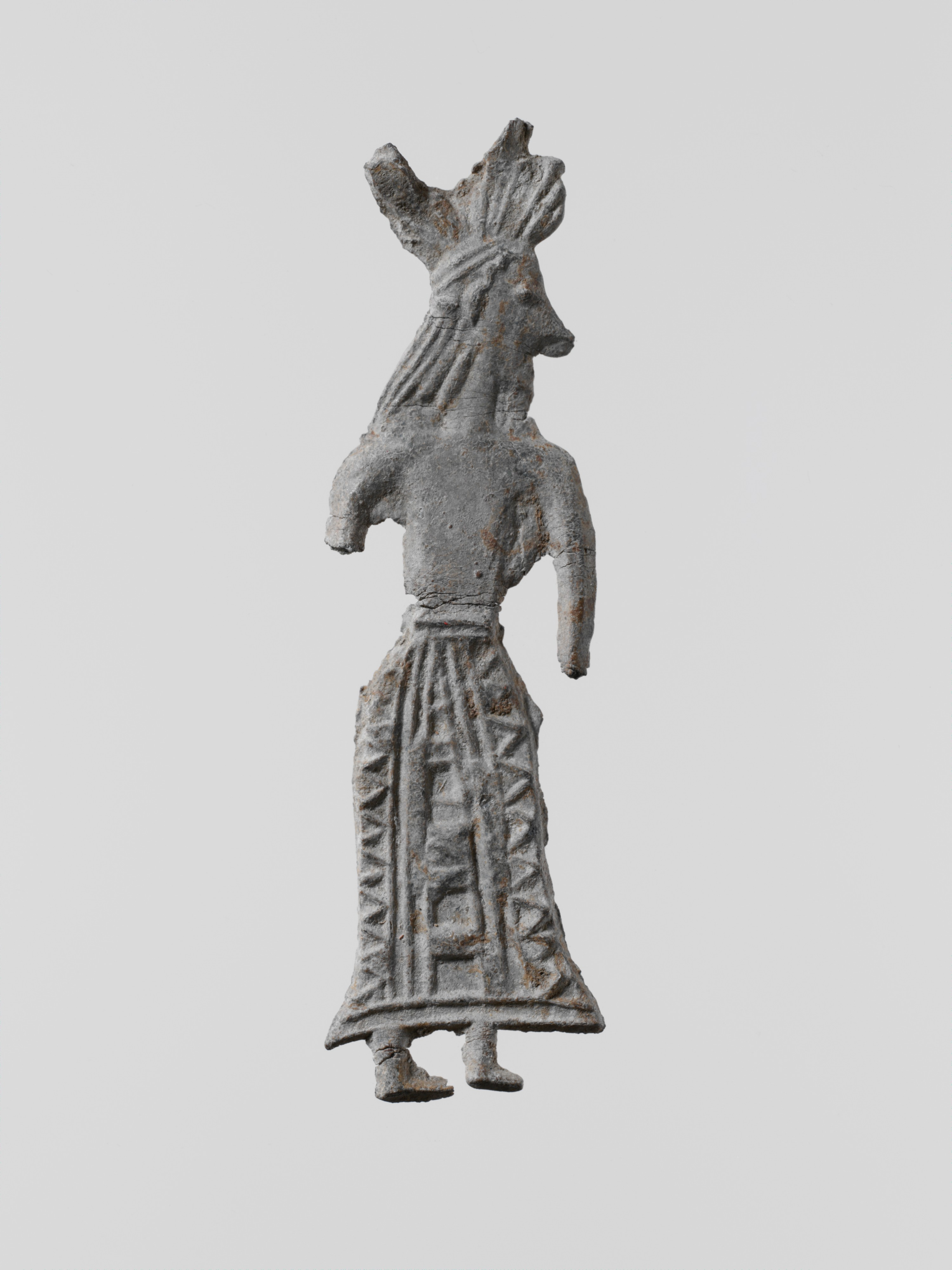
Lead figure of a woman with wreath

Sanctuaries located in Laconia were often found to make offerings that were made from lead and formed into many shapes, the most common being the shape of a wreath. Many of these wreaths could often be found linked together by the left over lead still connected to the used equipment. Lead offerings make-up over 100,000 of the lead offerings (now stationed in the Liverpool collections) that were discovered during professional digs at the Sanctuary of Artemis Orthia. The dramatic decrease in the numbers of votives recovered from strata after c. 500 BC is coincident with the change in application of lead ores at Laurion in Attica, the probable source for these figurines, from lead to silver.

The most popular figurines discovered in the Sanctuary consisted of warriors, female characters, Olympian deities, musicians and dancers. In relation to the representation of animals, deer were commonly found to be offered and were recognized as a replacement votive that directly related to hunting and preying.

Tiny sized vases, another type of votive offering, first made an appearance in The Sanctuary of Artemis Orthia at the very start of the Archaic timeline. Many of the tiny vases that were found were hand crafted while others were created using a wheel and had handles attached to the side. Most often, the tiny vases were not glossed over, but the occasional time they could be found glossed over in black.

Offerings made of terracotta were also found to be used in the sanctuary and were usually self-crafted or moulded into various shapes and sizes. One of the most unique terracotta votives discovered in the Sanctuary of Artemis at Orthia were masks that were seemingly created to mimic the human appearance. These mask votives were thought to perfectly fit the face structure of a human, however, some masks that were discovered appeared to be smaller in size.

== Excavation of the site ==
The site was brought to light by the British School at Athens during their digs in Laconia (1906–10), after doll like figures and other tiny items were discovered in the ground around the river, under the site. At the time, the unexcavated site appeared to consist only of a ruined Roman theatre, largely pillaged after the foundation of modern Sparta in 1834, and about to collapse into the river. The archaeologists, under the leadership of R. M. Dawkins, quickly found evidence of Greek occupation. Dawkins writes, "The Roman theatre was easy to protect...a large quantity of ancient objects which by the light they shed on primitive Sparta, have given this dig capital significance." A long, continuous sequence of archaeological strata was revealed. Two distinct areas were marked and used to excavate the site entirely, they were labeled as trench A and trench B. Trench A covered the southern area of the sanctuary, running through the amphitheatre, trench B was marked only 10 meters from trench A still on the south, covering all parts of the infrastructure.

Trench A delivered many artefacts, likely thought to be items sacrificed to the goddess, deep within the soil below the amphitheatre. The most incredible discovery made from trench A was the abundance of masks, believed to be related to the cult. Trench B was dug too far away from the main site, based on the minimal findings within. Artifacts found within the trenches included ceramics, geometrically styled vessels, doll like figures, sculptures and more.

A sign of human life at its earliest is noted within the darkest of dirt filled with many artifacts that lie directly beneath the altar of the temple. The piles of artefacts could be found nowhere else at the site in such abundances other than the spot in which it was believed the goddess was being worshipped. The remnants found, including bones, were thought to be related to the cult and were discovered to be the remains of animals that were offered by fire to Orthia.

As well as the British Museum, a significant group of offerings were placed in the World Museum of Liverpool, United Kingdom, and are said to exhibit pieces that come from all time periods that the temple was utilized (the 8th century BCE to the 3rd century CE). Although there is information to suggest that the sanctuary was utilized long after the 8th century, most of the discovered votives were buried into the ground far before the mid 7th century. The votives can be dated back late in the 5th century BCE, while the largest amount was found near the end of the 6th century BCE.

== See also ==
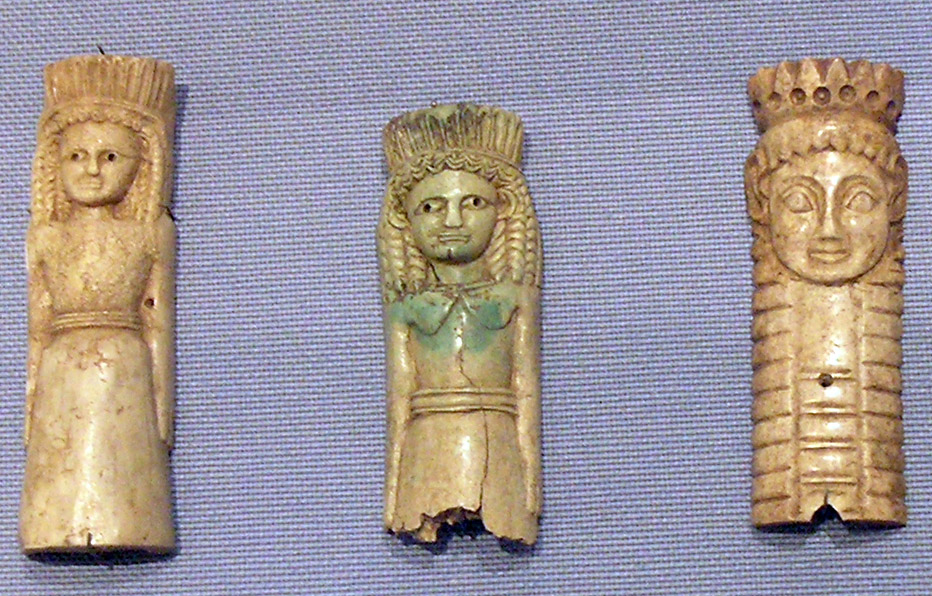
Ivory busts of the goddess; votive offerings, National Archaeological Museum of Athens

- Spartan naval art: Ivory plaque

Other sanctuaries devoted to Artemis:

- Temple of Artemis, the Artemision at Ephesus
- Brauron in Attica, where Artemis was venerated in conjunction with Iphigeneia
- National Archaeological Museum of Athens

Other Spartan festivals:

- Carneian festival
- Hyacinthia
- Gymnopaedia

== Bibliography ==
- Thompson M.S, "The Asiatic or Winged Artemis." The Journal of Hellenic Studies, 29(1) (1909), pp. 286–307
- Woodward, Arthur Maurice (1910). The Sanctuary of Artemis Orthia at Sparta: Inscriptions.
- Dawkins, R.M, The Sanctuary of Artemis Orthia at Sparta, Journal of Hellenic Studies, supplement no. 5, London, 1929 (Online text)
- Dawkins, R. M. (1930). "Artemis Orthia: Some Additions and a Correction". The Journal of Hellenic Studies. 50 (2): 298–299. doi:10.1017/S0075426900071342. ISSN 0075-4269. JSTOR 626818. S2CID 163268019.
- Boardman, John (1963). "Artemis Orthia and Chronology". The Annual of the British School at Athens. 58: 1–7. doi:10.1017/S0068245400013721. ISSN 0068-2454. JSTOR 30102913. S2CID 162798621.
- Robbins, Emmet. "Heracles, the Hyperboreans, and the Hind: Pindar, "OL." 3", Phoenix 36.4 (1982), pp 295–305.
- Lloyd-Jones Hugh, "Artemis and Iphigneia" The Journal of Hellenic Studies. 103 (1983), pp 87–102.
- Mcphee, Ian (1986). "Laconian Red-Figure from the British Excavations in Sparta". The Annual of the British School at Athens. 81: 153–166. doi:10.1017/S0068245400020128. ISSN 0068-2454. JSTOR 30102895. S2CID 164018692.
- Catling, R. W. V. (1994). "A Fragment of an Archaic Temple Model from Artemis Orthia, Sparta". The Annual of the British School at Athens. 89: 269–275. doi:10.1017/S0068245400015409. ISSN 0068-2454. JSTOR 30102573. S2CID 162662557.
- Chrimes, K. M. T.; Atkinson, Kathleen Mary Tyrer Chrimes (1999). Ancient Sparta: A Re-examination of the Evidence. Manchester University Press. ISBN 978-0-7190-5741-0.
- Stevenson, Jed (2000). Assigning Meaning to the Masks from the Sanctuary of Artemis Orthia, Sparta.
- (in French) Edmond Lévy, Sparte : histoire politique et sociale jusqu'à la conquête romaine, Seuil, "Points Histoire" collection, Paris, 2003 ISBN 2-02-032453-9
- Kopanias, Konstantinos (2009). "Some ivories from the Geometric stratum at the sanctuary of Artemis Orthia, Sparta: interconnections between Sparta, Crete and the Orient during the late eighth century BC". British School at Athens Studies. 16: 123–131. ISSN 2159-4996. JSTOR 40960628.
- Waugh, Nicki (2009). "Visualising fertility at Artemis Orthia's site". British School at Athens Studies. 16: 159–167. ISSN 2159-4996. JSTOR 40960632.
- Fisher-Hansen, Tobias; Poulsen, Birte, From Artemis to Diana: The Goddess of Man and Beast. (2009). Museum Tusculanum Press.
- Boutsakis, E. "Temples, Stars and Ritual Landscapes, The Potential for Archaeoastronomy in Ancient Greece." American Journal of Archaeology, 115(1) (2011), pp. 55.
- Salapata, Gina. "The More The Better? Votive Offerings in Sets." Australasian Society for Classical Studies 32, 2 (Online text)
- Gimatzidis, Stefanos. "Feasting and Offering to the Gods in Early Greek Sanctuaries: Monumentalisation and miniaturisation in Pottery." Pallas Revue d'etudes antiques, 86(1) (2011), pp. 75–96.
- Muskett, Georgina (2014). "Votive Offerings from the Sanctuary of Artemis Orthia, Sparta in Liverpool Collections". The Annual of the British School at Athens. 109: 159–173. doi:10.1017/S0068245414000057. ISSN 0068-2454. JSTOR 44082091. S2CID 193168896.
- Rosenberg, Jonah Lloyd (2015). "The Masks of Orthia: Form, Function and the Origins of Theatre". The Annual of the British School at Athens. 110: 247–261. doi:10.1017/S006824541500009X. ISSN 0068-2454. JSTOR 44082112. S2CID 231656716.
- Kristoffersen, Tore Rovs (2019). "The Artemis Orthia inscriptions and spoken Laconian in the Imperial period: In defence of dialect survival at Sparta". Glotta. 95: 169–189. doi:10.13109/glot.2019.95.1.169. ISSN 0017-1298. JSTOR 26727200. S2CID 166781248.
