= Gymnopedie =

Gymnopedie may refer to:

- Gymnopaedia, a festival or dance in ancient Greece
- Gymnopédies, a series of three compositions by French composer Erik Satie
- Gymnopedies, a series of three compositions by Australian-American composer Peggy Glanville Hicks
