= Spartan ivory plaque with ship =

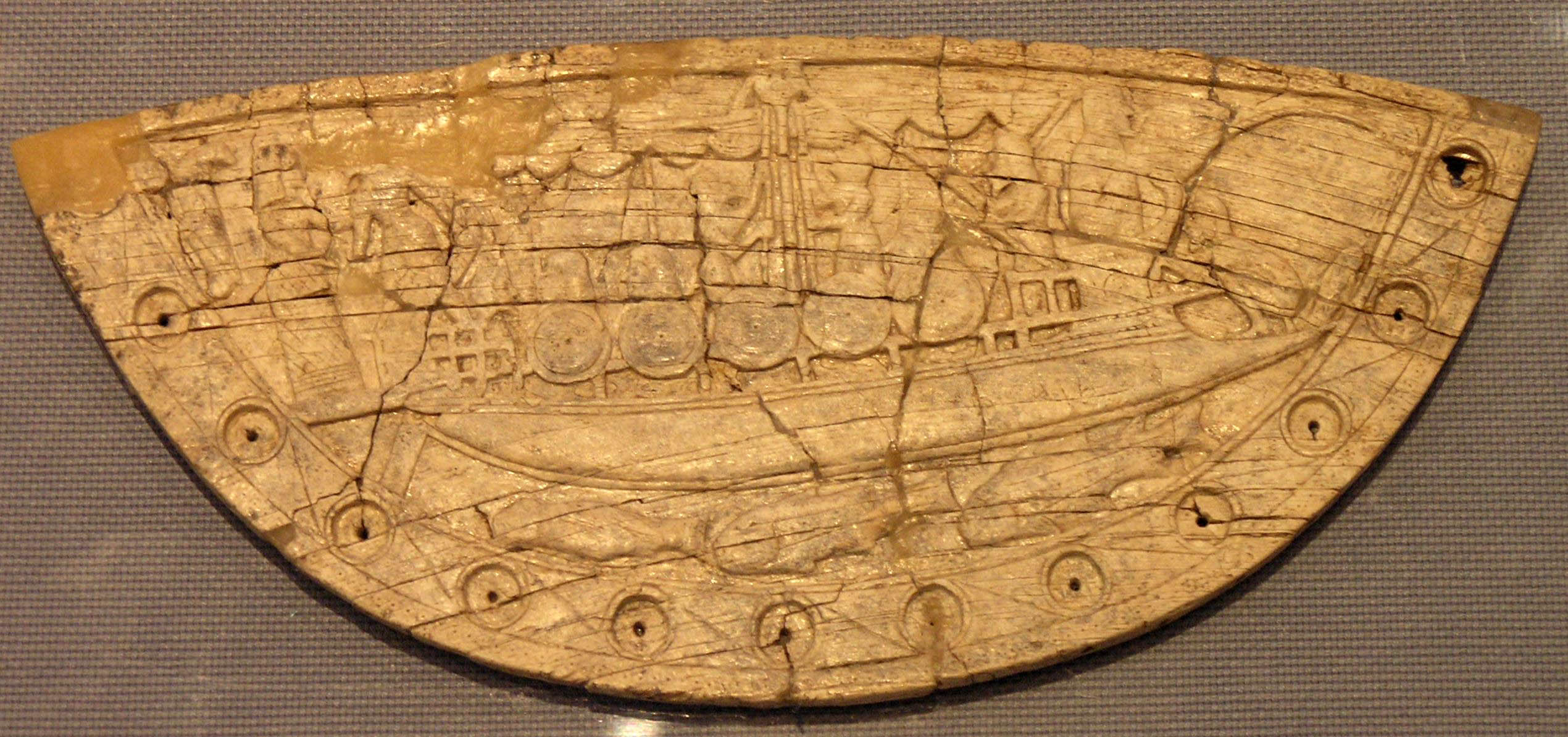
The ivory plaque, National Archaeological Museum, Athens.

A Spartan ivory plaque decorated with a ship was excavated at the sanctuary of Artemis Orthia at Sparta in Greece in 1907, and is now in the National Archaeological Museum, Athens. Its dimensions are 24 cm long, 11 cm wide, with a semi-circular shape. The round outer edge of the plaque is decorated with small circles about 0.8 cm in diameter. Since another one of the hundreds of discovered plaques contained amber inlays, it is believed that these 12 or 13 circles once held similar inlays. The plaque was found associated with Laconian I and II pottery, and dates to the late 8th or early 7th centuries BC.

The ivory plaque shows a relief of a very detailed cataphract ship with a shortened version of the goddess Orthia's name, which indicates that it was probably offered by the captain as a votive offering for a safe voyage. The ship on the plaque, although detailed, is not entirely accurate. Left of the arm of the figure atop the ship's ram are two horizontal lines which represent a wale and extend across the ship's raised bow structure and continue on to become the ship's deck. Had the portrayal of this warship been more accurate, the horizontal lines would have represented a single feature that extended beyond the ship's stem, as opposed to two separate entities that stop at the stem and become a part of the figure's left arm.

== Bibliography ==
- Casson, L. (1991). Ships and Seamanship in the Ancient World. Princeton: Princeton University Press. pp. 50–53.
- Dawkins, R. M. 1906-1907. "Excavations at Sparta, 1907" BSA 13 1-136
- Dawkins, R. M. (1929). The sanctuary of Artemis Orthia at Sparta. pp. 214–215.
- Morrison, J. S.; Williams, R. T. (1996). Greek Oared Ships 900-322 B. C. London: Cambridge University Press. p. 83.
- Pridemore, M. G. (1995). "A re-examination of a ship on an ivory plaque from Sparta". The International Journal of Nautical Archaeology. 24 (2): 161–164.
