= Astrabacus =

Character in Greek mythology

In Greek mythology, Astrabacus (Ancient Greek: Ἀστραβάκου) is a Spartan, the son of Irbus (son of Amphisthenes, son of Amphicles, son of Agis I). He and his brother Alopecus found a wooden image of the goddess Artemis Orthia under a bush of willows; it was surrounded in such a way that it stood upright. Astrabacus had a hero-shrine in Sparta.
