= Amyclae =

Ancient site in Laconia, Greece

Coordinates: 37°02′11″N 22°27′01″E

Map (in Spanish) of ancient southern Peloponnesia; Amyclae is the city titled "Amiclas" just south of Sparta (Esparta).

Amyclae or Amyklai (Ancient Greek: Ἀμύκλαι) was a city of ancient Laconia, situated on the right or western bank of the Eurotas, 20 stadia south of Sparta, in a district remarkable for the abundance of its trees and its fertility. Amyclae was one of the most celebrated cities of Peloponnesus in the Greek Heroic Age. It is said to have been founded by the Lacedaemonian king Amyclas, the father of Hyacinthus, and to have been the abode of Tyndarus, and of Castor and Pollux, who are hence called Amyclaei Fratres. Amyclae is mentioned by Homer, and it continued to maintain its independence as an Achaean town long after the conquest of Peloponnesus by the Dorians.

== Conquest by Sparta ==
According to the common tradition, which represented the conquest of Peloponnesus as effected in one generation by the descendants of Heracles, Amyclae was given by the Dorians to Philonomus, as a reward for his having betrayed to them his native city Sparta. Philonomus is further said to have peopled the town with colonists from Imbros and Lemnos; but there can be no doubt that the ancient Achaean population maintained themselves in the place independent of Sparta for many generations. It was only shortly before the First Messenian War that the town was conquered by the Spartan king Teleclus. The tale ran, that the inhabitants of Amyclae had been so often alarmed by false reports of the approach of the enemy, that they passed a law that no one should mention the subject; and accordingly, when the Spartans at last came, and no one dared to announce their approach, "Amyclae perished through silence:" hence arose the proverb Amyclis ipsis taciturnior ("quieter than Amyclae itself").

== Temple of Apollo ==
After its capture by the Lacedaemonians Amyclae became a village, and was only memorable by the festival of the Hyacinthia celebrated at the place annually, and by the temple and colossal statue of Apollo, who was hence called Amyclaeus. The throne on which this statue was placed was a celebrated work of art, and was constructed by Bathycles of Magnesia. It was crowned by a great number of bas-reliefs, of which an account is given by Pausanias. Bathycles of Magnesia also dedicated a statue of Artemis Leucophryne at Amyclae.

== Location ==
Amyclae is located approximately 2 kilometres (1.2 mi) northeast of the modern village of Amykles, named after the ancient city. Whilst excavating the site, William Martin Leake discovered an imperfect inscription, the letters ΑΜΥ following a proper name, and leaving little doubt that the incomplete word was ΑΜΥΚΛΑΙΟΥ.

== Bibliography ==
- Βλίζος, Σταύρος (2021). "Ανασκαφή στο ιερό του Απολλωνος Αμυκλαιου". Πρακτικά Αρχαιολογικής Εταιρείας. 176: 65–74.
