= List of Byzantine Greek words of Latin origin =

This is a list of loanwords of Latin origin which entered the Greek language during the Byzantine era.

- Augousta, honorific term for the Empress
- Chartoularios tou kanikleiou, one of the most senior offices in the Byzantine imperial chancery
- Domestikos, a civil, ecclesiastic and military office
- Doukas, the name of a Byzantine noble family, from the Latin title dux
- Doux, a high ranking military office, from the Latin title dux
- Droungarios, a military rank
- Indiktion, taxation cycle, from Latin indictio
- Magistros, a ministerial title
- Magnaura, a large building in Constantinople, possibly from Latin Magna Aula, "Great Hall"
- Kaisar, an imperial court title from the Latin cognomen Caesar
- Kensor, judicial office, from the Roman republican office of censor
- Koiaistor, judicial office, from the Roman republican office of quaestor
- Kouropalates, a court title
- Optimatoi, a military unit
- Patrikios, the Patrician caste, from the Latin patricius
- Phelonion, a liturgical vestment
- Praipositos, a senior palace title
- Praitor, judicial official, from the Roman republican office of praetor
- Primikerios, a title applied to heads of departments and colleges
- Protonotarios, head of the colleges of the notarioi
- Rousioi, the "Reds", team in chariot racing
- Sakellarios, an official with administrative and financial duties
- Silentiarios, a class of courtiers
- Tourma, administrative sub-division of a thema
- Varvatos, term meaning "bearded"
- Venetoi, the "Blues", team in chariot racing
- Vestiarion, a major fiscal department
