= Bathycles of Magnesia =

Bathycles of Magnesia (Greek: Βαθυκλής) was an Ionian sculptor of Magnesia on the Maeander. He was commissioned by the Spartans to make a marble throne for the statue of Apollo at Amyclae, about 550 BC. Pausanias gives us a detailed description of this monument, which is of the greatest value to us, showing the character of Ionic art at the time. It was adorned with scenes from mythology in relief and supporting figures in the round. Adolf Furtwängler, on p. 706 of Meisterwerke der griechischen Plastik (1893), gives a reconstruction of the work.
