= Hyacinthia =

Ancient Spartan religious festival

The death of Hyacinthus was celebrated at Amyclae by the second most important of Spartan festivals, the Hyacinthia (Ancient Greek Ὑακίνθια / Hyakínthia) in the Spartan month Hyacinthius in early summer.

== Proceedings of Hyacinthia ==
The Hyacinthia lasted three days. Their details have been passed down to us through the descriptions in Athenaeus and Didymus. The first day was given over to mourning for the death of the hero: sacrifices were offered to the dead, banquets were stark and without pomp or decoration, and the sacrificial breads were very plain.

The second day was one of celebration for his rebirth. The young people played the cithara and the aulos, and sang of the glory of Apollo. Others participated in horse races. Numerous choirs competed in town, singing country songs and dancing. Amyclae was also the location of parades of carts decorated by the girls and women of Sparta. Numerous sacrifices were offered, exclusively goats, with the occasion of the κοπίς, kopis, banquets where the citizens invited their friends and relatives. The helots had the right to participate in the celebrations, as did any foreigners: "They treat not only their countrymen, but any foreigners who happen by" (Athenaeus, IV, 138F). The kopis took place under special tents known as σκηναί (skēnaí), a characteristic trait of ancient country festivals.

The third day is not described in detail, it is possible that it was more solemn, or that mysteries were held. It is also known that for this holiday, the Spartan women wove a chiton (χιτών / chitōn, or "tunic") which is then offered to the god—a tradition similar to the peplos offered to Athena at Athens upon the occasion of the Panathenaic Games.

The Hyacinthia was a major Spartan holiday. Xenophon, in the Hellenics IV, 5, 11, reports that the Spartans interrupted their campaigns in order to be able to return to Laconia so as to participate. Pausanias writes that they even negotiated a truce especially for this purpose. According to Thucydides, upon the peace of Nicias, Athens, in order to prove its good will towards Sparta, promised to assist at the celebrations.

== See also ==
- Carneia
- Gymnopaediae

== Bibliography ==
- (in French) Louis Gernet, « Frairies antiques », Anthropologie de la Grèce antique, Flammarion, coll. « Champs », 1999 (ISBN 2-08-081105-3);
- (in French) Edmond Lévy, Sparte : histoire politique et sociale jusqu’à la conquête romaine, Seuil, coll. « Points Histoire », Paris, 2003 (ISBN 2-02-032453-9);
- Michael Pettersson, Cults of Apollo at Sparta: The Hyakinthia, the Gymnopaidiai, and the Karneia, Paul Åströms Forlag, Stockholm, 1992 (ISBN 91-7916-027-1);
- William Wayte et G.E. Marindin, A Dictionary of Greek and Roman Antiquities, éditions William Smith, 1890.
