= Gymnopaedia =

Festival in Ancient Greece

The Gymnopaedia was an annual festival celebrated exclusively in ancient Sparta, which helped to define Spartan identity. It featured generations of naked Spartan men participating in war dancing and choral singing, with a large emphasis placed on age and generational groups. It is believed that celebration of this festival began in 668 BCE to honour a Spartan victory in Thyrea. The festival likely evolved over time to celebrate other Spartan victories such as that over the Argives in the Battle of the Champions. The Gymnopaedia was primarily in honour of Apollo, but also celebrated Artemis and Leto, who served as representations of the childhood which would soon be left behind by the young participants. Though the festival was ritualistic, it should not necessarily be interpreted as religious. Pausanias describes the Gymnopaedia as "a festival which the Lacedaemonians take more seriously than any other" (Paus. 3.11.9).

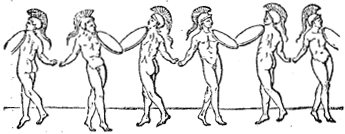
Corybantian dance, the type of dance most likely danced on Gymnopedia festivals (image from Smith's Dictionary of Antiquities).

== Etymology ==
The word Gymnopaedia derives from the ancient Greek Γυμνοπαιδίαι, composed of the words γυμνός (gymnos, "naked" or "unarmed") and παιδιά "paedia" from παῖς (pais, "child" or "youth").

== Setting ==
=== Time and date ===
The Gymnopaedia took place each year in approximately July. July was the first month of the year for the Spartans as their calendar revolved around the summer solstice. The festival was the first public gathering of the new year for the Spartans. The Gymnopaedia celebrated Apollo, a fitting tribute as he was also the god of civic reunions such as gatherings, and this was the first large gathering of the year. There are conflicting accounts of how many days the Gymnopaedia lasted for, but it is accepted to have been at least three days. The Spartans would have partaken in the festival from dusk until dawn each of these days. The festival came to an end during the full moon which fell closest to the heliacal rising of the star Sirius being visible in Sparta. The festival took place at the hottest time of the year in Sparta, which meant most of the activities happened under very harsh sun.

=== Location ===
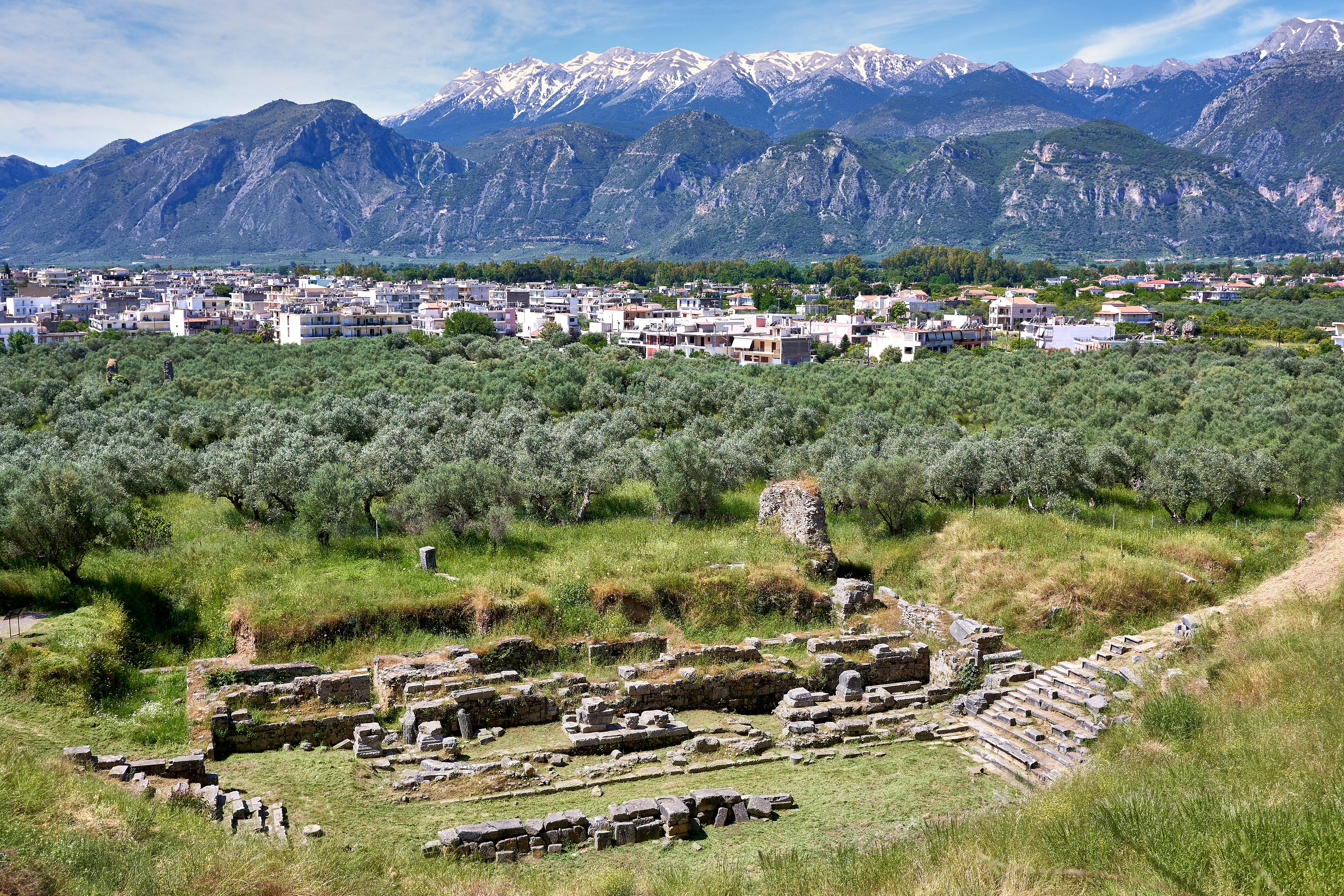
A theatre constructed in Ancient Sparta during the late Hellenistic / Early Roman period. Though the Gymnopaedia would have been celebrated for hundreds of years before this theatre, it has the same sloped view the Spartans likely used.

The festival lasted for several days and took place in multiple areas, as different sources describe different locations for the activities of the Gymnopaedia. Pausanias writes of an area of the Spartan agora known as the choros or "dancing ground" because of the significant role it played in the Gymnopaedia. The choros was likely located in the east of the agora where the chorus dances were known to have been performed. Pausanias states that near this area there were statues of Apollo Pythaeus, Artemis, and Leto (Paus 3.11.9). Herodotus (Hdt. 6.67.3), Xenophon (Xen. Hell. 6.4.16), and Plutarch (Plut. Ages. 29.2), each make note of crowds gathering in a "theatre" or "viewing place" for festivals in Sparta; this was likely a place where the public would gather on a slope to view performances on level ground below. Due to how little remains of structures or landmarks in Ancient Sparta we cannot be certain the exact location of the agora or potential "theatres".

== Celebrations ==
The major element of celebration during the Gymnopaedia was the songs and dances performed by choruses of naked men as a form of competition. The main focus of the festival was the young men who were about to enter adulthood. Because the contests were more symbolic than strictly athletic in nature, they may be interpreted as a ceremonial and initiatory part of the agoge.

Because all of Sparta would gather to partake in or view the events of the Gymnopaedia, it helped to develop a communal identity and sense of being a part of a single group.

=== Choral song and dance ===
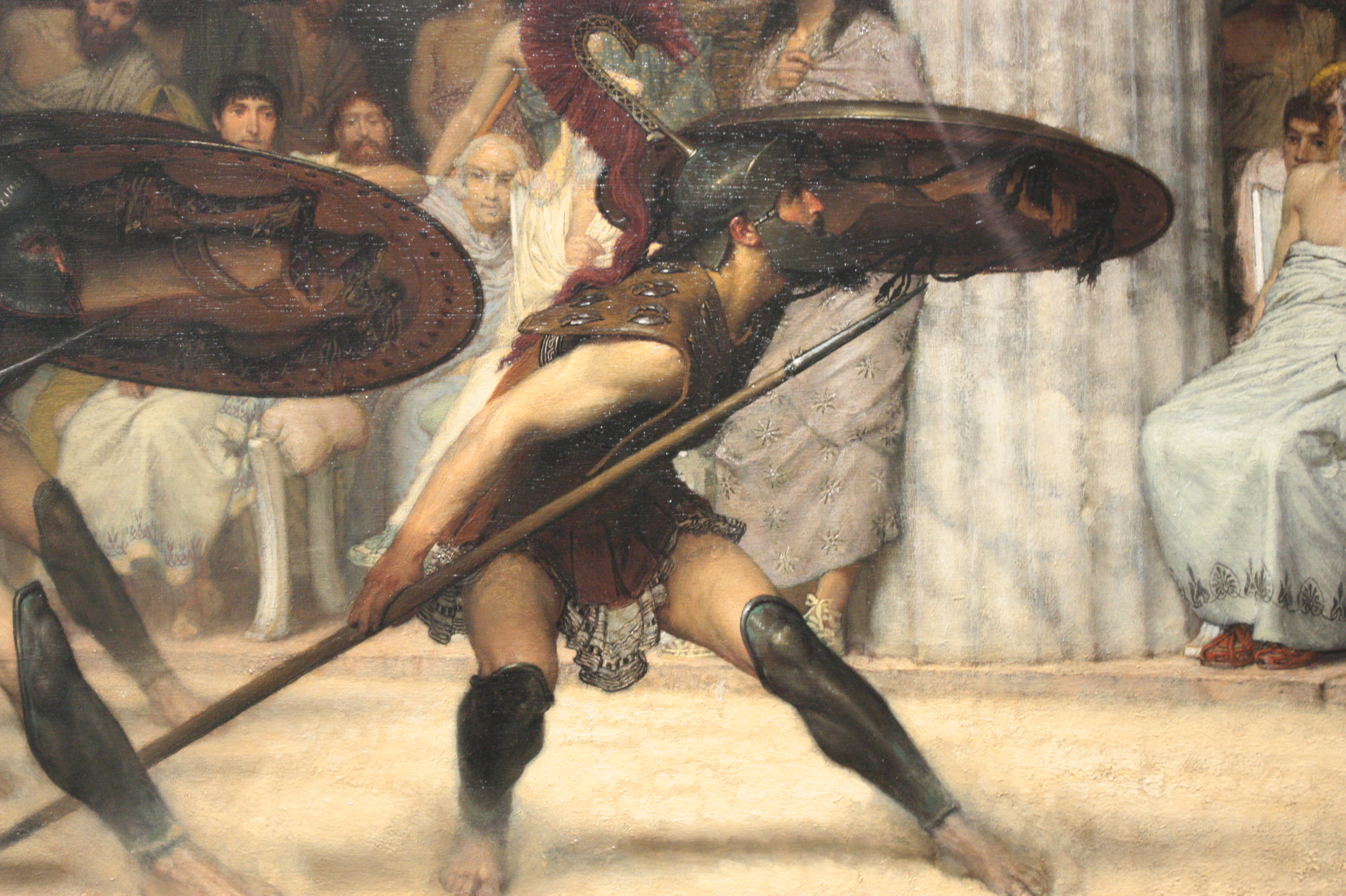
An artistic interpretation of Pyrrhic dance by Lawrence Tadema. Pryrrhic dance is similar to what the Spartans may have performed during the Gymnopaedia.

The choral groups would dance naked. The songs the young men sang drew attention to the physical maturity they were reaching. Physical ability was an important aspect of becoming a citizen in many Ancient Greek poleis, but Sparta was the only polis which celebrated this so prominently. These celebratory dances took place in a specified area in the agora.

The practices of song and dance were not reserved for only the young men. In a different area of the city three groups of choruses would gather to perform traditional songs together. They would honour Apollo through songs and performed songs which represented the phases of life. The songs would have been written by famous Spartan poets. Though there were no shows of strength or arms taken up at the festival, the songs still had a militaristic quality. By performing songs with this quality the Spartans could connect the festival to their military exploits. They sang songs described as having a "boastful" tone, which were written in iambic trimeter. The same songs would be used each year.

The choruses were divided into three groups, one for young men or boys coming to maturity, one for men in their prime, and one for old men. There is little surviving evidence of what songs and dance would be performed, but Plutarch writes that at least one element of the performance would involve the old men singing: "We once did deeds of prowess and were strong young men", to which the men in their prime would sing: "We are so now, and if you wish, behold and see", followed by the boys singing: "We shall be sometime mightier men by far than both' (Plut. Lyc. 21.2). The three groups competing and interacting with each other helped to place an emphasis on Spartans as a collective, rather than as individual competitors. Scholars consider the actions of the Gymnopaedia to be both a crucial part of Spartan education and a test of endurance for the children coming of age. It was considered as such because of the extremely hot conditions and precisely performed dance moves.

This aspect of the festival was such a spectacle that non-Spartans would visit Sparta during the Gymnopaedia just to see it.

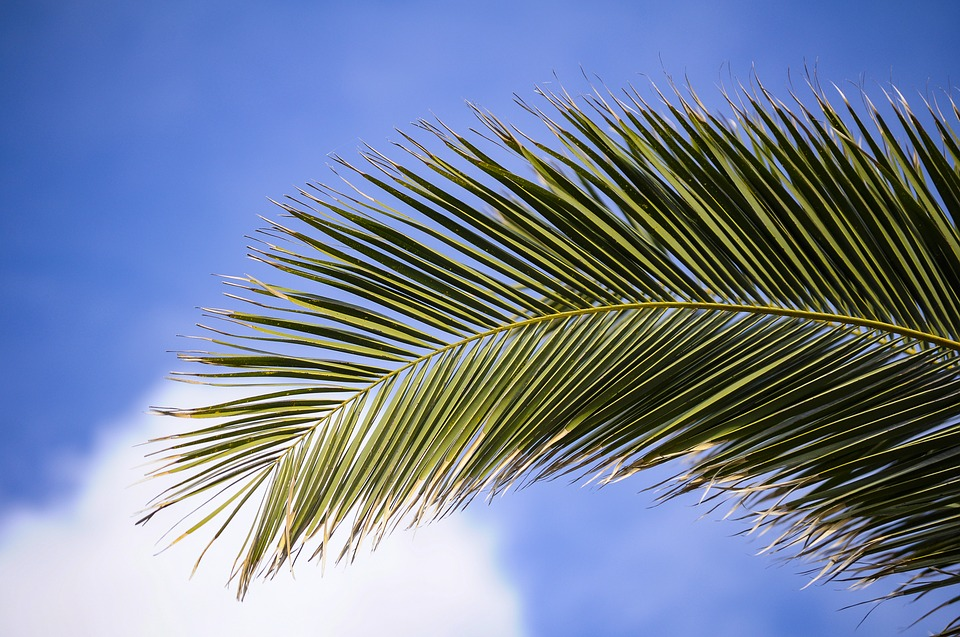
Palm leaves such as this would have been used to construct the thyreatic crowns for the festival.

=== Special garments ===
The leaders of each chorus group would wear a headpiece known as the "feather crown" or "thyreatic crown". These crowns were made out of palm leaves and were referred to as "feather crowns" due to the leaves' resemblance to feathers. The Spartans also used these crowns at other festivals.

== Historical relevance ==
=== Ancient Sparta ===
King Leotychides used the gathering of the Gymnopaedia to deliver an insult to the recently deposed king Demaratus, asking him via messenger what it felt like to hold public office after being a king. He responded calmly that he had experience in both unlike Leotychides himself, also saying that this question would be the beginning of either great fortune or great evil for Sparta. He then left the festival and made a sacrifice to Zeus. (Hdt. 6.67).

The Gymnopaedia was important enough to the Spartans that they would avoid leaving the city even if called on. Thucydides explains an occasion of this in History of the Peloponnesian War (Thuc. 5.82). The Argive democrats knew how important the festival was to the Spartans, and waited until the festival began in order to attack the ruling oligarchs who were allied with Sparta. The Spartans eventually postponed the Gymnopaedia, but the oligarchs had already been defeated by this time.

The festival was of such importance to the Spartans that even king Agesilaus participated despite his lameness, but was hidden in the back of the group so no one could see his physical flaws. Xenophon writes that Agesilaus was extremely devoted to religion (Xen. Ages. 3.2), so he would have seen this participation as a duty.

The news of Spartan loss at the battle of Leuctra reached Sparta during the final day of the Gymnopaedia. Despite the large negative effect this news would have on Sparta's power, the ephors would not allow any dances to be cancelled or for the celebrations to be changed. When the families of the deceased soldiers had been told of the news, the ephors brought the festival to a close (Plut. Ages. 29. 2-3). Xenophon expands on this information, saying that the ephors instructed the families of the dead to suffer their grief in silence so as not to disrupt the festival. The following day all those who had lost relatives could be seen smiling and being cheerful in public. Those who had family members at the battle who were still living were sad and worried for their loved ones (Xen. Hell. 6.4).

Plutarch says Lichas, a wealthy Spartan, gained fame for entertaining many of the strangers at a "boys gymnastic festival" (Plut. Cim. 10, 5) This festival was interpreted by Xenophon to be the Gymnopaedia.

=== Ancient Greece ===
Plutarch mentions that the city was "full of strangers" during the Gymnopaidia suggesting that non-Spartans and potentially perioikoi would also attend the festival. (Plut. Ages. 29.2).

Plato seems to have made a reference praising the effects of the songs and rituals of the gymnopaedia in his work Laws (Plat. Laws 633c).

== See also ==
- For the pyrrhic dance, a war dance spread throughout ancient Greece, see Korybantes
- Gymnopédie - 19th century music and poetry referring to gymnopaedia; particularly the three piano compositions by the French composer Erik Satie.
- Hyacinthia - Another Ancient Spartan festival
- Spartan pederasty
- Carneia - Another ancient Spartan festival
- Laconophilia - An affinity for Spartan history and culture
- Agora - Main public spaces in ancient Greece
- Agesilaus II - A King of Sparta
- Apollo - Greek God and one of the 12 Olympian Gods
- Leto - Mythological mother of Apollo and Artemis
- Artemis - Greek Goddess and one of the 12 Olympian Gods
